= National symbols of Romania =

There are several national symbols of Romania, representing Romania or its people in either official or unofficial capacities.

== Official symbols of Romania ==
Type	Image	Symbol
National flag		The Flag of Romania (Romanian: Drapelul României) is a tricolour with vertical stripes: beginning from the flagpole, blue, yellow and red. During the Wallachian uprising of 1821 these colours composed the revolutionaries' flag and for the first time a recorded meaning was attributed to them: "Liberty (sky-blue), Justice (field yellow), Fraternity (blood red)". The tricolor was first adopted in Wallachia in 1834. The vertical placement of the colours was adopted in 1868.
National coat of arms		The Coat of arms of Romania; The golden eagle holding an Orthodox cross is the symbol for the founding House of Basarab, the core around which was formed in Wallachia, one of the three Romanian provinces of the Middle Ages. The shield on which it is placed is azure, symbolizing the sky. The eagle holds in its talons the insignia of sovereignty: a scepter and a sword, the latter reminding of Moldavia's ruler, Stephen the Great whereas the mace reminds of Michael the Brave, the first unifier of the Romanian Principalities; and surmounted by the Steel Crown of Romania. On the bird's chest there is a quartered escutcheon with the symbols of the historical Romanian provinces (Wallachia, Moldavia, Transylvania, Banat and Oltenia but also Dobruja).
National anthem	Awaken thee, Romanian!	Deșteaptă-te, române! It was written and published during the 1848 revolution and was first sung in late June in the same year in the city of Brașov, being immediately accepted as the revolutionary anthem. Since then, this song, which contains a message of liberty and patriotism, has been sung during all major Romanian conflicts, including during the 1989 anti-Ceauşist revolution. In 1990 it became the national anthem, replacing the communist-era national anthem "Trei culori" ("Three colours"). The Moldavian Democratic Republic, during its brief existence, between 1917 and 1918 as well as the Republic of Moldova between 1991 and 1994 had the same anthem. July 29 is the "National Anthem Day" (Ziua Imnului național), an annual observance in Romania.
Great Union Day		Great Union Day; It commemorates the assembly of the delegates of the people of Transilvania held in Alba Iulia, which declared the union of Transylvania with Romania and completed the Great Union. This holiday was set after the 1989 Romanian Revolution and it marks the unification of Transylvania, but also of the provinces of Bessarabia and Bukovina with the Romanian Kingdom, in 1918. Before 1918, the national holiday of Romania was set to be on May 10, which had a double meaning: it was the day on which Carol I of Romania set foot on the Romanian soil (in 1866), and it was the day on which the prince ratified the Declaration of Independence from the Ottoman Empire in 1877. In Communist Romania, the date of the national holiday was set to 23 August to mark the 1944 overthrow of the pro-fascist government of Marshal Ion Antonescu.
Independence Day		Independence Day; It commemorates the day of 9/21 May 1877, Mihail Kogălniceanu, through a memorable speech, proclaimed Romania's independence in the cheers of the Assembly. In the same afternoon, the Senate voted on the motion, and after that, a procession with chariots and torches was formed throughout Bucharest. The next day, 10/22 May, it was 11 years since Prince Carol had arrived in Bucharest to receive the throne of the Principalities and a great festivity was already announced. The first to speak was the vice-president of the Chamber, Dimitrie Brătianu: "Your Majesty, the Chamber and the Senate have recognized Romania's independence" against Turkey. Your Majesty, in the heroic heads of our armies, will make the enemy impose itself and be recognized by the guarantor powers as a salutary necessity in Europe." Thus, 10 May became the National Day of Romania during the regal period. In 2015, it was declared a national holiday signifying the start of King Carol's reign in 1866, the state's independence, and the crowning of the first king.
Official language		Romanian; The main Eastern Romance language, spoken by around 24 to 28 million people
Military flag		The Military Colours of Romania; The military colours are the symbol of the military units. The flag is based on the national flag of Romania, with the coat of arms of Romania in the center and the symbols of the Force categories in the corners. Following the Roman military traditions, an aquila is placed on top of the pole. The aquila is similar to the one featured on the coat of arms, and sits on top of a rectangular sign with the text "Onoare și Patrie" ("Honour and Fatherland" – the military motto used since the reign of Alexandru Ioan Cuza) in front, and the unit name on the back. The flagpole also features a brass ring with the name of the unit.
National patron saint		Saint Andrew; According to the Romanian Orthodox Church, Andrew preached the Gospel in Scythia, which included the province of Dobruja (Scythia Minor). The legend says that Saint Andrew arrived in Dobruja during a harsh winter and took refuge in a cave. In the cave, Saint Andrew hit the ground with his walking stick and a spring appeared, where he baptized the locals and cured the ill. Saint Andrew was named patron saint of Dobruja in 1994, and patron saint of Romania in 1997, with 30 November becoming a national holiday in 2012.
Floral emblem		Romanian Peony; Official national flower since 2022. The Romanian Peony (Bujorul românesc in Romanian) day is celebrated on 15 May.
National sport		Oină; Declared as the national sport on 14 July 2014.

== Unofficial symbols ==
Type	Image	Symbol
National crown		The Steel Crown of Romania; The crown was forged from the steel of a gun captured by the Romanian Army from the Ottomans during the War of Independence (1877–1878). King Carol I of Romania chose steel, and not gold, to symbolize the bravery of the Romanian soldiers and was crowned with it during the ceremonies of the proclamation of Romania as a kingdom in 1881 in Bucharest. The Crown was again used in 1922 at the coronation of King Ferdinand I of Romania and Queen Maria of Romania as sovereigns at Alba-Iulia. The third time the Crown was used during the coronation and anointment of King Michael I of Romania by the Orthodox Patriarch of Romania, Nicodim Munteanu, in the Patriarchal Cathedral of Bucharest, on the very day of his second accession, 6 September 1940. The Steel Crown is kept in the National Museum of Romanian History
National personification		Romania
National motto		"Nihil sine Deo" (Latin, "Nothing without God"); Used under the Hohenzollern-Sigmaringen dynasty
National motto		"Toți în unu" (Romanian, "All in one"); Used during the second half of the reign of Alexandru Ioan Cuza
National motto		"Dreptate, Frăție" (Romanian, "Justice, Brotherhood"); Used in Wallachia after the Wallachian Revolution of 1848
National motto		"In Fide Salus" (Latin, "In Faith is the Salvation"); Used as the motto of the Order of the Star of Romania since 10 May 1877
National motto		"Onoare și Patrie" (Romanian, "Honour and Fatherland"); Used as the motto of the Romanian Army since the reign of Alexandru Ioan Cuza
National founder		Alexandru Ioan Cuza; Cuza is known as the founder of the first Romanian state, unifing the Romanians of Wallachia and Moldavia as the first prince regnant (or Domnitor) of United Principalities of Moldavia and Wallachia. He is considered a national hero and the national founder of modern Romania.
National mythical animal		Balaur
National bird		Golden eagle (featured on the national coat of arms)
National bird		Great white pelican (as a symbol for the Danube Delta)
National animal		Eurasian lynx
National tree		Oak
National poet		Mihai Eminescu
National epic		Miorița
National wear		Romanian traditional clothing
National hat		Clop
National hat		Cușmă
National motif		The Endless Column; Depicting an important motif in the traditional art. The pattern stands for infinity and persistence.
National Guard Brigade		Brigada 30 Gardă "Mihai Viteazul"
National mountain		Moldoveanu Peak; 2544 m – highest mountain peak of Romania
National dance		Hora
National dance		Căluș (included on the UNESCO Intangible Cultural Heritage List)
National instrument		Nai
National instrument		Bucium
National beverage		Țuică
National dish		Sarmale
National dish		Mămăligă
National dish		Mititei
National sweet		Papanași
National sweet		Cozonac
