= Armistice Day =

Commemorating the end of WWI

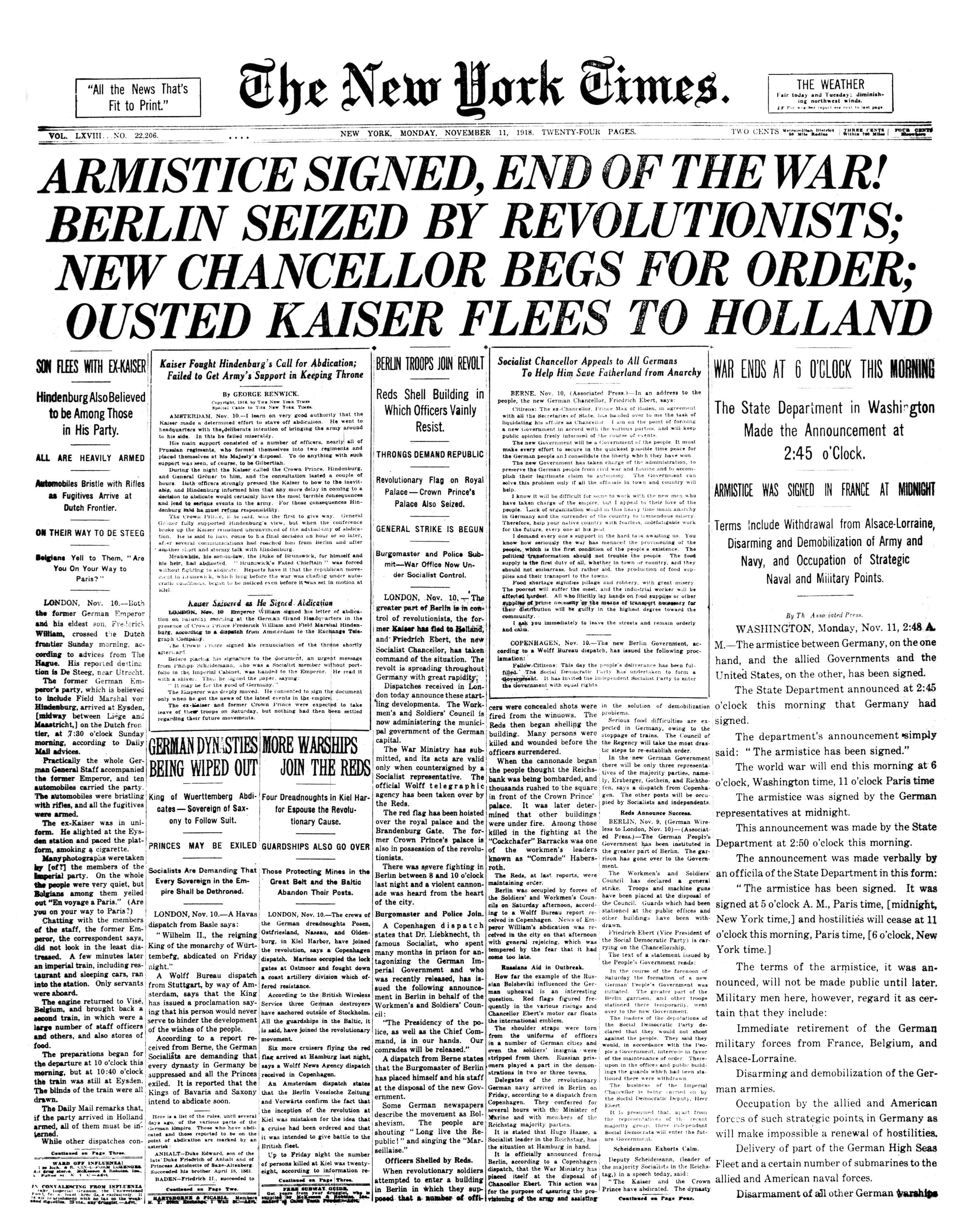
- Front page of The New York Times on Armistice Day, 11 November 1918
- Observed by: Australia, Belgium, Canada, France, New Zealand, Romania, Serbia, United Kingdom and many other countries
- Significance: Commemoration of the signing of the Armistice at Compiègne, France between the Allied Powers and Germany effectively ending all military operations and hostilities on the Western front of World War I
- Date: 11 November
- Next time: 11 November 2027
- Frequency: Annual
- First time: World's first official observance at Buckingham Palace, London, on 11 November 1919
- Related to: Remembrance Sunday, Remembrance Day (Commonwealth), National Independence Day (Poland), National Unity and Armed Forces Day (Italy), Veterans Day (United States);

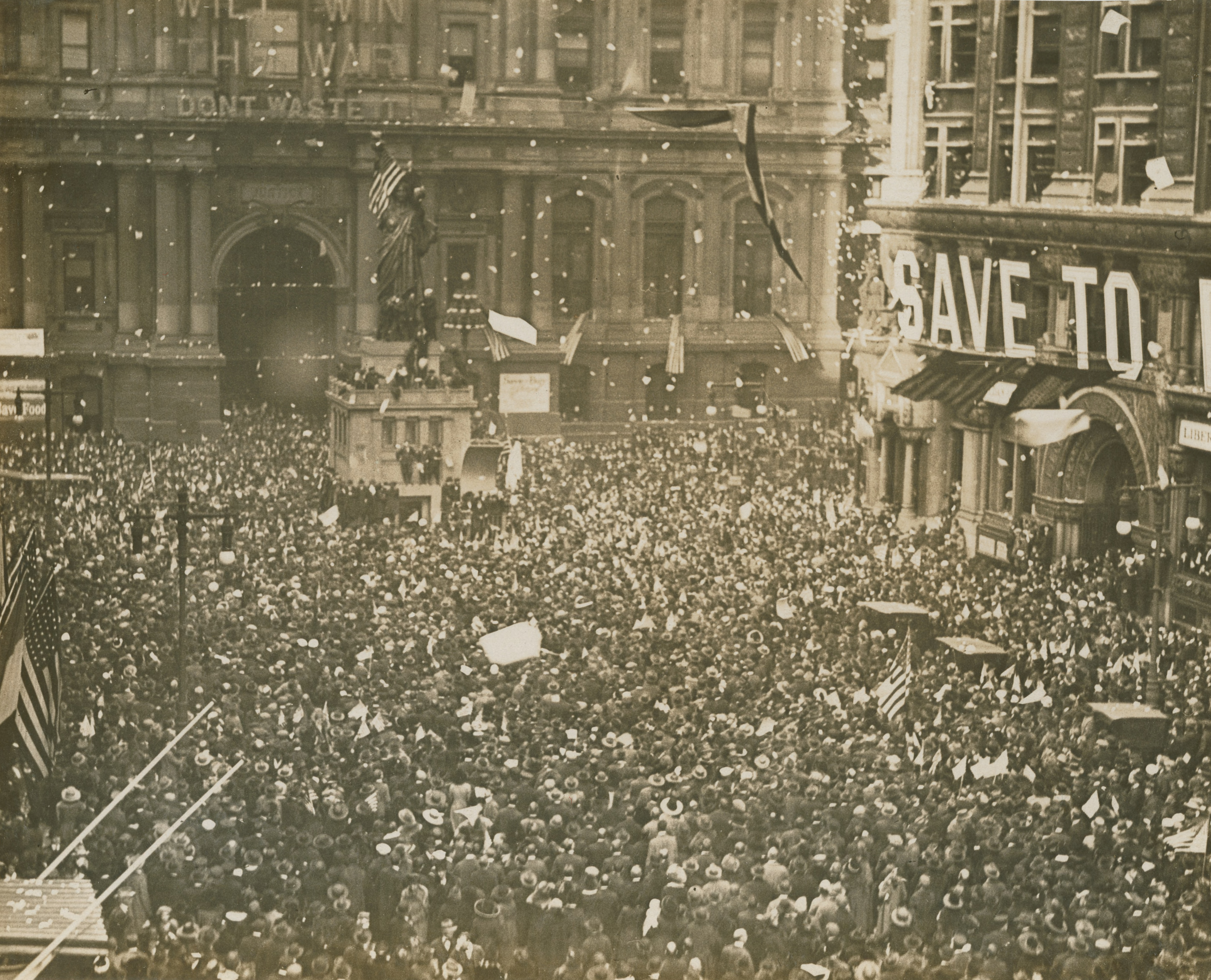
Armistice Day celebrations in Philadelphia, Pennsylvania on 11 November 1918

Armistice Day, later known as Remembrance Day in the Commonwealth and Veterans Day in the United States, is commemorated every year on 11 November to mark the armistice signed between the Allies of World War I and Germany at Compiègne, France, at 5:45 am for the cessation of hostilities on the Western Front of World War I, which took effect at 11:00 am—the "eleventh hour of the eleventh day of the eleventh month" of 1918—although, according to Thomas R. Gowenlock, an intelligence officer with the U.S. First Division, shelling from both sides continued for the rest of the day, ending only at nightfall. The armistice initially expired after a period of 36 days and had to be extended several times. A formal peace agreement was reached only when the Treaty of Versailles was signed the following year.

The date is a national holiday in France, and it was declared a national holiday in many Allies of World War I nations, several of which have since changed the name of the holiday from Armistice Day to either Remembrance Day in the Commonwealth of Nations, or Veterans Day in the United States. Italy celebrates the Armistice with Austria on November 4 as National Unity and Armed Forces Day. In Poland, November 11 coincides with National Independence Day.

== History in Allied countries ==
The first Armistice Day celebration was held at Buckingham Palace, commencing with King George V hosting a "Banquet in Honour of the President of the French Republic" (Raymond Poincaré) in the evening hours of 10 November 1919. The first official Armistice Day events were subsequently held in the grounds of Buckingham Palace on the morning of 11 November 1919, which included a two-minute silence as a mark of respect for those who died in the war and those left behind.

Similar ceremonies developed in other countries during the inter-war period. In South Africa, for example, the Memorable Order of Tin Hats had by the late 1920s developed a ceremony whereby the toast of "Fallen Comrades" was observed not only in silence but darkness, all except for the "Light of Remembrance", with the ceremony ending with the Order's anthem "Old Soldiers Never Die". (Note: Some sources report (all in identical words) that the South Australian State Branch of the Returned Sailors & Soldiers' Imperial League of Australia developed a simple ceremony of silence for departed comrades at 9 p.m., but there is no reliable source confirming that this happened on Armistice Day. The Club Palm Beach (formerly Palm Beach RSL) reports that a silence was observed in Adelaide in 1916 to mark the landing at Gallipoli.)

In the UK, beginning in 1939, the two-minute silence was moved to the Sunday nearest to 11 November in order not to interfere with wartime production should 11 November fall on a weekday. This became Remembrance Sunday.

Commemorations of November 11 were initially focused on honoring the military dead of the First World War and the return to peace. Just prior to or after World War II, many countries changed the name of the holiday, several changed the focus to include all veterans of their armed services, and a few honor their war dead both uniformed and civilian. Most member states of the Commonwealth of Nations followed the earlier example of Canada and adopted the name Remembrance Day. The United States in 1954 changed the name to All Veterans Day, later shortened to 'Veterans Day'.

== 21st century ==
In the United Kingdom, Armistice Day is observed with a two minute silence on the eleventh hour, with the main service taking place on Remembrance Sunday (also known as Remembrance Day). Both days are commemorated formally but are not public holidays. The National Service of Remembrance is held in London on Remembrance Sunday. The Catholic Bishops of England and Wales suggested that churches should conduct a Requiem Mass for the dead of the war on Sunday 11 November 2018.

In the United States, Veterans Day honors American veterans, both living and deceased. The official day of national remembrance of those killed in action is Memorial Day, which predates World War I. Some, including American novelist Kurt Vonnegut and American Veteran For Peace Rory Fanning, have urged Americans to resume observation of 11 November as Armistice Day, a day to reflect on how we can achieve peace as it was originally observed.

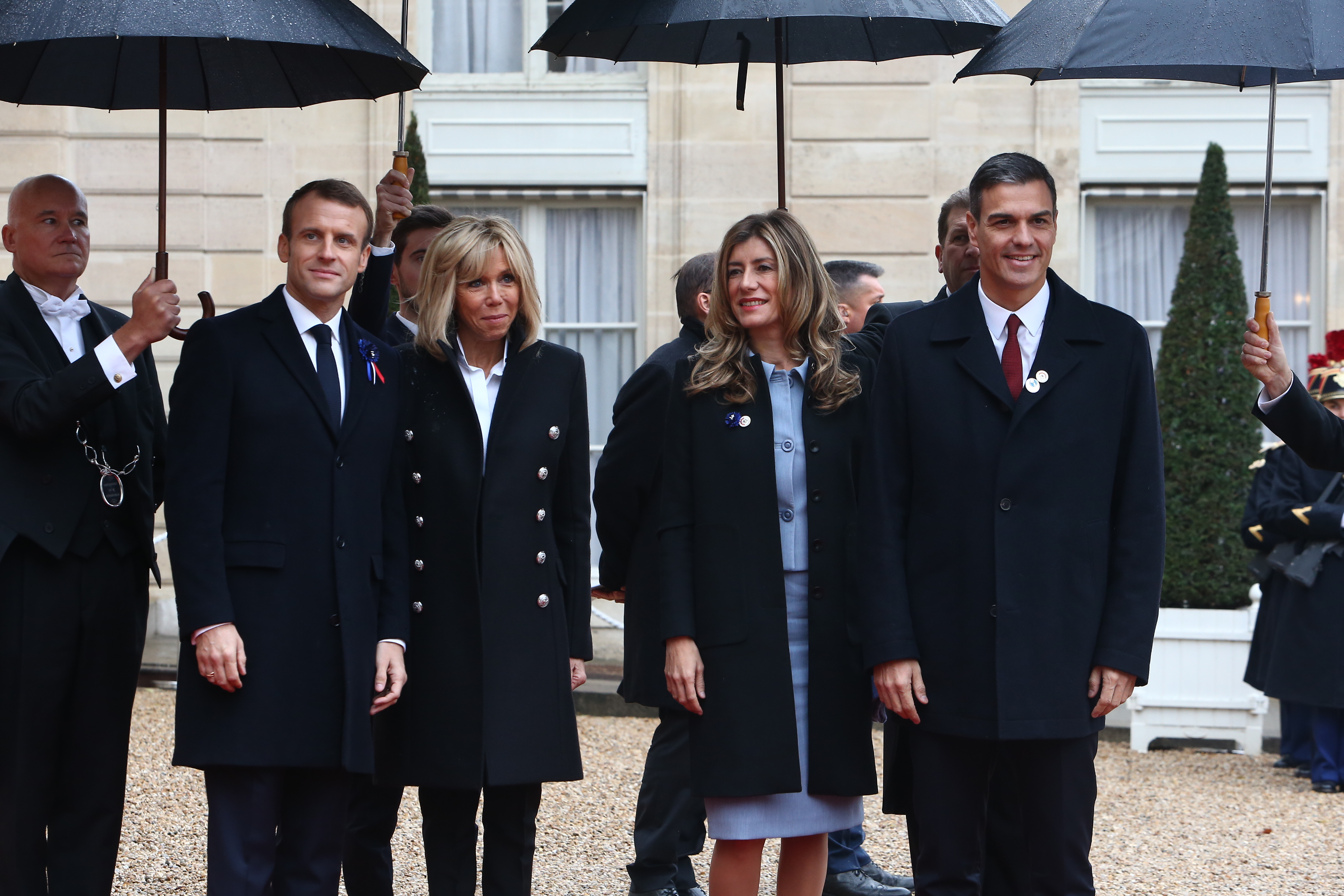
Presidential couple of France and Prime Ministerial couple of Spain in the centenary commemoration of the Armistice, 11 November 2018

In France, the holiday may also be known as Remembrance Day (Jour du Souvenir). In Belgium, it remains Armistice Day (Jour de l'Armistice).

The day has been a public holiday in Serbia since 2012. The Serbian forces suffered the largest casualty rate in World War I. To commemorate their victims, people in Serbia wear Natalie's ramonda as a symbol of remembrance.

In Poland, 11 November is observed as National Independence Day, a public holiday to commemorate the anniversary of the restoration of Poland's sovereignty as the Second Polish Republic in 1918, after 123 years of partition by the Russian Empire, the Kingdom of Prussia and the Habsburg Empire.

In Romania, Armistice Day is observed as Veterans' Day or Combat Theater Veterans Day, the day also signifies the death of the first Romanian soldier in the Afghanistan war on 11 November 2003. Since 2015, the Romanian peony is used to pay tribute to the Romanian soldiers who died on the battlefield.

Ceremonies are held in Kenya over the weekend two weeks after Armistice Day. This is because news of the armistice only reached today's Zambia (the then Northern Rhodesia) about a fortnight later, where the German and British commanders then had to agree on the protocols for their own armistice ceremony.

On 11 November 2018, the centenary of the Armistice, commemorations were held globally. In France, more than 60 heads of state and government gathered at the Arc de Triomphe in Paris.

== See also ==
- Timeline of World War I
