= Andrew the Apostle =

Apostle of Jesus

Saint Andrew the Apostle
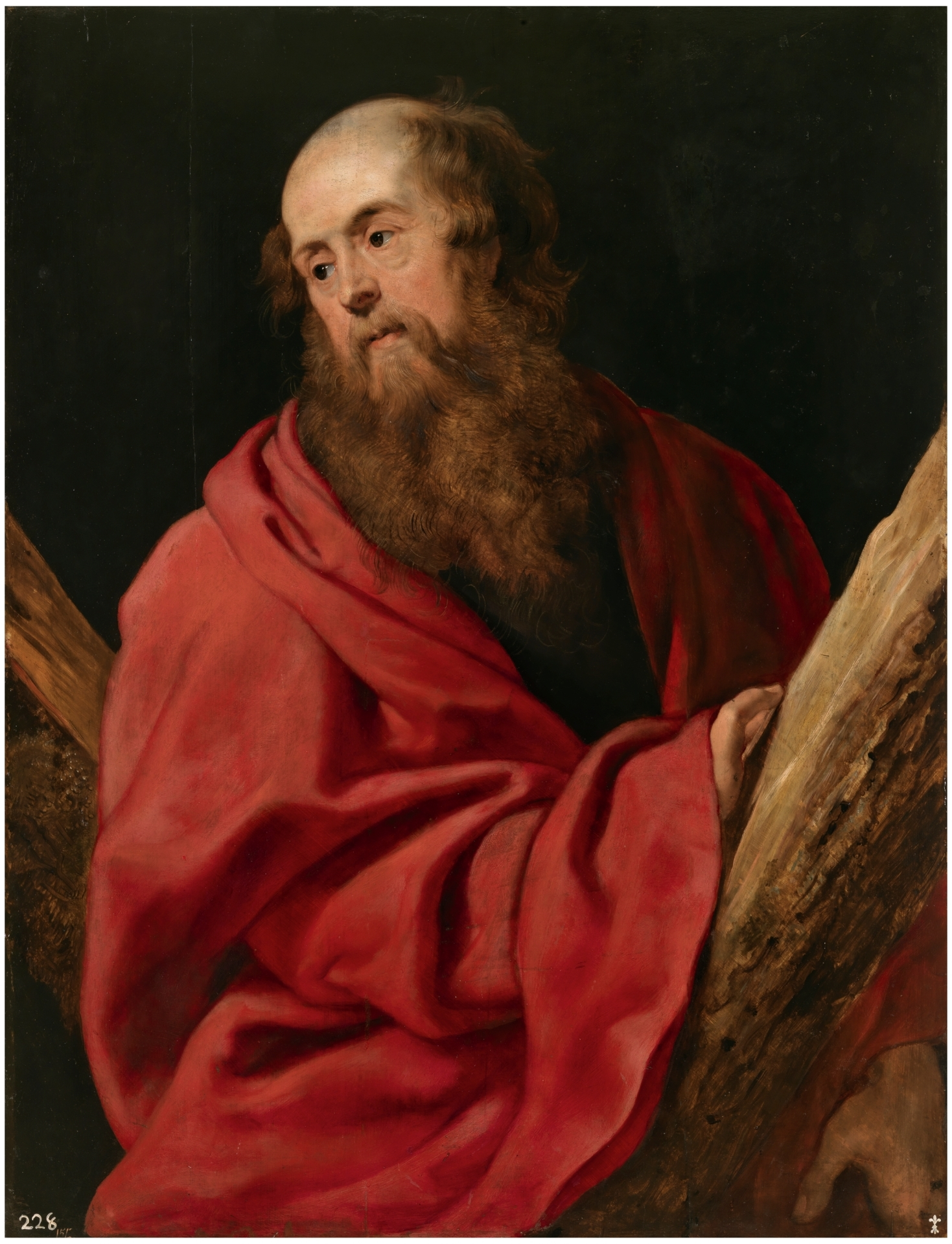
- Saint Andrew by Peter Paul Rubens (c. 1611)

Apostle and Martyr the First-Called
- Born: c. 5 AD; Bethsaida, Galilee, Roman Empire
- Died: 60/70 AD; Patras, Achaea, Roman Empire
- Venerated in: All Christian denominations which venerate saints
- Major shrine: St Andrew's Cathedral, Patras, Greece; St Mary's Cathedral, Edinburgh, Scotland; The Church of St Andrew and St Albert, Warsaw, Poland; Duomo Cathedral in Amalfi and Sarzana Cathedral in Sarzana, Italy
- Feast: 30 November
- Attributes: Long white hair and beard, holding the Gospel Book or scroll, leaning on a saltire, fishing net
- Patronage: Scotland, Barbados, Georgia, Russia, Ukraine, Greece, Cyprus, Constantinople, Romania, Patras, Burgundy, Galicia (Spain), A Coruña, San Andrés (Tenerife), Diocese of Parañaque, Candaba, Masinloc, Telhado, Sarzana, Pienza, Amalfi, Luqa (Malta), Fontana, Gozo (Malta), Manila and Prussia; Diocese of Victoria, Canada; Fishermen, fishmongers, rope-makers, textile workers, singers, miners, pregnant women, butchers, farm workers, Russian Navy, US Army Rangers; protection against sore throats, convulsions, fever and whooping cough

Andrew the Apostle (Koine Greek: Ἀνδρέας, romanized: Andréas [anˈdre.aːs̠]; Latin: Andreas [än̪ˈd̪reː.äːs]) was an apostle of Jesus. According to the New Testament, he was a fisherman and one of the Twelve Apostles chosen by Jesus.

The title First-Called (Πρωτόκλητος, Prōtoklētos) used by the Eastern Orthodox Church stems from the Gospel of John, where Andrew, initially a disciple of John the Baptist, follows Jesus and, recognising him as the Messiah, introduces his brother Simon Peter to him.

According to Eastern Orthodox tradition, the apostolic successor to Andrew is the Ecumenical Patriarch of Constantinople.

== Life ==
=== Early life ===
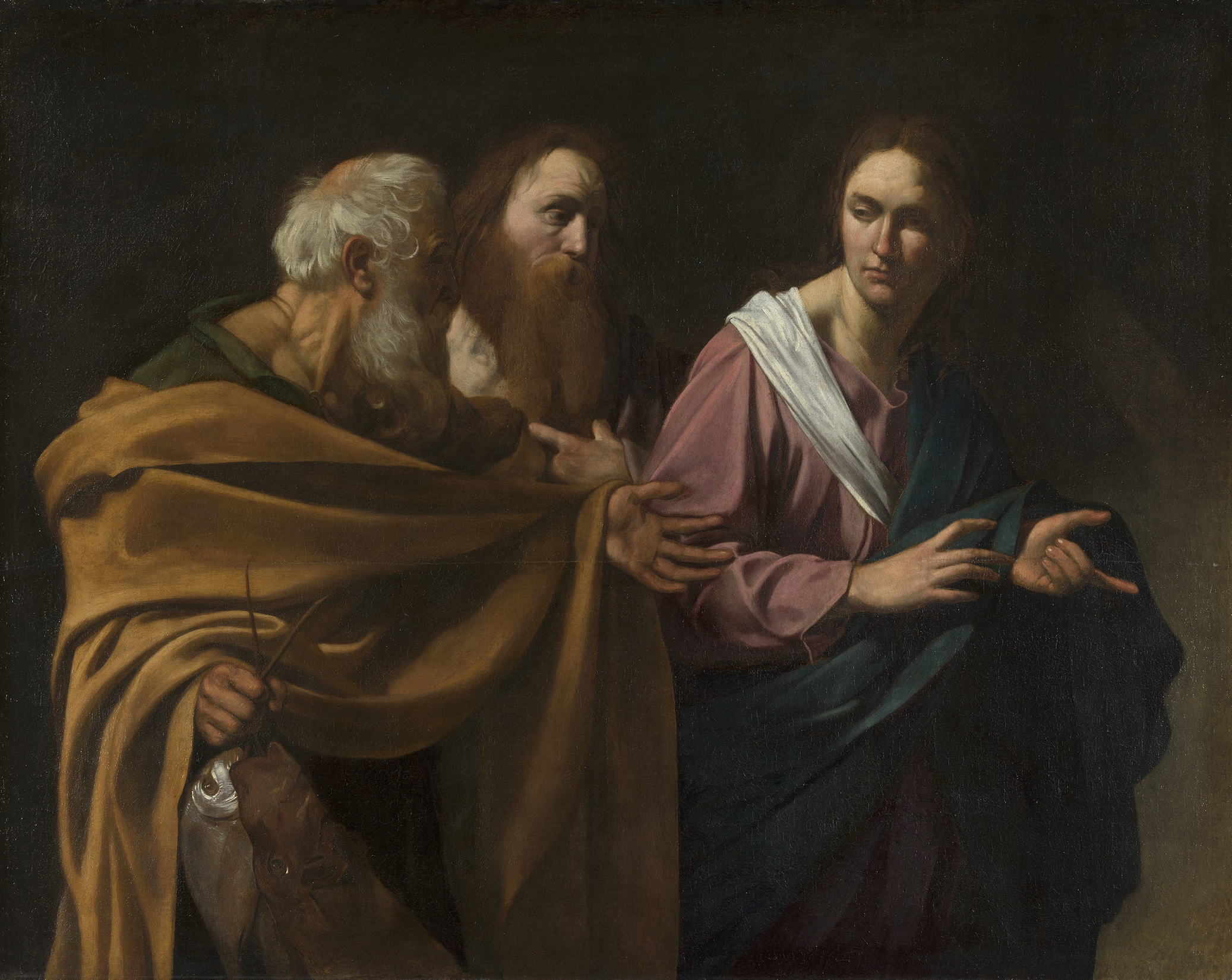
The Calling of Saints Peter and Andrew by Caravaggio (1603–1606)

The name "Andrew" (meaning manly, brave, from Ancient Greek: ἀνδρεία, romanized: andreía, lit. 'manhood, valor'), like other Greek names, appears to have been common among the Jews and other Hellenised people since the second or third century B.C. No Hebrew or Aramaic name is recorded for him.

Andrew the Apostle was born to a Jewish family in Bethsaida, in Galilee, possibly between 5 and 10 AD. The New Testament states that Andrew was the brother of Simon Peter, and likewise a son of Jonah. "The first striking characteristic of Andrew is his name: it is not Hebrew, as might have been expected, but Greek, indicative of a certain cultural openness in his family that cannot be ignored. We are in Galilee, where the Greek language and culture are quite present".

=== With Jesus ===
Both Andrew and his brother Peter were fishermen by trade, hence the tradition that Jesus called them to be his disciples by saying that he will make them "fishers of men" (Ancient Greek: ἁλιεῖς ἀνθρώπων, romanized: halieîs anthrṓpōn). According to Mark 1:29, at the beginning of Jesus' public life, they occupied the same house at Capernaum.

In the Gospel of Matthew and in the Gospel of Mark Simon Peter and Andrew were both called together to become disciples of Jesus and "fishers of men". These narratives record that Jesus was walking along the shore of the Sea of Galilee, observed Simon and Andrew fishing, and called them to discipleship.

In the parallel incident in the Gospel of Luke Andrew is not named, nor is reference made to Simon having a brother. In this narrative, Jesus initially used a boat, solely described as being Simon's, as a platform for preaching to the multitudes on the shore and then as a means to achieving a huge trawl of fish on a night which had hitherto proved fruitless. The narrative indicates that Simon was not the only fisherman in the boat (they signalled to their partners in the other boat ...) but it is not until the next chapter that Andrew is named as Simon's brother. However, it is generally understood that Andrew was fishing with Simon on the night in question. Matthew Poole, in his Annotations on the Holy Bible, stressed that "Luke denies not that Andrew was there".

The Gospel of John states that Andrew was a disciple of John the Baptist, whose testimony first led him, and another unnamed disciple of John the Baptist, traditionally believed to be John the Apostle, to follow Jesus and spend the day with him, thus becoming the first two disciples called by Jesus. Andrew at once recognized Jesus as the Messiah and hastened to introduce him to his brother. For this reason the Eastern Orthodox Church honours him with the name Protokletos, which means "the first called". Thenceforth, the two brothers were disciples of Christ. On a subsequent occasion, prior to the final call to the apostolate, they were called to a closer companionship, and then they left all things to follow Jesus.

Subsequently, in the gospels, Andrew is referred to as being present on some important occasions as one of the disciples more closely attached to Jesus. (Note: Bible: Mark 13:3; Bible: John 6:8, Bible: 12:22; but in Acts of the Apostles there is only one mention of him. Bible: Acts 1:13) Andrew told Jesus about the boy with the loaves and fishes, and when certain Greeks went to see Jesus, they came to Philip, but Philip then had recourse to Andrew. Andrew was present at the Last Supper. Andrew was one of the four disciples who came to Jesus on the Mount of Olives to ask about the signs of Jesus' return at the "end of the age".

=== After Jesus' Ascension ===
Eusebius in his Church History 3.1 (4th century) quoted Origen (c. 185 – c. 253) as saying that Andrew preached in Scythia. According to the 12th-century Primary Chronicle, Andrew visited Scythia and Greek colonies along the northern coast of the Black Sea before making his way to Chersonesus in Crimea. According to the legend, attributed to Nestor the Chronicler, Andrew reached the future capital of Kievan Rus' and foretold the foundation of a great Christian city with many churches. Then, "he came to the [land of the] Slovenians where Novgorod now [stands]" and observed the locals, before eventually arriving in Rome.

According to Hippolytus of Rome, Andrew preached in Thrace, and his presence in Byzantium is mentioned in the apocryphal Acts of Andrew. According to tradition, he founded the see of Byzantium (later Constantinople) in 38 AD, installing Stachys as bishop. This diocese became the seat of the Patriarchate of Constantinople under Anatolius, in 451. Andrew, along with Stachys, is recognized as the patron saint of the Patriarchate. Basil of Seleucia (5th century) also knew of Apostle Andrew's missions in Thrace, Scythia and Achaea.

==== Martyrdom ====
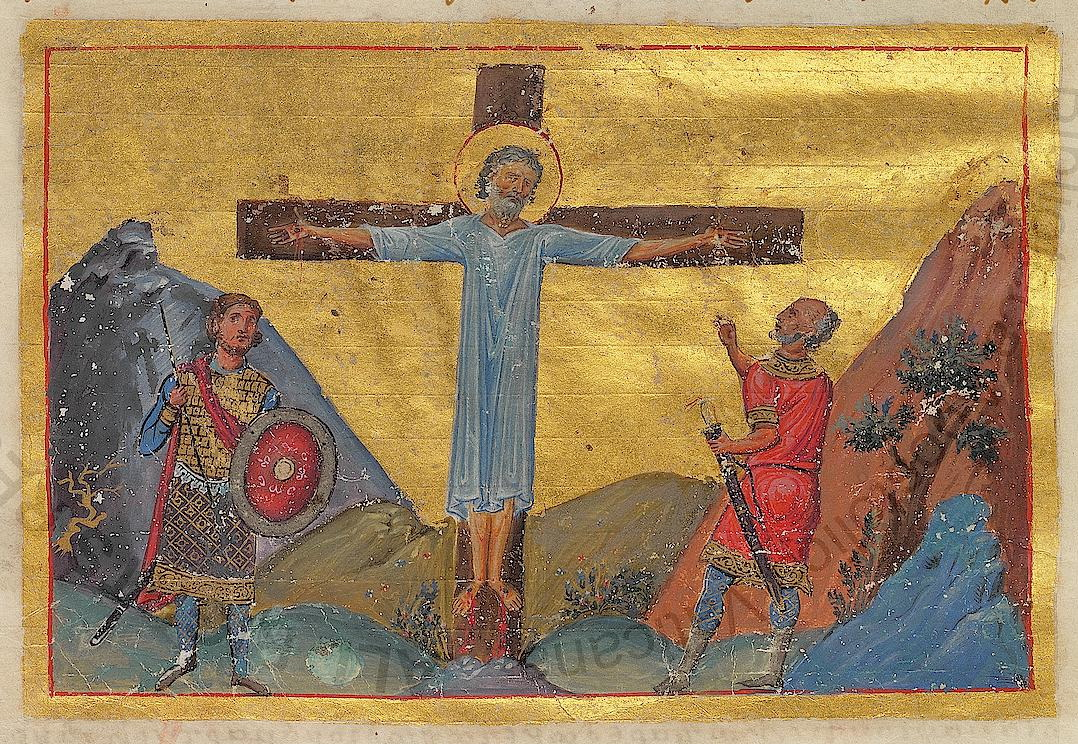
The crucifixion of Andrew the Apostle, miniature from the Menologion of Basil II

Andrew is said to have been martyred by crucifixion at the city of Patras (Patræ) in Achaea, in AD 60. Early texts, such as the Acts of Andrew known to Gregory of Tours (6th century), describe Andrew as bound, not nailed, to a Latin cross of the kind on which Jesus is said to have been crucified; yet a tradition developed that Andrew had been crucified on a crux decussata (X-shaped cross, or "saltire"), now commonly known as a "Saint Andrew's Cross" — supposedly at his own request, as he deemed himself unworthy to be crucified on the same type of cross as Jesus had been. (Note: The legends surrounding Andrew are discussed in Dvornik 1958) The iconography of the martyrdom of Andrew – showing him bound to an X-shaped cross – does not appear to have been standardized until the later Middle Ages. (Note: According to Réau 1958, p. 79, St. Andrew's Cross appeared for the first time in the tenth century, but did not become an iconographic standard before the seventeenth. Calvert 1984 was unable to find a sculptural representation of Andrew on the saltire cross earlier than an architectural capital from Quercy, of the early twelfth century.)

== The Acts of Andrew ==
The apocryphal Acts of Andrew, mentioned by Eusebius, Epiphanius of Salamis, and others, is among a disparate group of Acts of the Apostles that were traditionally attributed to Leucius Charinus, but it shows several signs of a mid-2nd-century origin. It describes the supposed travels of the title character, the miracles he performed during them, and finally a description of his martyrdom. Eusebius knew the work, which he dismissed as the product of a heretic and absurd. The Acts, as well as a Gospel of St Andrew, appear among rejected books in the Decretum Gelasianum connected with the name of Pope Gelasius I. Dennis MacDonald posits the theory that the non-canonical Acts of Andrew was a Christian retelling of Homer's Odyssey.

== Relics ==
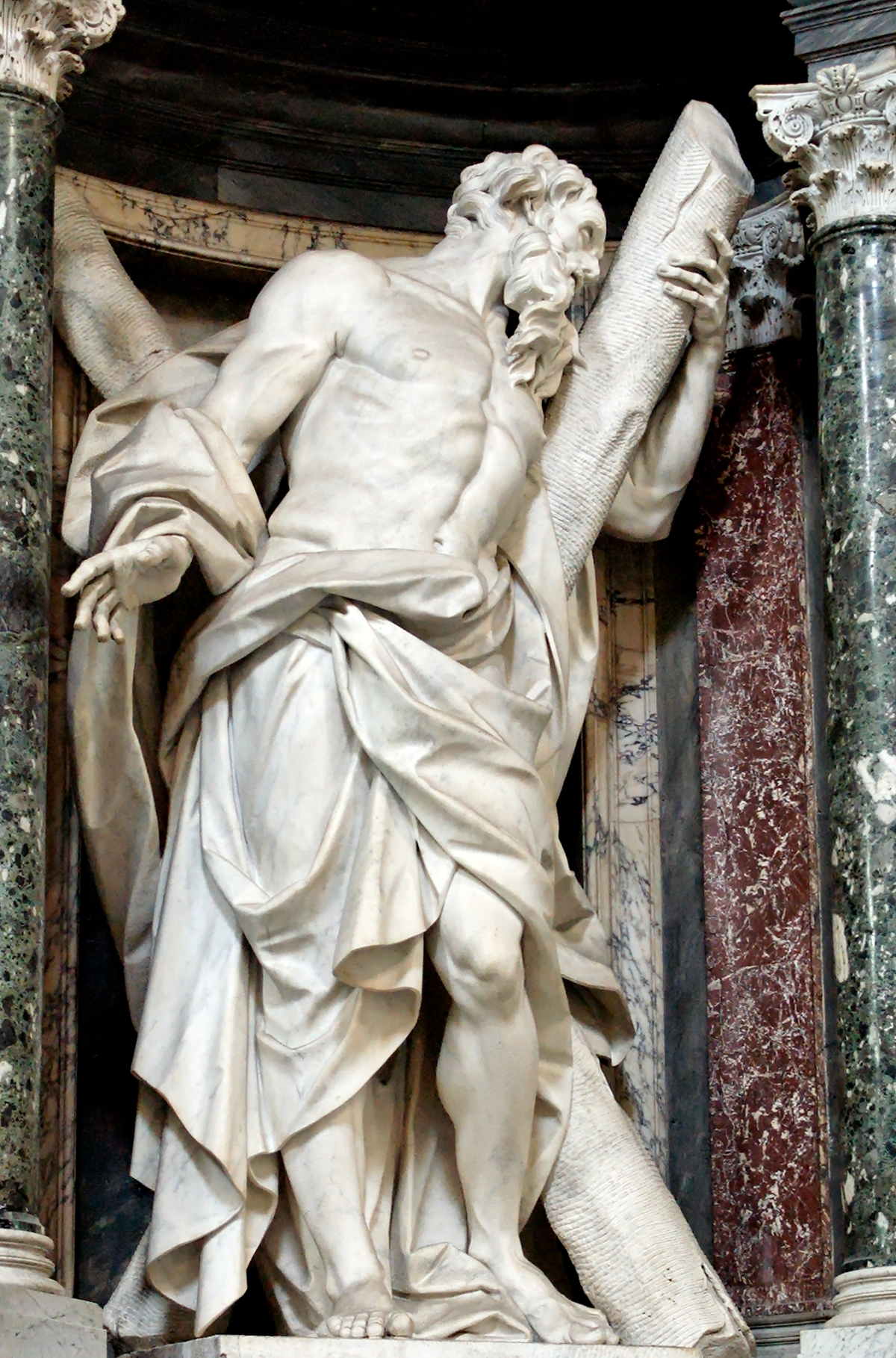
Statue of Andrew in the Archbasilica of St. John Lateran by Camillo Rusconi (1713–1715)

Relics alleged to be those of the Apostle Andrew are kept at the Cathedral of Saint Andrew, Patras, Greece; in Amalfi Cathedral (the Duomo di Sant'Andrea), Amalfi and in Sarzana Cathedral in Sarzana, Italy; St Mary's Cathedral, Edinburgh, Scotland; and the Church of St Andrew and St Albert, Warsaw, Poland. There are also numerous smaller reliquaries throughout the world.

Andrew's remains were preserved at Patras. According to one legend, Regulus (Rule), a monk at Patras, was advised in a dream to hide some of the bones. Shortly thereafter, most of the relics were transferred from Patras to Constantinople by order of the Roman emperor Constantius II around 357 and deposited in the Church of the Holy Apostles.

Regulus was said to have had a second dream in which an angel advised him to take the hidden relics "to the ends of the earth" for protection. Wherever he was shipwrecked, he was to build a shrine for them. He set sail, taking with him a kneecap, an upper arm bone, three fingers, and a tooth. He sailed west, towards the edge of the known world, and was shipwrecked on the coast of Fife, Scotland. However, the relics were probably brought to Britain in 597 as part of the Augustine Mission, and then in 732 to Fife, by Bishop Acca of Hexham, a well-known collector of religious relics.

The skull of Saint Andrew, which had been taken to Constantinople, was returned to Patras by Byzantine emperor Basil I, who ruled from 867 to 886.

In 1208, following the sack of Constantinople, those relics of Saint Andrew and Saint Peter which remained in the imperial city were taken to Amalfi, Italy, by Cardinal Peter of Capua the Elder, a native of Amalfi. The relics were enshrined in the crypt of the cathedral. Most of the relics of the apostle, including an occipital bone, are still there.

Thomas Palaiologos was the youngest surviving son of Byzantine Emperor Manuel II Palaiologos. Thomas ruled the province of Morea, the medieval name for the Peloponnese. In 1461, when the Ottomans crossed the Strait of Corinth, Palaiologos fled Patras for exile in Italy, bringing with him what was purported to be the skull of Saint Andrew. He gave the head to Pope Pius II, who had it enshrined in one of the four central piers of St. Peter's Basilica in the Vatican and then in Pienza, Italy.

In September 1964, Pope Paul VI, as a gesture of goodwill toward the Greek Orthodox Church, ordered that the one relic of Saint Andrew held in Vatican City be returned to Patras. Cardinal Augustin Bea, head of the Vatican's Dicastery for Promoting Christian Unity, led a delegation that presented the skull to Bishop Constantine of Patras on 24 September 1964. The cross of Saint Andrew was taken from Greece during the Crusades by the Duke of Burgundy. It was kept in the church of St Victor in Marseille until it returned to Patras on 19 January 1980. The cross of the apostle was presented to the Bishop of Patras Nicodemus by a Catholic delegation led by Cardinal Roger Etchegaray. All the relics, which consist of the small finger, the skull (part of the top of the cranium of Saint Andrew), and the cross on which he was martyred, have been kept in the Church of St. Andrew at Patras in a special shrine and are revered in a special ceremony every 30 November, his feast day.

In 2006, the Catholic Church, again through Cardinal Etchegaray, gave the Greek Orthodox Church another relic of Saint Andrew.

== Liturgical commemoration ==
=== Eastern Orthodoxy ===
The Eastern Orthodox Church commemorates the Apostle Andrew on several days throughout the church calendar. Fixed days of commemoration include:

- 20 June – The Translation of the Relics of the Apostles Andrew, Thomas, and Luke; the Prophet Elisha; and the Martyr Lazarus;
- 30 June – The Twelve Apostles;
- 26 September – The Translation of the skull of Andrew in 1964;
- 30 November – Primary Feast Day.

There are also days which are movable:

- The Sunday before 30 November – Synaxis of the Saints of Achaea;
- The Sunday of the Samaritan Woman – Synaxis of the all the Holy Fathers, Archbishops, and Patriarchs of Constantinople.

=== Catholic Church ===
The Roman Catholic Church commemorates Andrew on 30 November.

== Traditions and legends ==
=== Georgia ===
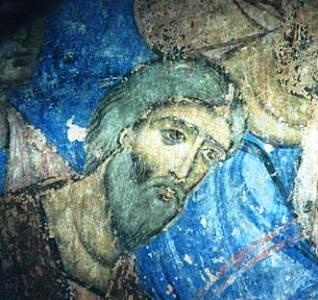
A 13th-century fresco depicting Saint Andrew, from Kintsvisi Monastery, Georgia

The church tradition of Georgia regards Andrew as the first preacher of Christianity in the territory of Georgia and as the founder of the Georgian church. This tradition derives from Byzantine sources, particularly Niketas David Paphlagon (died c. 890) who asserts that "Andrew preached to the Iberians, Sauromatians, Taurians, and Scythians and to every region and city, on the Black Sea, both north and south." The version was adopted by the 10th–11th-century Georgian ecclesiastics and, refurbished with more details, was inserted in the Georgian Chronicles. The story of Andrew's mission in the Georgian lands endowed the Georgian church with apostolic origin and served as a defence argument to George the Hagiorite against the encroachments from the Antiochian church authorities on autocephaly of the Georgian church. Another Georgian monk, Ephraim the Minor, produced a thesis, reconciling Andrew's story with an earlier evidence of the 4th-century conversion of Georgians by Nino and explaining the necessity of the "second Christening" by Nino. The thesis was made canonical by the Georgian church council in 1103. The Georgian Orthodox Church marks two feast days in honour of Saint Andrew, on 12 May and 13 December. The former date, dedicated to Andrew's arrival in Georgia, is a public holiday in Georgia.

=== Cyprus ===
Cypriot tradition holds that a ship which was transporting Andrew went off course and ran aground. Upon coming ashore, Andrew struck the rocks with his staff at which point a spring of healing waters gushed forth. Using it, the sight of the ship's captain, who had been blind in one eye, was restored. Thereafter, the site became a place of pilgrimage and a fortified monastery, the Apostolos Andreas Monastery, stood there in the 12th century, from which Isaac Comnenus of Cyprus negotiated his surrender to Richard the Lionheart. In the 15th century, a small chapel was built close to the shore. The main monastery of the current church dates to the 18th century.

Other pilgrimages are more recent. The story is told that in 1895, the son of a Maria Georgiou was kidnapped. Seventeen years later, Andrew appeared to her in a dream, telling her to pray for her son's return at the monastery. Living in Anatolia, she embarked on the crossing to Cyprus on a very crowded boat. As she was telling her story during the journey, one of the passengers, a young Dervish priest, became more and more interested. Asking if her son had any distinguishing marks, he stripped off his clothes to reveal the same marks, and mother and son were thus reunited.

Apostolos Andreas Monastery (Greek: Απόστολος Ανδρέας) is a monastery dedicated to Saint Andrew situated just south of Cape Apostolos Andreas, which is the north-easternmost point of the island of Cyprus, in Rizokarpaso in the Karpass Peninsula. The monastery is an important site to the Cypriot Orthodox Church. It was once known as "the Lourdes of Cyprus", served not by an organized community of monks but by a changing group of volunteer priests and laymen. Both Greek Cypriot and Turkish Cypriot communities consider the monastery a holy place. As such, it is visited by many people for votive prayers.

=== Malta ===
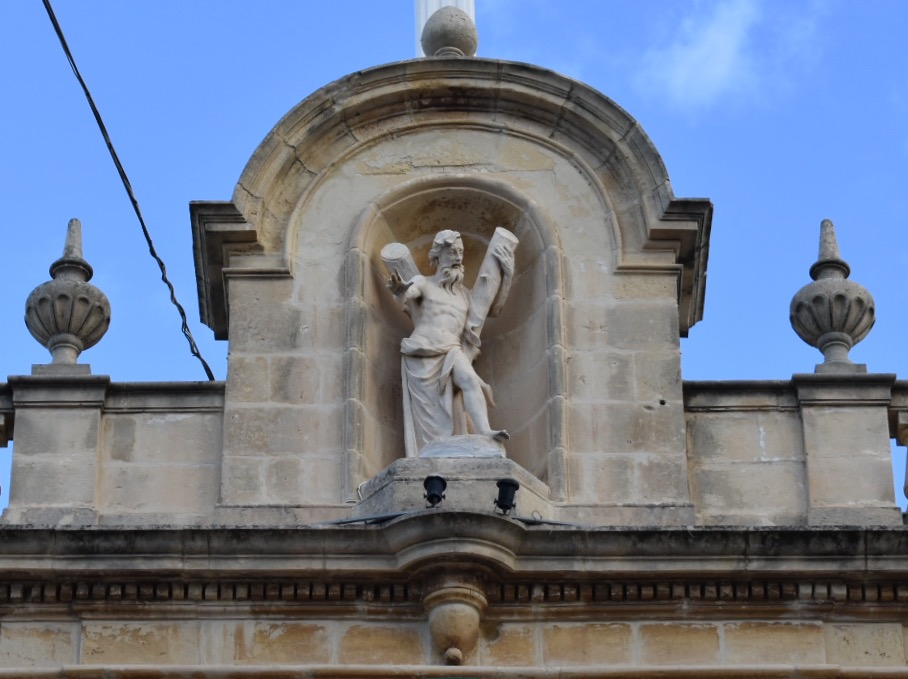
Niche of St. Andrew (Luqa)

St. Andrew (Maltese: Sant' Andrija) is the patron saint of Luqa. The patron saint's traditional feast (festa) is celebrated on the first Sunday of July, with the liturgical feast being celebrated on 30 November. A local niche dedicated to him is found in Luqa, which is two storeys high. The first reference regards the small chapel at Luqa dedicated to Andrew dates to 1497. This chapel contained three altars, one of them dedicated to Andrew. The painting showing Mary with Saints Andrew and Paul was painted by the Maltese artist Filippo Dingli. At one time, many fishermen lived in the village of Luqa, and this may be the main reason for choosing Andrew as patron saint. The statue of Andrew was sculpted in wood by Giuseppe Scolaro in 1779. This statue underwent several restoration works including that of 1913 performed by the Maltese artist Abraham Gatt. The Martyrdom of Saint Andrew on the main altar of the church was painted by Mattia Preti in 1687.

=== Romania ===
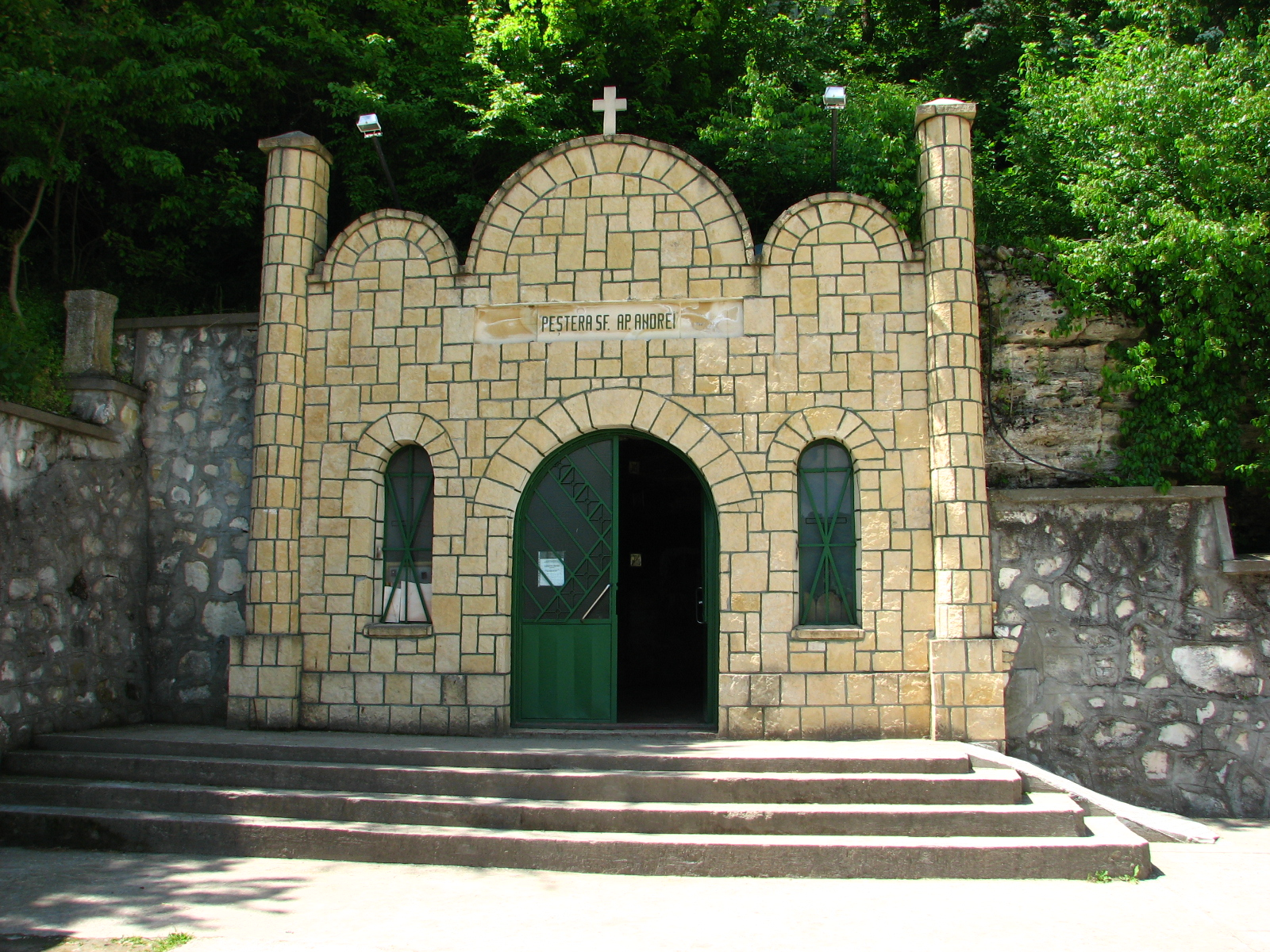
Entrance to Saint Andrew's caves near Ion Corvin, Constanța County

Saint Andrew is the patron saint of Romania. The official stance of the Romanian Orthodox Church is that Andrew preached the Gospel in the province of Dobruja (Scythia Minor), where he is said to have converted the local population to Christianity. This tradition was not widely acknowledged until the 20th century, although it finds support in the Church History of Eusebius.

According to Hippolytus of Rome (died c. 250) in his On Apostles, Origen in the third book of his Commentaries on the Genesis (254 AD), Eusebius in his Church History (340 AD), and other sources including Usaard's Martyrdom (845–865), and Jacobus de Voragine's Golden Legend (c. 1260), Andrew preached in Scythia, a possible reference to Scythia Minor, corresponding to the modern-day regions of Northern Dobruja (part of Romania) and Southern Dobruja (part of Bulgaria). Hippolytus also records that Andrew preached among the Thracians.

Although the prevalence of Latin vocabulary for Christian concepts in the Romanian language may point to the antiquity of Daco-Roman Christianity, some modern Romanian scholars consider the idea of early Christianisation (predating the Edict of Milan) to be unsustainable. They regard it as part of the ideology of Dacianism, which asserts that the Eastern Orthodox Church has been a constant companion and defender of the Romanian people throughout their entire history, a notion they argue was exploited for propaganda purposes during the communist era. Historians such as Ioan-Aurel Pop, however, consider Romanians to be the first among the peoples now inhabiting the territories bordering Romania to have adopted Christianity, with conversion before the third century, during the period of the province of Roman Dacia, dissolved c. AD 271/275, playing a significant role in the Romanian ethnogenesis.

Scholar Mircea Eliade argued in favor of structural links between Zamolxism and Christianity, suggesting a greater receptiveness to early conversion among the local population. If Andrew the Apostle preached in Dobruja (in proximity to Thrace, where he is also said to have preached) rather than in Crimea as held by the Russian Orthodox Church, Christianity in Romania may be considered of apostolic origin.

Between the 4th and 6th centuries, the region of Scythia Minor played an influential role in the development of Christian theology. (Note: Several Scythian Monks, such as Dionysius Exiguus, had been of romanized Geto-Dacian origin.)

=== Russia and Ukraine ===
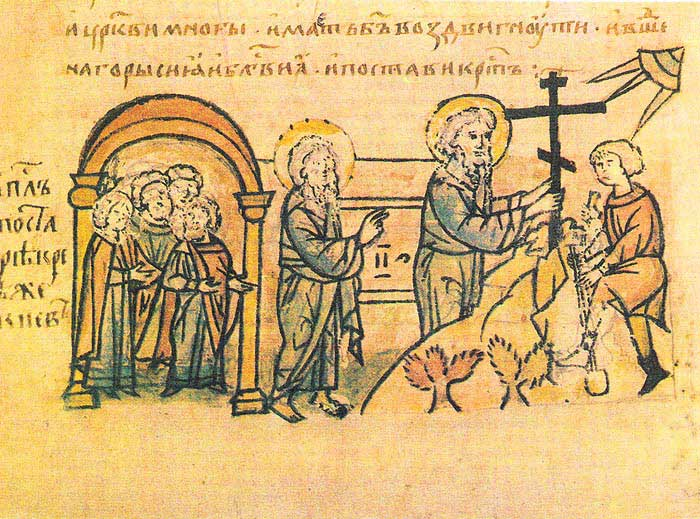
Saint Andrew's prophecy of Kiev, depicted in the Radziwiłł Chronicle

One of the foundational narratives associated with the history of Orthodoxy in Russia is found in the 12th-century Primary Chronicle, written in Kiev, which says that the Apostle Andrew visited Scythia and Greek colonies along the northern coast of the Black Sea before making his way to Chersonesus in Crimea. According to this legend, Andrew reached the future location of the capital of Kievan Rus' and foretold the foundation of a great Christian city in Kiev with many churches. Then, "he came to the [land of the] Slovenians where Novgorod now [stands]" and observed the locals, before eventually arriving in Rome. Despite the lack of historical evidence supporting this narrative, modern church historians in Russia have often incorporated this tale into their studies. The same tale is also found in Ukrainian ecclesiastical discourse.

=== Scotland ===
The Saltire (or "Saint Andrew's Cross") is the national flag of Scotland.

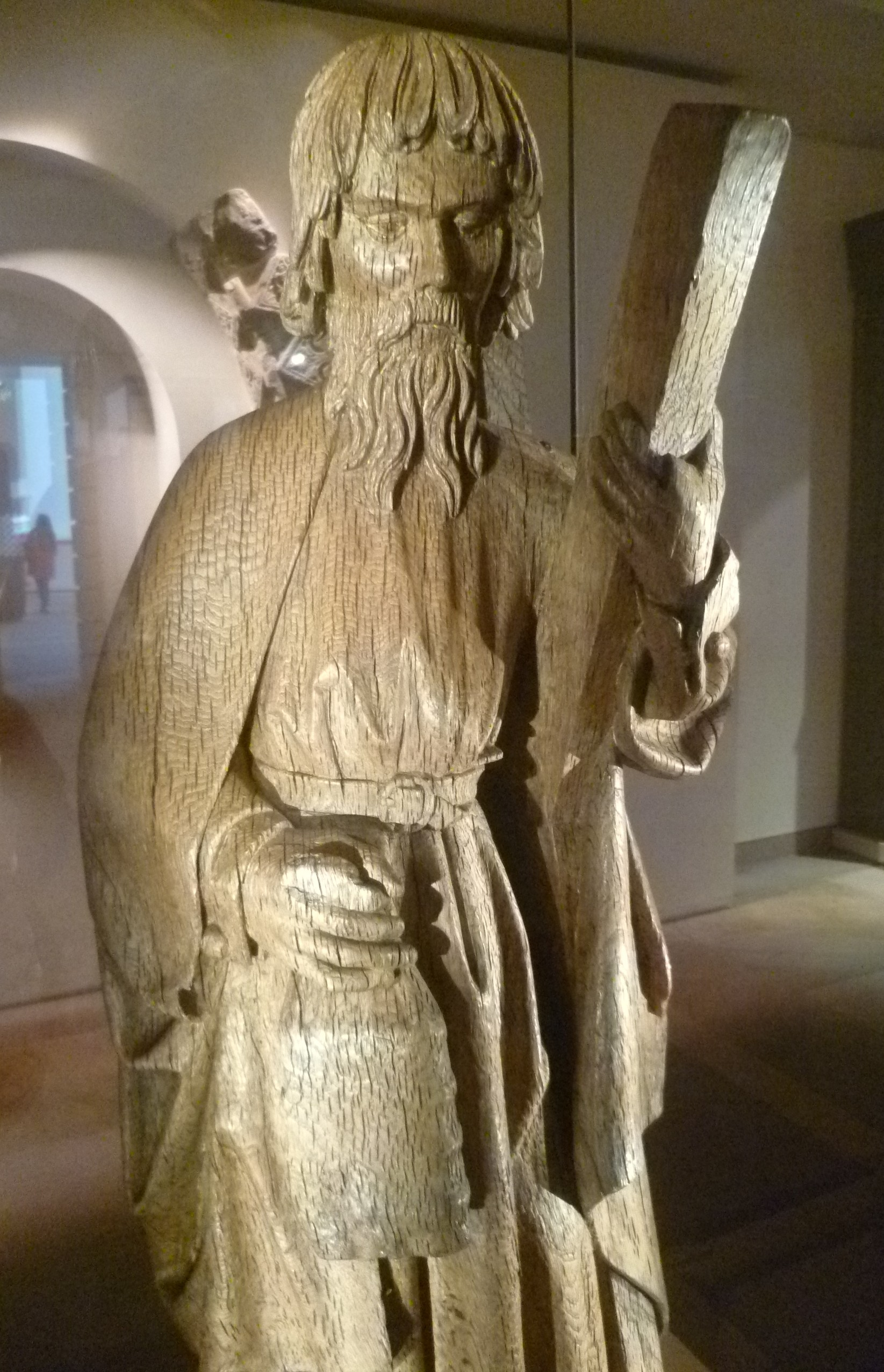
Saint Andrew (carving c. 1500) in the National Museum of Scotland

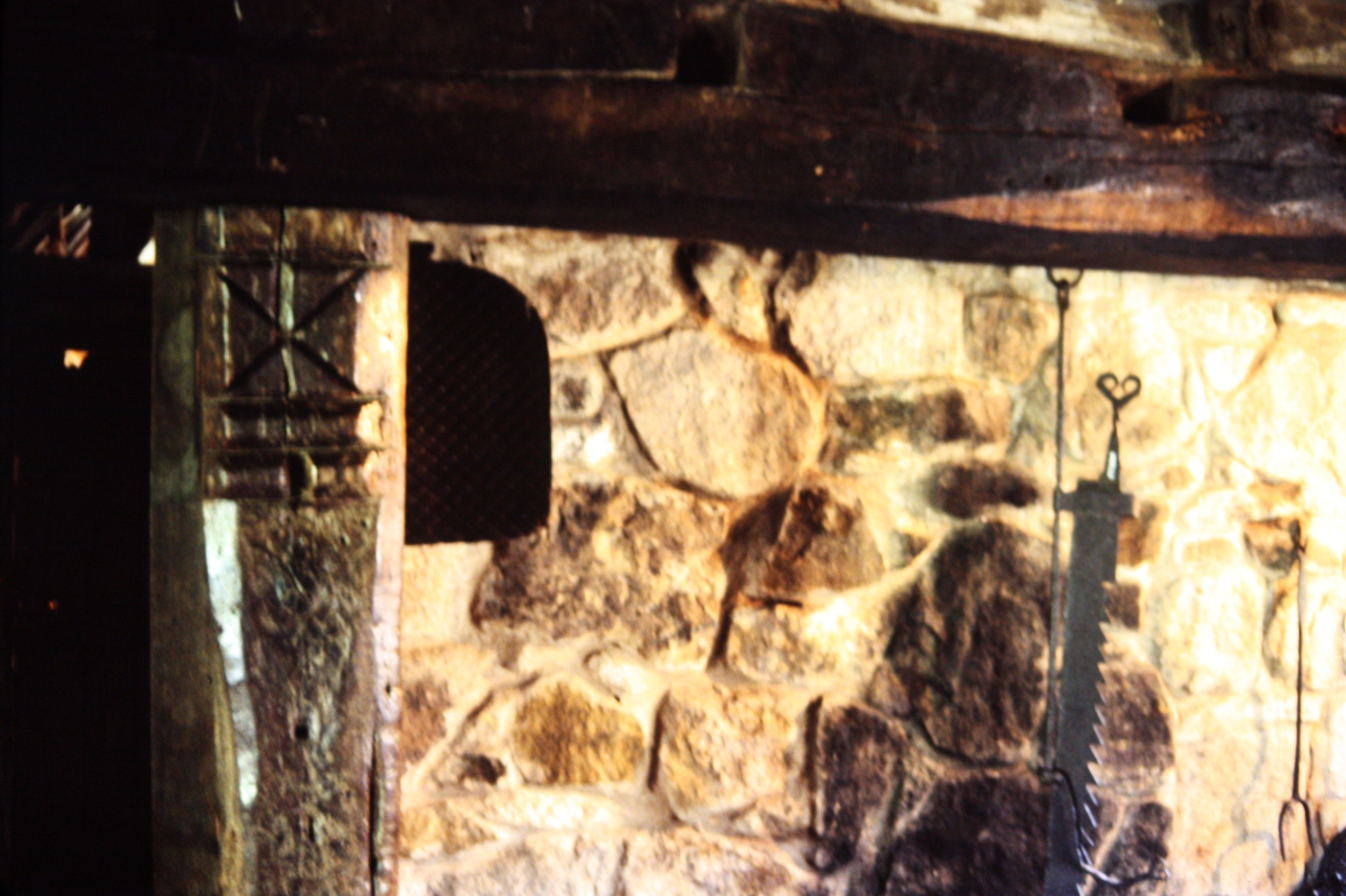
Traditional stone fireplace in northern England. The carved Saint Andrew's cross in the left-hand wooden post was to prevent witches from flying down the chimney, in Ryedale Folk Museum, Hutton-le-Hole.

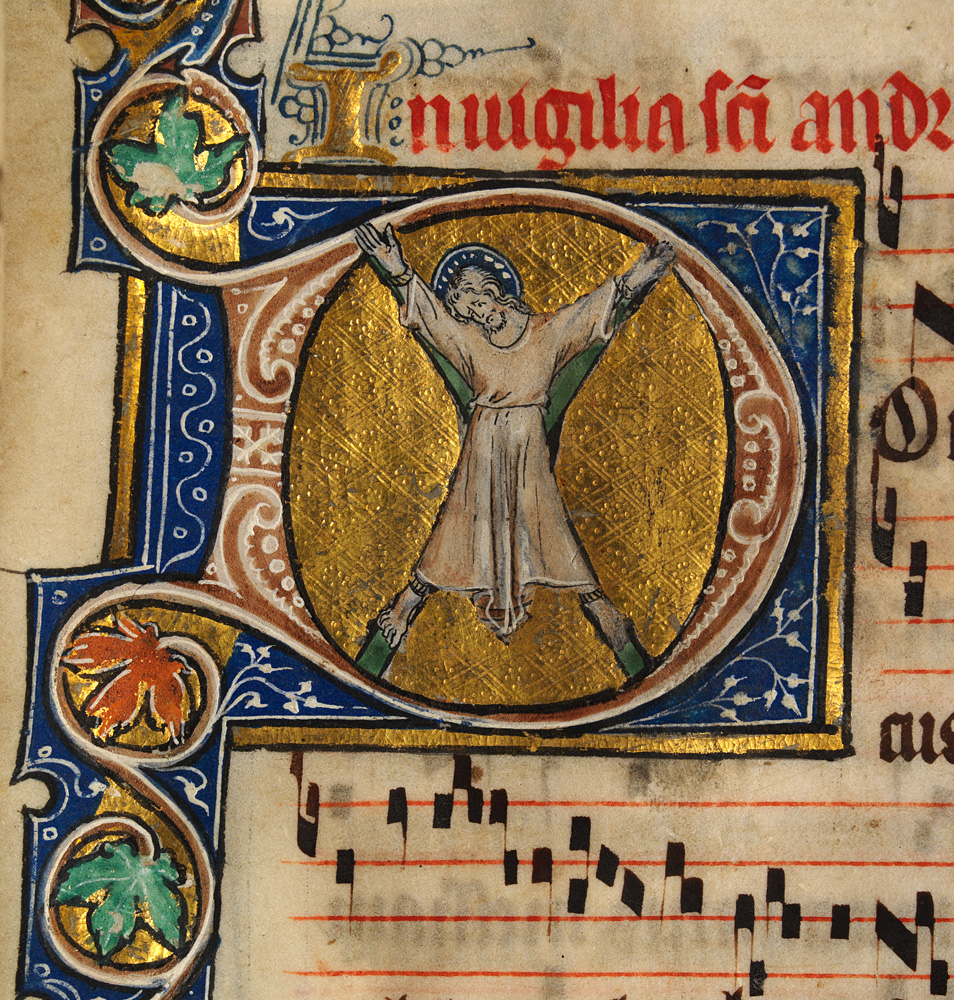
Saint Andrew martyred on a decussate cross (miniature from an East Anglian missal, c. 1320)

Several legends claim that the relics of Andrew were brought by divine guidance from Constantinople to the place where the modern Scottish town of St Andrews stands today (Gaelic, Cill Rìmhinn). The oldest surviving manuscripts are two: one is among the manuscripts collected by Jean-Baptiste Colbert and willed to Louis XIV, now in the Bibliothèque Nationale, Paris; the other is in the Harley Collection in the British Library, London. They state that the relics of Andrew were brought by one Regulus to the Pictish king Óengus mac Fergusa (729–761). The only historical Regulus (Riagail or Rule) whose name is preserved in the tower of St Rule was an Irish monk expelled from Ireland with Columba; his dates, however, are c. 573 – 600. There are good reasons for supposing that the relics were originally in the collection of Acca, bishop of Hexham, who took them into Pictish country when he was driven from Hexham (c. 732), and founded a see, not, according to tradition, in Galloway, but on the site of St Andrews.

According to legendary accounts given in 16th-century historiography, Óengus II in AD 832 led an army of Picts and Scots into battle against the Angles, led by Æthelstan of East Anglia, near modern-day Athelstaneford, East Lothian. The legend states that he was heavily outnumbered and hence whilst engaged in prayer on the eve of battle, Óengus vowed that if granted victory he would appoint Andrew as the patron saint of Scotland. On the morning of battle white clouds forming an X shape in the sky were said to have appeared. Óengus and his combined force, emboldened by this apparent divine intervention, took to the field and despite being inferior in numbers were victorious. Having interpreted the cloud phenomenon as representing the crux decussata upon which Andrew was believed to have been crucified, Óengus honoured his pre-battle pledge and duly appointed Andrew as the patron saint of Scotland. The white saltire set against a celestial blue background is said to have been adopted as the design of the flag of Scotland on the basis of this legend. However, there is evidence that Andrew was venerated in Scotland before this.

Andrew's connection with Scotland may have been reinforced following the Synod of Whitby, when the Celtic Church felt that Columba had been "outranked" by Peter and that Peter's brother would make a higher-ranking patron. The 1320 Declaration of Arbroath cites Scotland's conversion to Christianity by Andrew, "the first to be an Apostle". Numerous parish churches in the Church of Scotland and congregations of other Christian churches in Scotland are named after Andrew. The former national church of the Scottish people in Rome, Sant'Andrea degli Scozzesi, was dedicated to Saint Andrew.

A local superstition uses the cross of Saint Andrew as a hex sign on the fireplaces in northern England and Scotland to prevent witches from flying down the chimney and entering the house to do mischief. By placing the Saint Andrew's cross on one of the fireplace posts or lintels, witches are prevented from entering through this opening. In this case, it is similar to the use of a witch ball, although the cross will actively prevent witches from entering, whereas the witch ball will passively delay or entice the witch, and perhaps entrap it.

The National Shrine of Saint Andrew is located at St Mary's Cathedral, Edinburgh.

=== Spain ===
St. Andrew was the patron saint of the Dukes of Burgundy. A form of St. Andrew's cross called the Cross de Bourgogne was used as the flag of the Duchy of Burgundy, and after the duchy was acquired by Spain, by the Spanish Crown, and later as a Spanish naval flag and finally as an army battle flag up until 1843. Today, it is still a part of various Spanish military insignia and forms part of the coat of arms of the king of Spain.

In Spain, Andrew is the patron of several locations: San Andrés (Santa Cruz de Tenerife), San Andrés y Sauces (La Palma), Navalmoral de la Mata (Cáceres), Éibar (Gipuzkoa), Baeza (Jaén), Pobladura de Pelayo García and Pobladura de Yuso (León), Berlangas de Roa (Burgos), Ligüerzana (Palencia), Castillo de Bayuela (Toledo), Almoradí (Alicante), Estella (Navarra), Sant Andreu de Palomar (Barcelona), Pujalt (Catalonia), Adamuz (Córdoba) and San Andrés in Cameros (La Rioja).

== Legacy ==
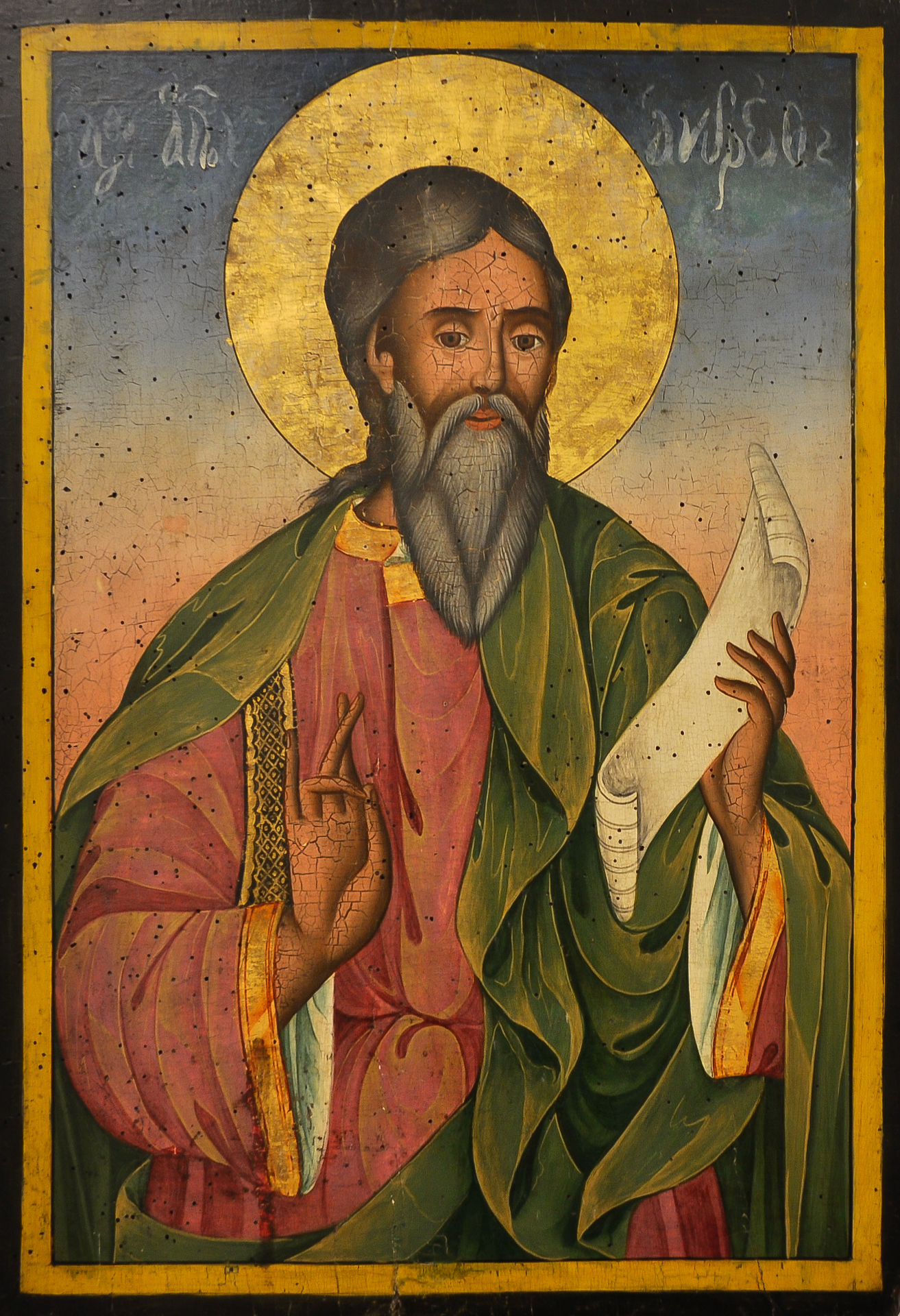
Saint Andrew the Apostle by Yoan from Gabrovo, 19th century

Andrew is the patron saint of several countries and cities, including Barbados, Romania, Russia, Scotland, Ukraine, Sarzana, Pienza and Amalfi in Italy, Penrith in England, Esgueira in Portugal, Luqa in Malta, Parañaque in the Philippines and Patras in Greece. He was also the patron saint of Prussia and of the Order of the Golden Fleece. He is considered the founder and the first bishop of the Church of Byzantium and is consequently the patron saint of the Ecumenical Patriarchate of Constantinople. Thus, Pope Benedict XVI calls him "the Apostle of the Greek world," and since he is the brother of Saint Peter, the first bishop of Rome, their brotherhood is "symbolically expressed in the special reciprocal relations of the See of Rome and of Constantinople, which are truly Sister Churches."

The flag of Scotland (and consequently the Union Flag and those of some of the former colonies of the British Empire) feature Saint Andrew's saltire cross. The saltire is also the flag of Tenerife, the former flag of Galicia and the Russian Navy Ensign.

The feast of Andrew is observed on 30 November in both the Eastern and Western churches, and is a bank holiday in Scotland, There are week-long celebrations in the town of St Andrews and in some other Scottish cities.

In the Catholic Church, Advent begins with First Vespers of the Sunday that falls on or closest to the feast of Saint Andrew. Andrew the Apostle is remembered in the Church of England with a Festival on 30 November.

== In Islam ==
The Qur'anic account of the disciples of Jesus does not include their names, numbers, or any detailed accounts of their lives. Muslim exegesis, however, more or less agrees with the New Testament list and says that the disciples included Andrew.

== In art ==
- St. Andrew is traditionally portrayed with a long forked beard, a cross, and a book;
- Masaccio's 1426 "Saint Andrew" is a panel painting in tempora and gold leaf, once part of the Pisa Altarpiece It is now at the Getty Center in Los Angeles, California.
- Andrew appears as part of Carlo Crivelli's San Domenico Altarpiece (1476). This panel is now in the National Gallery in London;
- Hans Holbein the Younger did a pen and ink drawing (c. 1519) of the saint as a design for a stained glass window. It is in the Kunstmuseum Basel.
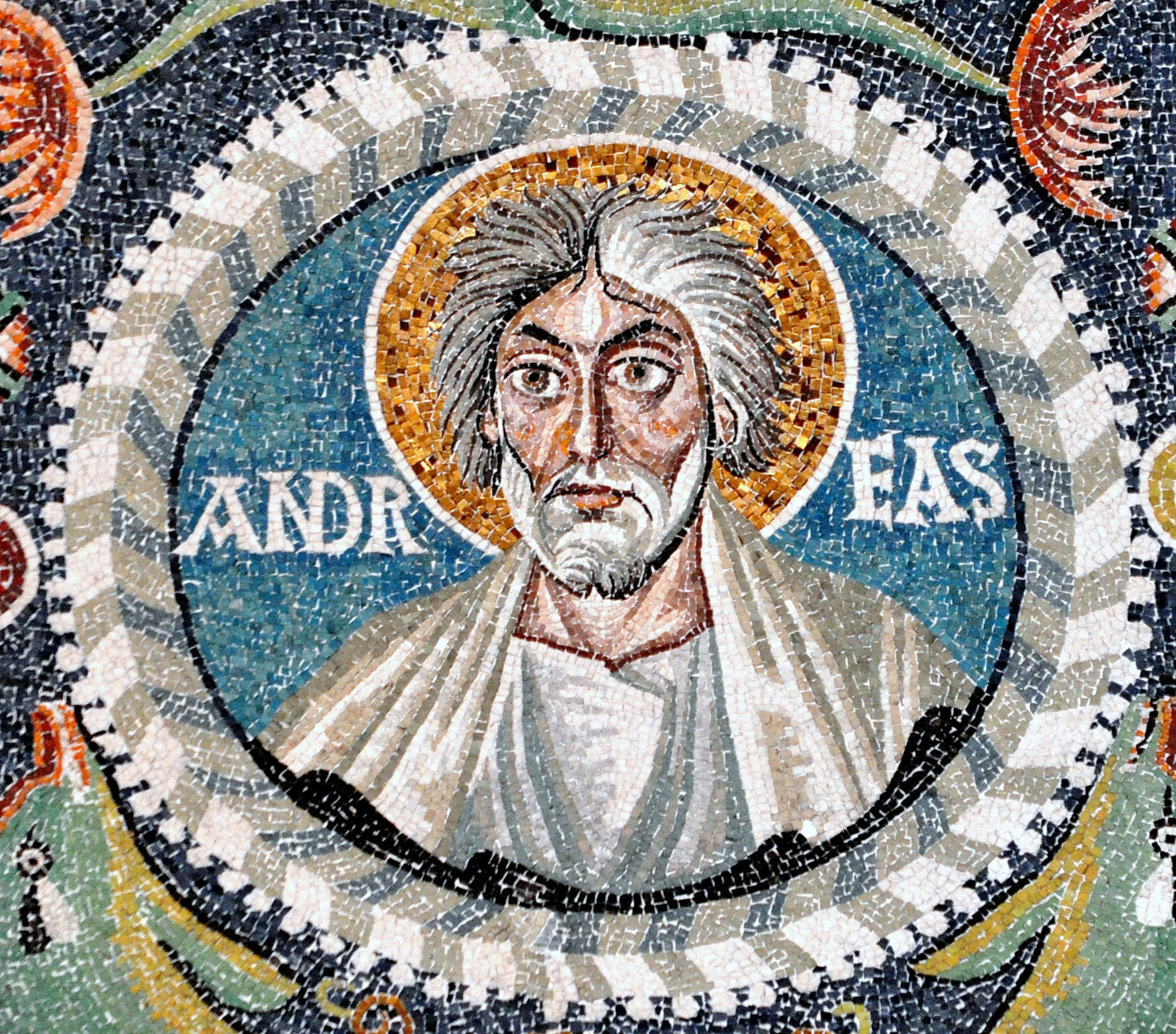
Andrew the Apostle, detail of the mosaic in the Basilica of San Vitale, Ravenna, 6th century

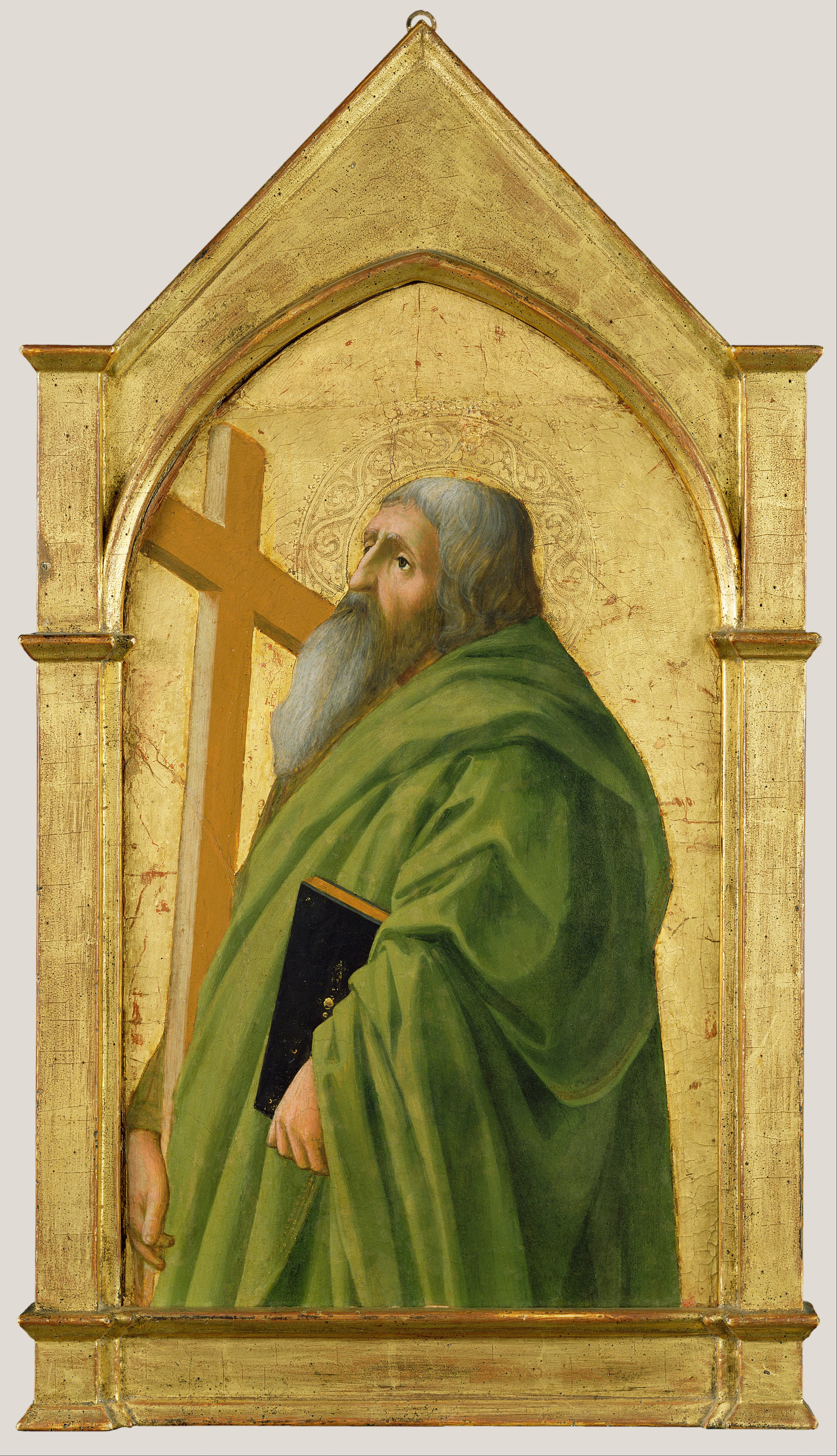
Saint Andrew, Masaccio (1426)

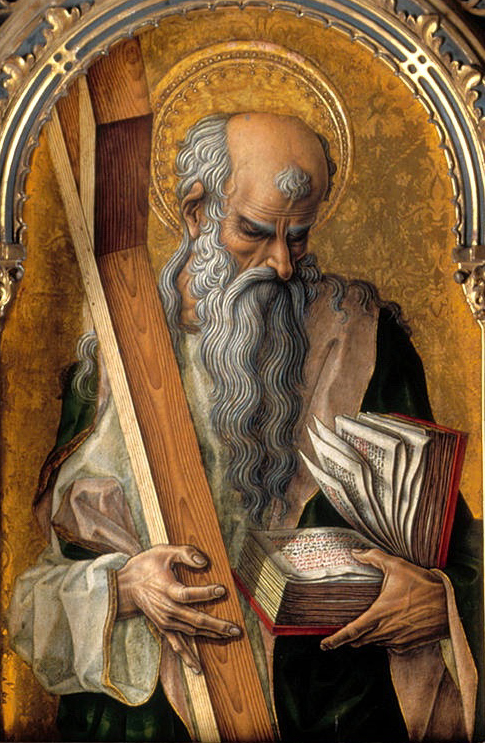
Polittico del 1476, S. Andrea

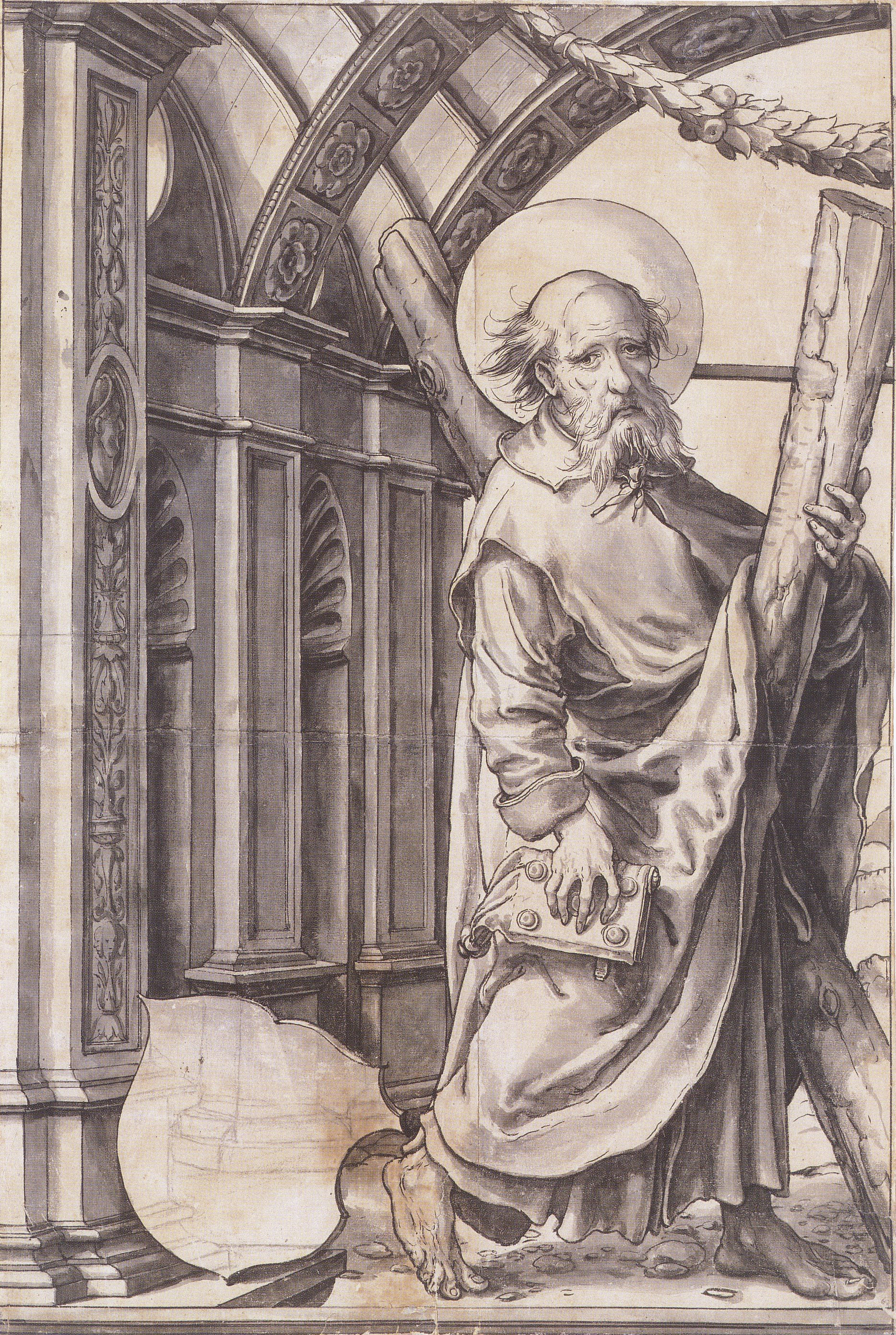
St Andrew, Design for a Stained Glass Window, by Hans Holbein the Younger (c. 1519)

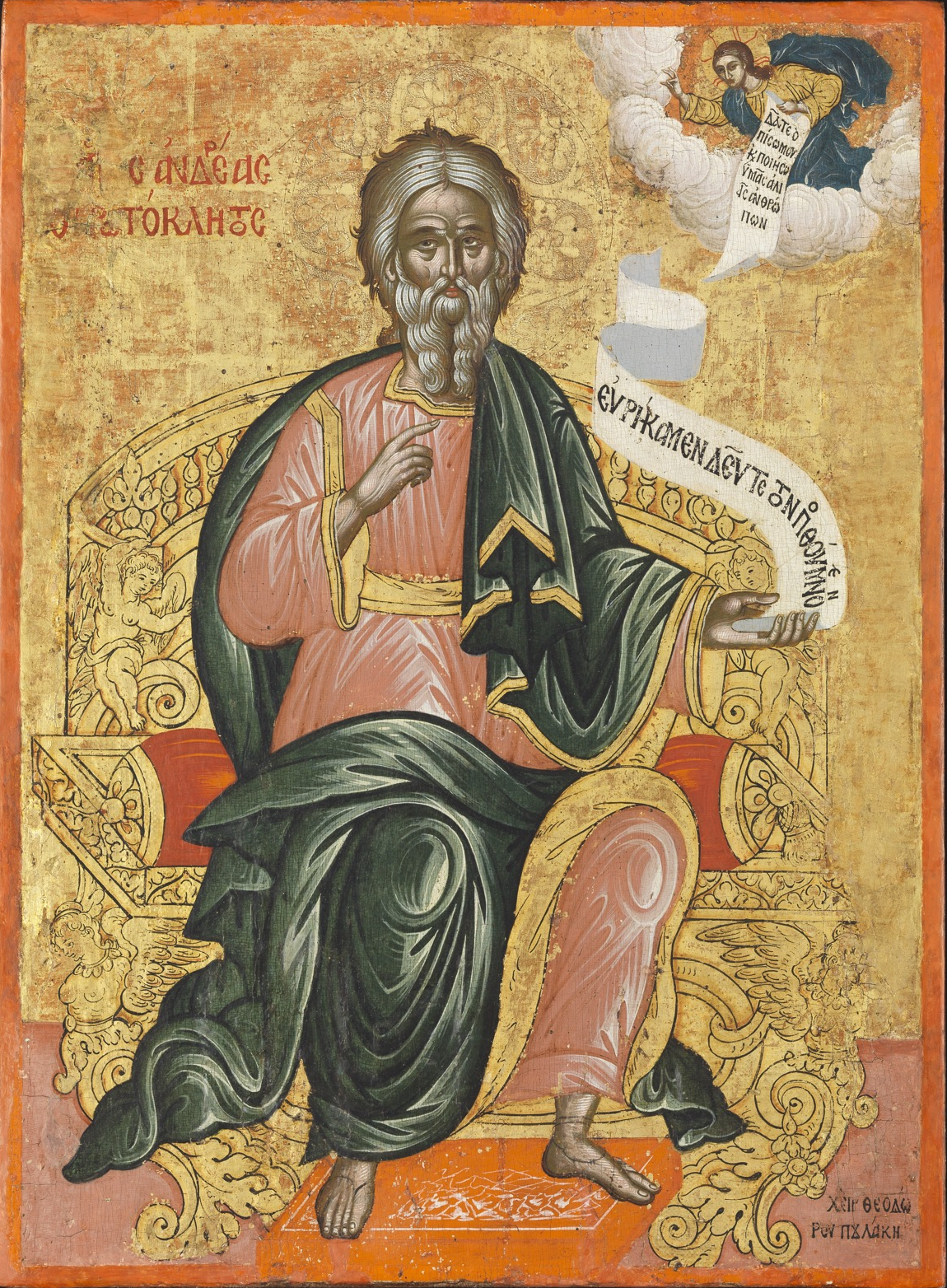
Icon by Theodore Poulakis, 1640–1692

== See also ==
- The Martyrdom of Saint Andrew (disambiguation)
- Order of Saint Andrew
- Patron saints of places
- Saltire – the X-shaped cross in heraldry and vexillology
- St. Andrew's Cross (disambiguation)
- Saint Andrew's Day
- University of St Andrews — named after the Royal Burgh of St Andrews, which was named after the saint
- Saint Andrew the Apostle, patron saint archive
- Monument to Andrew the Apostle

== Bibliography ==
- Attwater, Donald and Catherine Rachel John; The Penguin Dictionary of Saints, 3rd edition, New York, Penguin Books, 1993 ISBN 0-14-051312-4
- Calvert, Judith (1984). "The Iconography of the St. Andrew Auckland Cross". The Art Bulletin. 66 (4): 543–555. doi:10.1080/00043079.1984.10788208. ISSN 0004-3079.
- Denoël, Charlotte (2004). Saint André: culte et iconographie en France, Ve – XVe siècles. École Nationale des Chartes. ISBN 978-2-900791-73-8.
- Dvornik, Francis (1958). The Idea of Apostolicity in Byzantium and the Legend of the Apostle Andrew. Harvard University Press. ISBN 978-0-88402-004-2.
- Djobadze, Wachtang Z. (1976). "Materials for the Study of Georgian Monasteries in the Western Environs of Antioch on the Orontes". Corpus Scriptorum Christianorum Orientalium. 372, subsidia 48. Louvain: 82–83.
- Fennell, John (14 January 2014). A History of the Russian Church to 1488. Routledge. ISBN 978-1-317-89720-0.
- Ferguson, Everett (2013). Encyclopedia of Early Christianity - Second Edition. Routledge. ISBN 978-1-136-61158-2.
- MacRory, Joseph (1907). "St. Andrew (1)". In Herbermann, Charles (ed.). Catholic Encyclopedia. Vol. 1. New York: Robert Appleton Company.
- Metzger, Bruce M.; Coogan, Michael D. (1993). The Oxford Companion to the Bible. Oxford: Oxford University Press. ISBN 0-19-504645-5.
- Noegel, Scott B.; Wheeler, Brandon M. (2002). Historical Dictionary of Prophets in Islam and Judaism. Lanham, MD: Scarecrow. ISBN 978-0-8108-4305-9.
- Parker Lawson, John (1848). History of the Abbey and Palace of Holyroodhouse. H. Courtoy.
- Peterson, Peter M. (1958). Andrew, brother of Simon Peter – His history and legends. Leiden: Brill Publishers. ISBN 978-90-04-26579-0.
- Shevzov, Vera (2012). Casiday, Augustine (ed.). The Orthodox Christian World. Routledge. pp. 15–40. ISBN 978-0-415-45516-9.
- Rapp, Stephen H. (2003). Studies in Medieval Georgian Historiography - Early Texts and Eurasian Contexts. Peeters Publishers. ISBN 978-90-429-1318-9.
- Réau, Louis (1958). Iconographie de l'art chrétien [Iconography of Christian Art] (in French). Vol. III.1. Paris: Presses Universitaires de France.
- Stan, Lavinia; Turcescu, Lucian (2007). Religion and Politics in Post-Communist Romania. Oxford University Press. ISBN 978-0-19-804217-4.
- Thuis, Hans (2015). Nestorkroniek - De oudste geschiedenis van het Kievse Rijk (in Dutch). Nijmegen: Uitgeverij Vantilt. p. 304. ISBN 978-94-6004-228-7.
- Williams, Nicola; Maxwell, Virginia (2018). Florence and Tuscany. Lonely Planet. ISBN 978-1-78701-193-9.

Titles of the Great Christian Church
Preceded by Founder	Bishop of Byzantium; 36–38	Succeeded by Stachys the Apostle
