= One hundred thousand lei (Romanian coin) =

- Romania
- Value: 100,000 Romanian leu
- Mass: 25.0 g
- Diameter: 37.00 mm
- Edge: Plain, inscribed NIHIL * SINE * DEO * (Latin:Nothing without God)
- Composition: 70% silver, 30% copper
- Years of minting: 1946

Obverse
- Design: Portrait of King Michael I of Romania and year
- Designer: H. Ionescu
- Design date: 1946

Reverse
- Design: A dove handing an olive branch to a woman; country name, denomination and coat of arms
- Designer: A Romanescu
- Design date: 1946

The one hundred thousand lei was the largest-denomination coin ever issued in Romania. It was minted only in 1946, to mark the end of World War II the previous year.

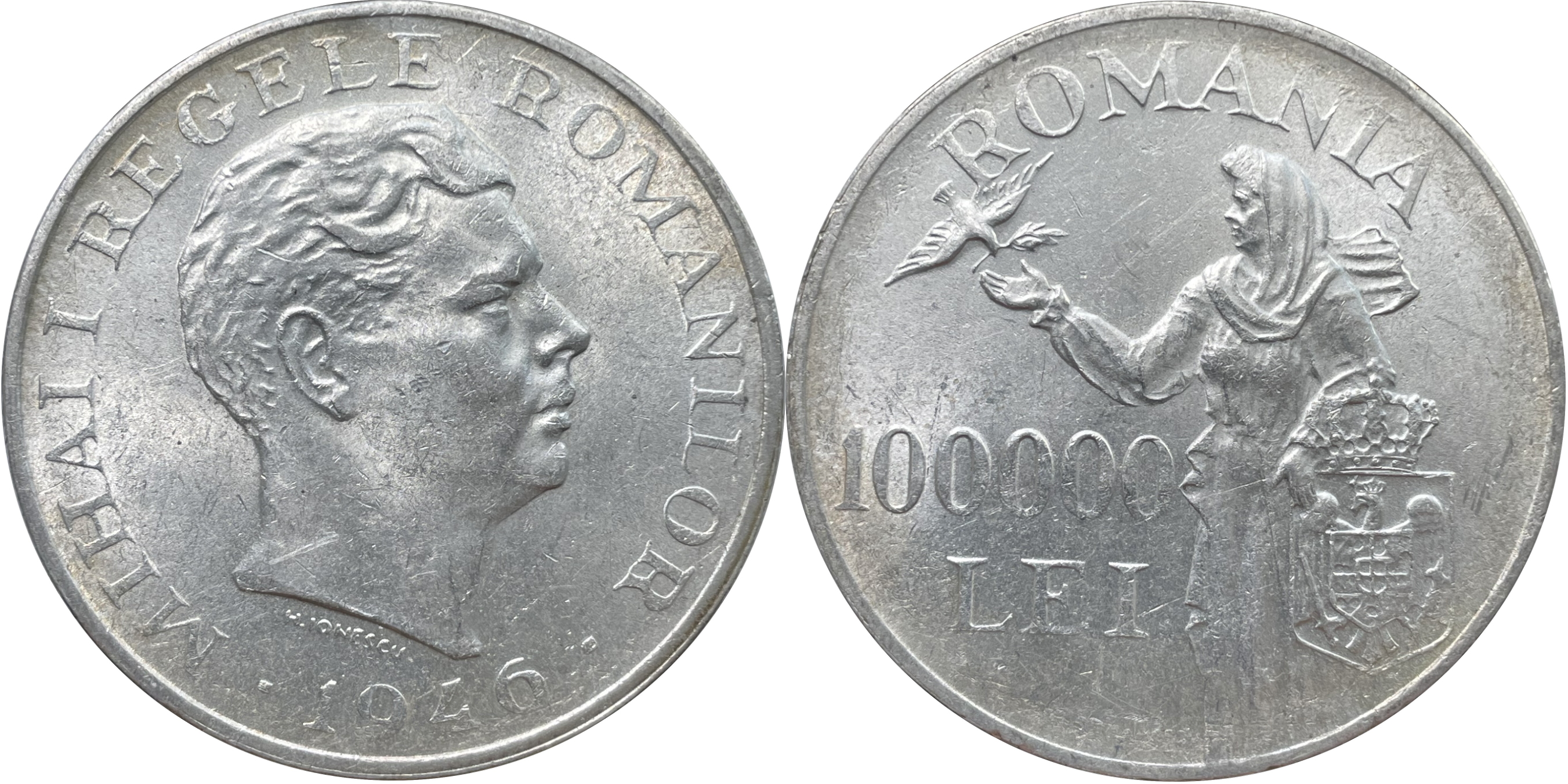
100.000 lei coin from 1946

It was made of 70% silver and 30% copper. The obverse featured a portrait of King Michael I of Romania with the inscription MIHAI I REGELE ROMÂNILOR (Michael I King of Romanians). The portrait was done by an H. Ionescu, whose name was marked below. On the reverse, a dove bearing an olive branch was pictured bringing the branch to a woman. On the bottom right of the reverse was the coat of arms of the Kingdom of Romania. The sculptor's name, A. Romanescu, was placed in the bottom right.

The coin had a mintage of 2.002 million from the Bucharest Mint. There are anomalies from specimen to specimen concerning the written inscription on the edge, with it starting from different points. In addition, writing can face the obverse or reverse on different coins. There are also editions without the name of A. Romanescu on its reverse. Counterfeit versions of the coin were also produced on materials of a lower value than silver and thus weigh 18.36 g instead of 25. However, the counterfeits were produced within the mint, a practice which had been frequent in Romania since the end of the First World War.

The denomination was made obsolete on 15 August 1947 after a monetary reform which redenominated 20,000 old lei to one new leu, thus giving a new value of five lei.
