= Mottos of Romanian institutions =

Institutional mottos

Romania has no official motto. Between the years 1859 and 1866 there were several mottos placed on the several coats of arms of the country (like Toți în unu – "All in one"). From 1866 (when the prince Carol I became sovereign of Romania) until 1947 (when the Kingdom was abolished by force by the communists), the official motto was that of the House of Hohenzollern-Sigmaringen: Nihil Sine Deo ("Nothing Without God" in Latin). During the communist regime the country had no motto.

== Romanian institutions and their mottos ==
- Ministry of Foreign Affairs: Semper Fidelis Patriae ("Always Loyal to the Fatherland")
- Ministry of National Defense: Honor et Patria or Onoare şi Patrie ("Honor and Fatherland")
- Ministry of Interior and Administrative Reform: Pro Patria et Ordine Iuris ("For the Fatherland and the Rule of Law")
  - The Romanian Police: Lex et Honor ("Law and Honor")
  - The Romanian Inspectorate for Emergency Situations: Audacia et Devotio ("Courage and Devotion")
  - The Romanian Border Police: Patria et Honor ("Fatherland and Honor")
  - The Romanian Gendarmerie: Lex et Ordo or Lege si Ordine ("Law and Order")
- Ministry of Justice: Justitia Est Fundamentum Regnorum ("Justice is Fundamental to Reign")
- The Protection Service: Semper Fidelis ("Always Faithful")

== Other mottos ==
- Order of the Star of Romania: In Fide Salus

== See also ==
- The coats of arms of the respective institutions
