= Riagail =

Irish monk (fl. 573–600)

Riagail, aka Regulus, Irish monk, fl. 573–600.

Riagail was an Irish monk expelled from Ireland with Columba.

== See also ==
- Riagail of Bangor, died 881.
