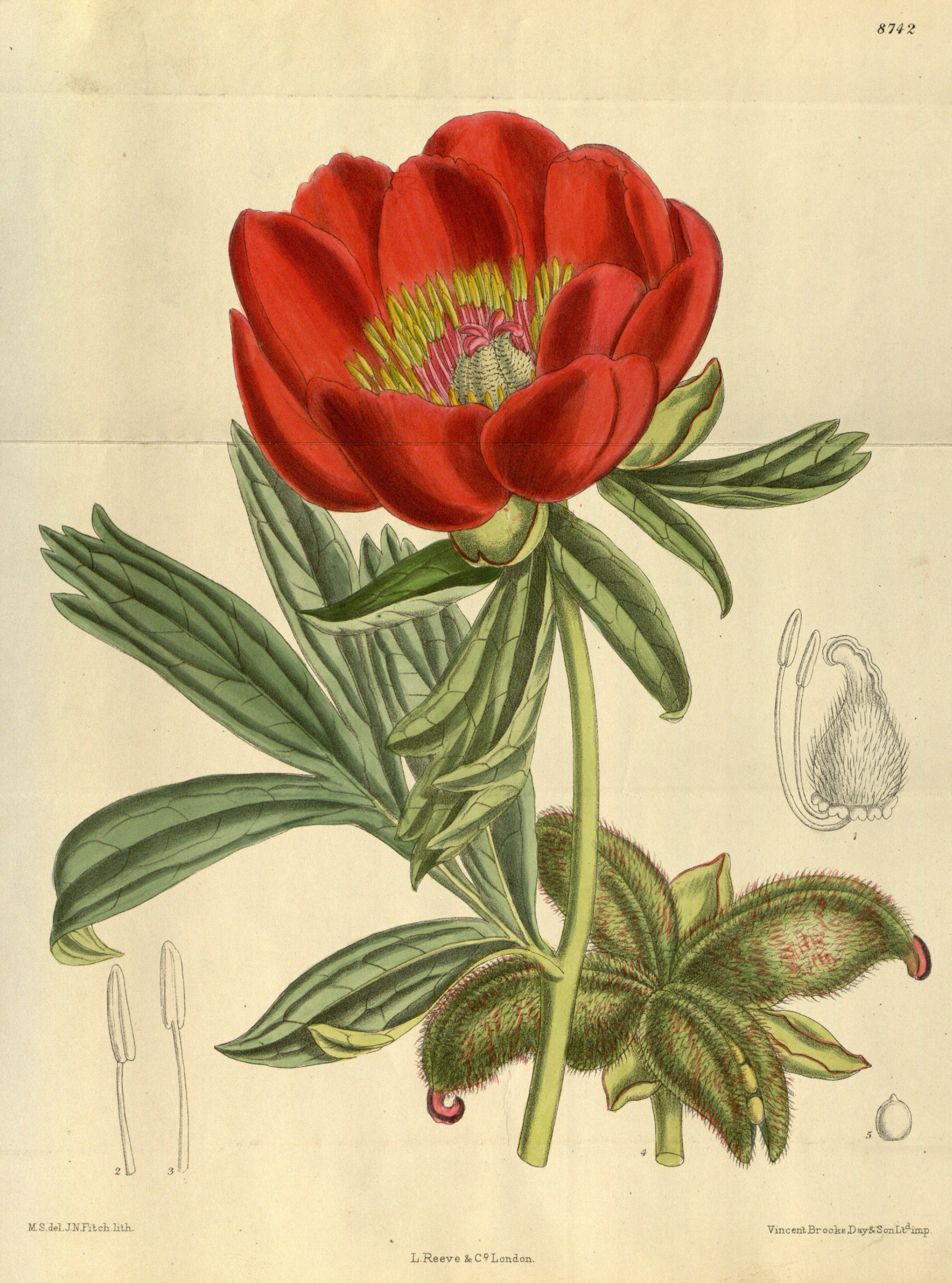
- P. peregrina, Curtis's Botanical Magazine, vol.144

Scientific classification
- Kingdom: Plantae
- Clade: Tracheophytes
- Clade: Angiosperms
- Clade: Eudicots
- Order: Saxifragales
- Family: Paeoniaceae
- Genus: Paeonia
- Species: P. peregrina

Binomial name
- Paeonia peregrina Mill.

= Paeonia peregrina =

Species of flowering plant

Paeonia peregrina is a species of flowering plant in the peony family Paeoniaceae, native to Southeastern Europe and Turkey. It is an erect, herbaceous perennial with 9-lobed, deeply divided leaves. Single, glossy red flowers, 10–13 cm (4–5 in) in diameter, with prominent yellow stamens, are borne in spring (May in the Northern Hemisphere).

== Etymology ==
Peregrina, comes from the Latin peregrīnus (foreigner), from peregrē (to be abroad). Paeonia, comes from Ancient Greek: paiōnía (παιωνία), related to paiṓnios (healing) and paiôn (physician), as Paiā́npaean. According to Homer, Paean was the physician of the Olympian gods, considered by Hesiod as an individual deity who "knows the remedies for all things". After the period of Homer and Hesiod, the word Paean become an epithet of Apollo and later of Asclepius, son of Apollo, the god-healer.

== Distribution and habitat ==
Paeonia peregrina is a Balkan species native to south-eastern Europe, distributed from Italy, Albania, Greece, Macedonia, Serbia, Bulgaria, Romania to Turkey (Anatolia) and Moldova.

It is a common species found in arid, rocky areas, at the edge of forests or meadows and, less commonly, in grasses. It is usually found in the shade of broad-leaved deciduous forests, pine forests or mixed forests.

== Culture ==
=== Romania ===
Known as the Romanian peony in Romania ("bujorul românesc"), the Paeonia peregrina is commonly present in the traditional culture and Romanian folklore, with an impressive variety of symbols mentioned in history, music, poetry, literature, painting, design and architecture.

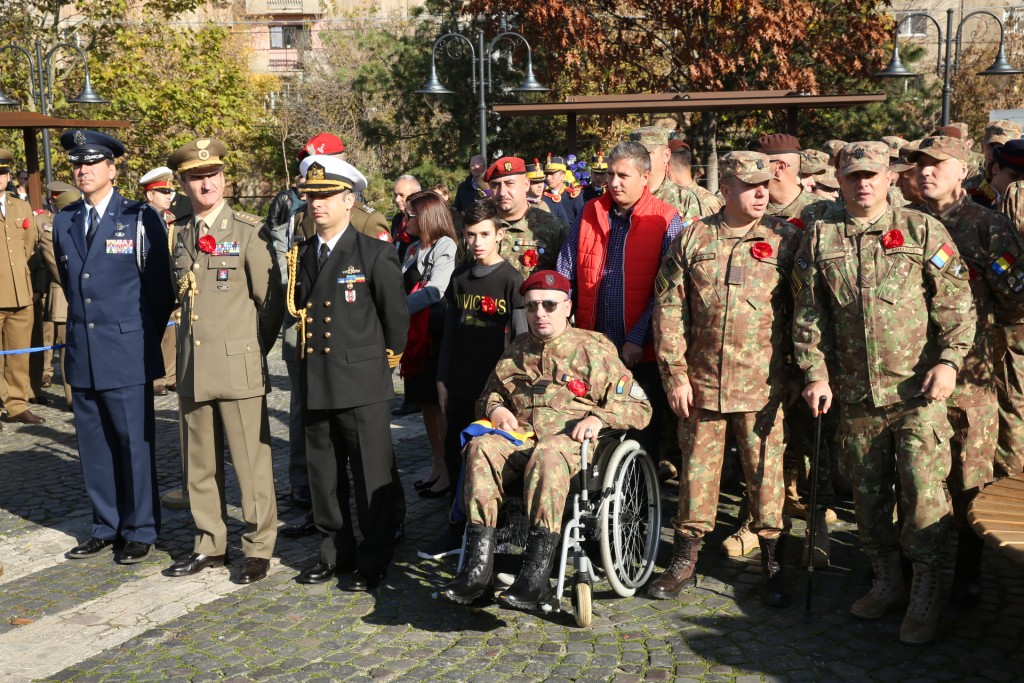
The Romanian peony worn on Veterans' Day on 11 November 2019

The flowers are also found as traditional motifs in folk costumes, traditional carpets, pottery and decorative arts. The Romanian peony is also associated with physical and spiritual beauty, as well as innocence, happiness and shyness (as expressed in "îmbujorare" - blushing). In many parts of the country, a beautiful young girl is said to be a "bujor de fată" ("girl peony"), while the redness in the cheeks denoting health and vitality is traditionally referred to as "bujori în obraji" ("peonies in the cheeks"). Handsome men are also associated with peonies in the saying "frumos ca un bujor" ("handsome as a peony"). In Romanian folk medicine, the peony has been valued as a plant with therapeutic properties. The name "Bujor" and its derivatives is also common as surnames, first names, town names, and street names.

Starting during the reign of King Carol I, the idea of choosing a national flower was proposed. The Paeonia peregrina was among the proposals, however none were ever accepted to be formally legislated. The project proposing the peony as the national flower was reactivated in June 2013 headed by professor Florin Toma of the University of Agronomic Sciences and Veterinary Medicine of Bucharest. Since its launch, the initiative enjoyed strong support, both nationally and internationally.

On 27 September 2022, the peony was declared the "National Flower of Romania". Since 2015, the red peony is also used as the floral symbol of Veterans' Day, similar to the remembrance poppy, on 11 November and on 29 April. The Romanian peony day is celebrated on 15 May.

=== Serbia and Kosovo ===
The Paeonia peregrina is important in Serbian folklore. Known as Kosovo peonies (Serbian: косовски божур, kosovski božur), they are said to represent the blood of Serbian warriors who died in the Battle of Kosovo.

== Gallery ==
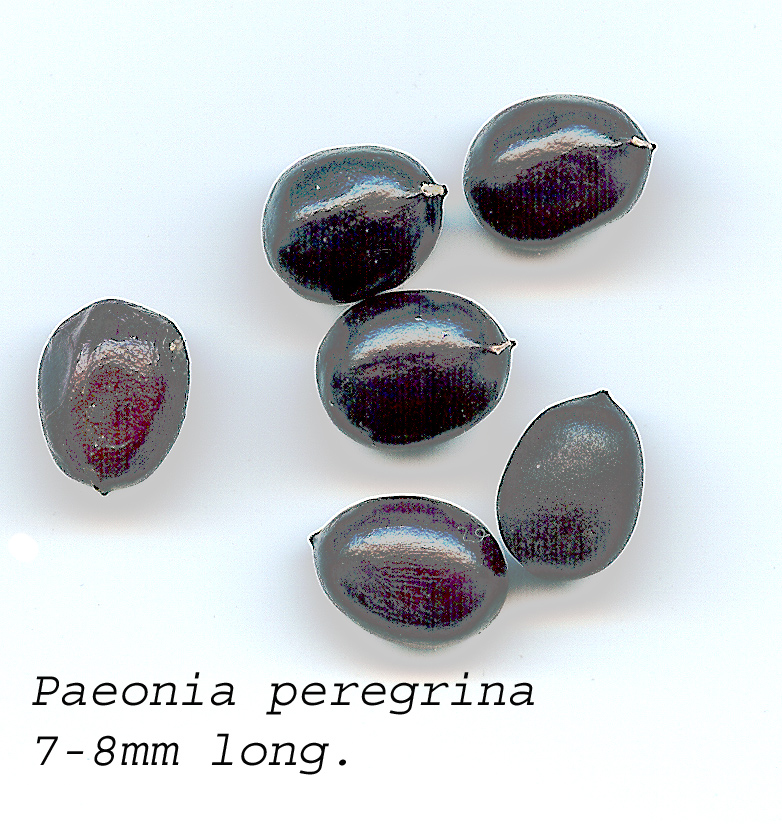
Seeds

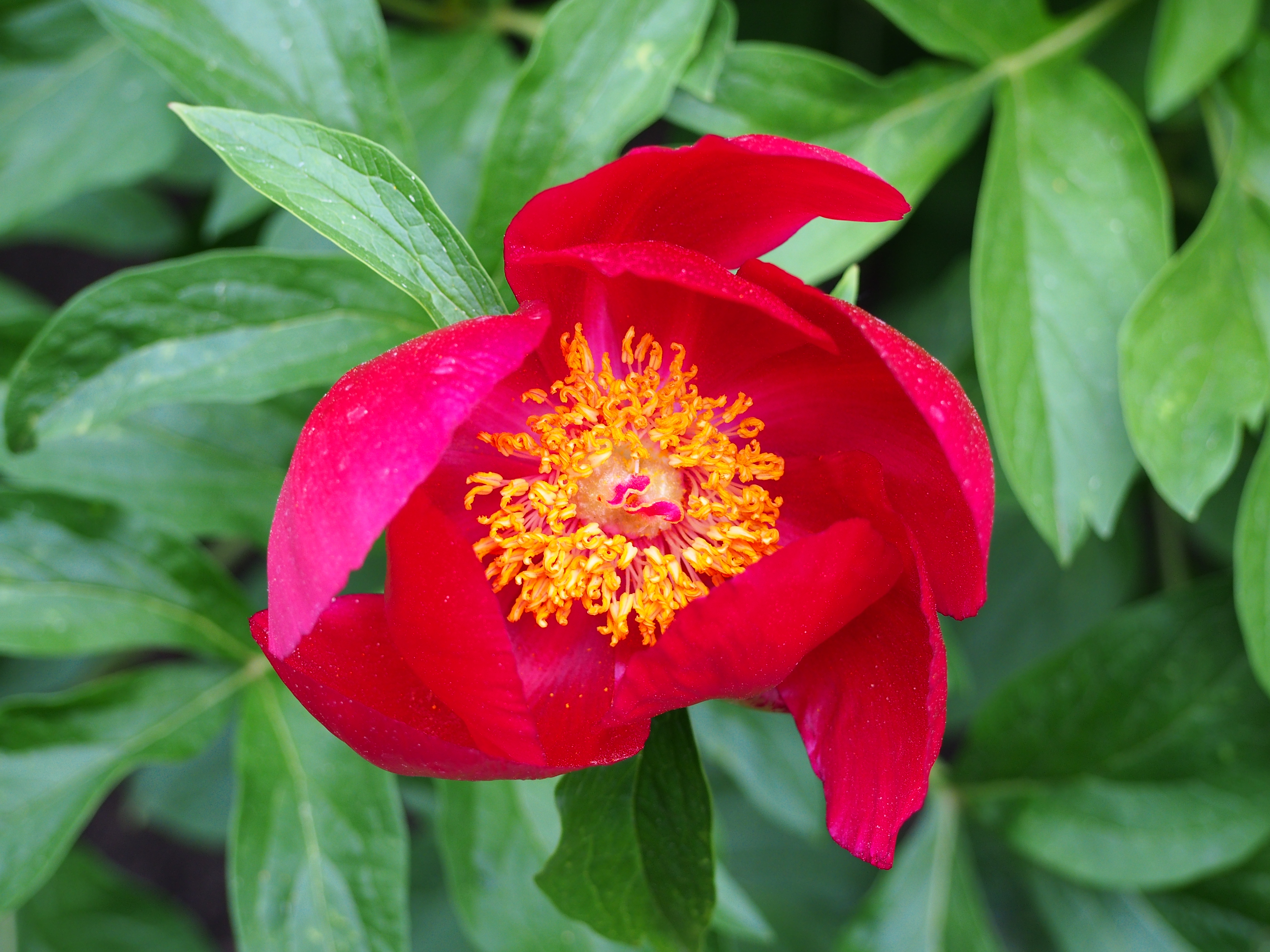
Flower

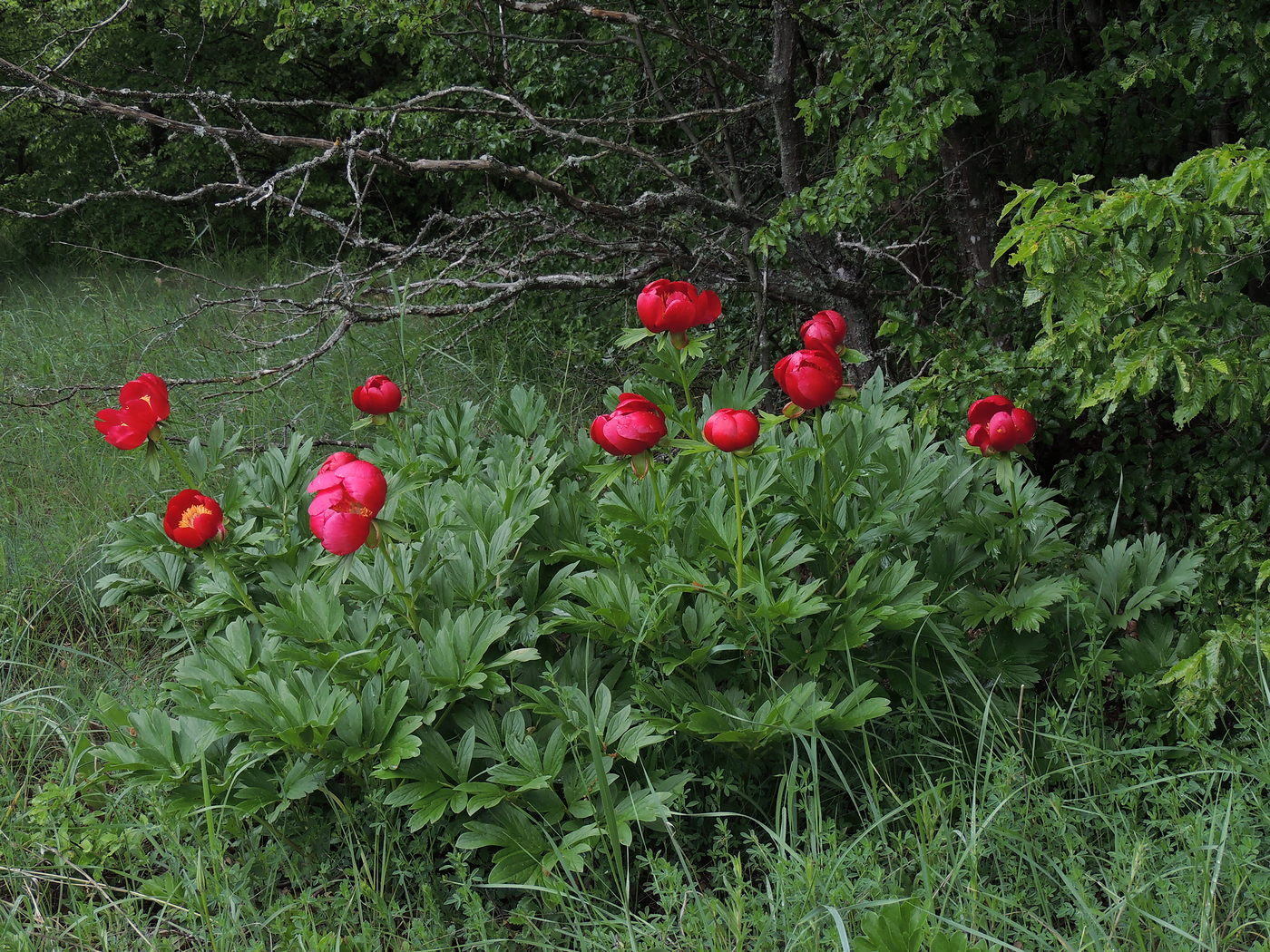
Mature plant

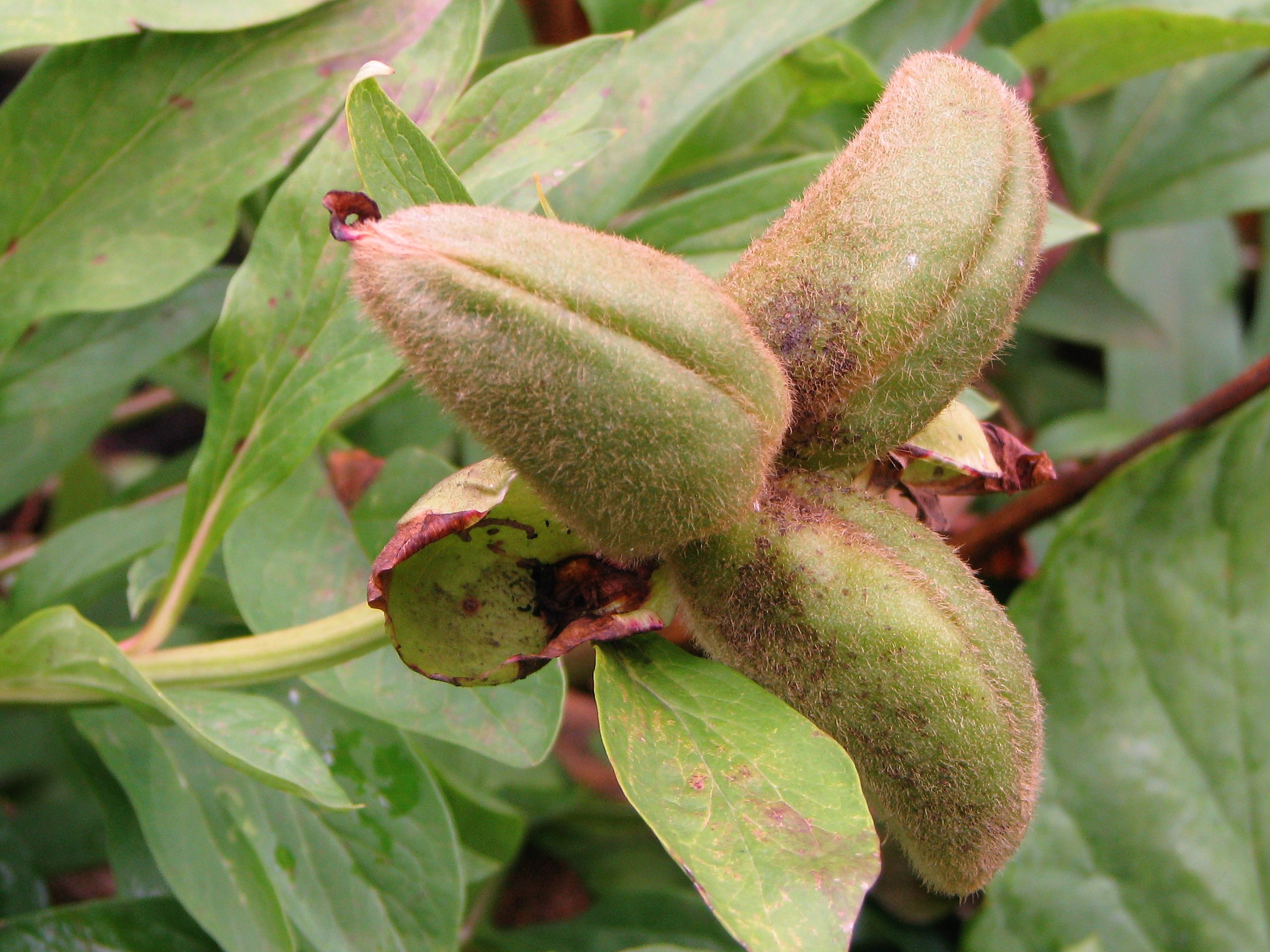
Fruits

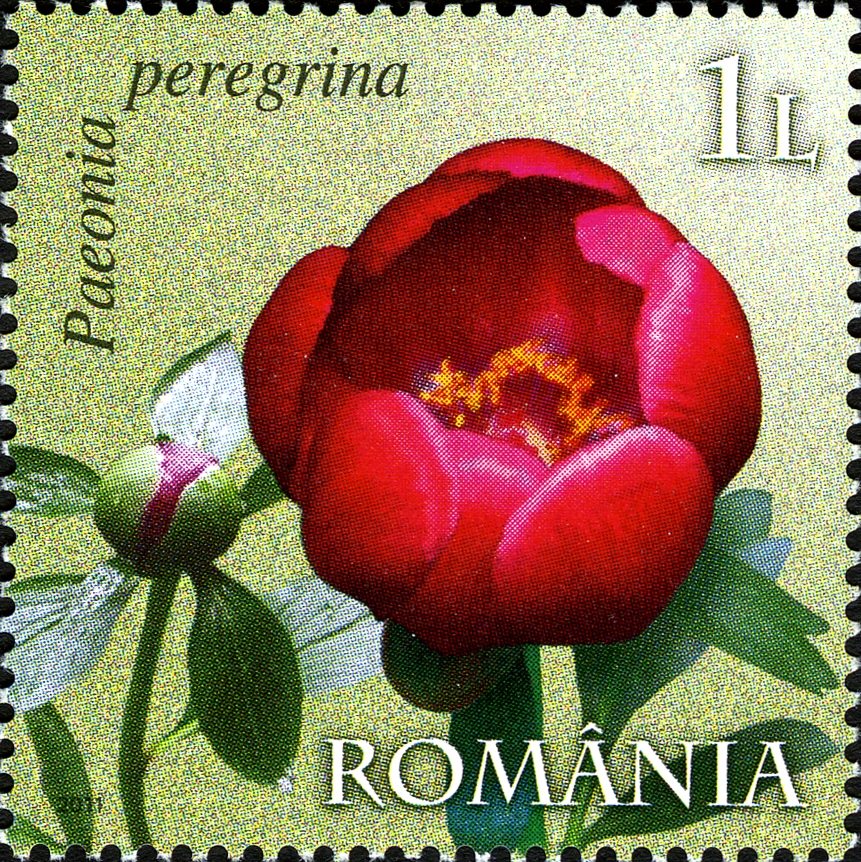
Paeonia peregrina on a Romanian stamp
