= Pobladura de Pelayo García =

Coordinates: 42°18′N 5°41′W

Pobladura de Pelayo García, Spain
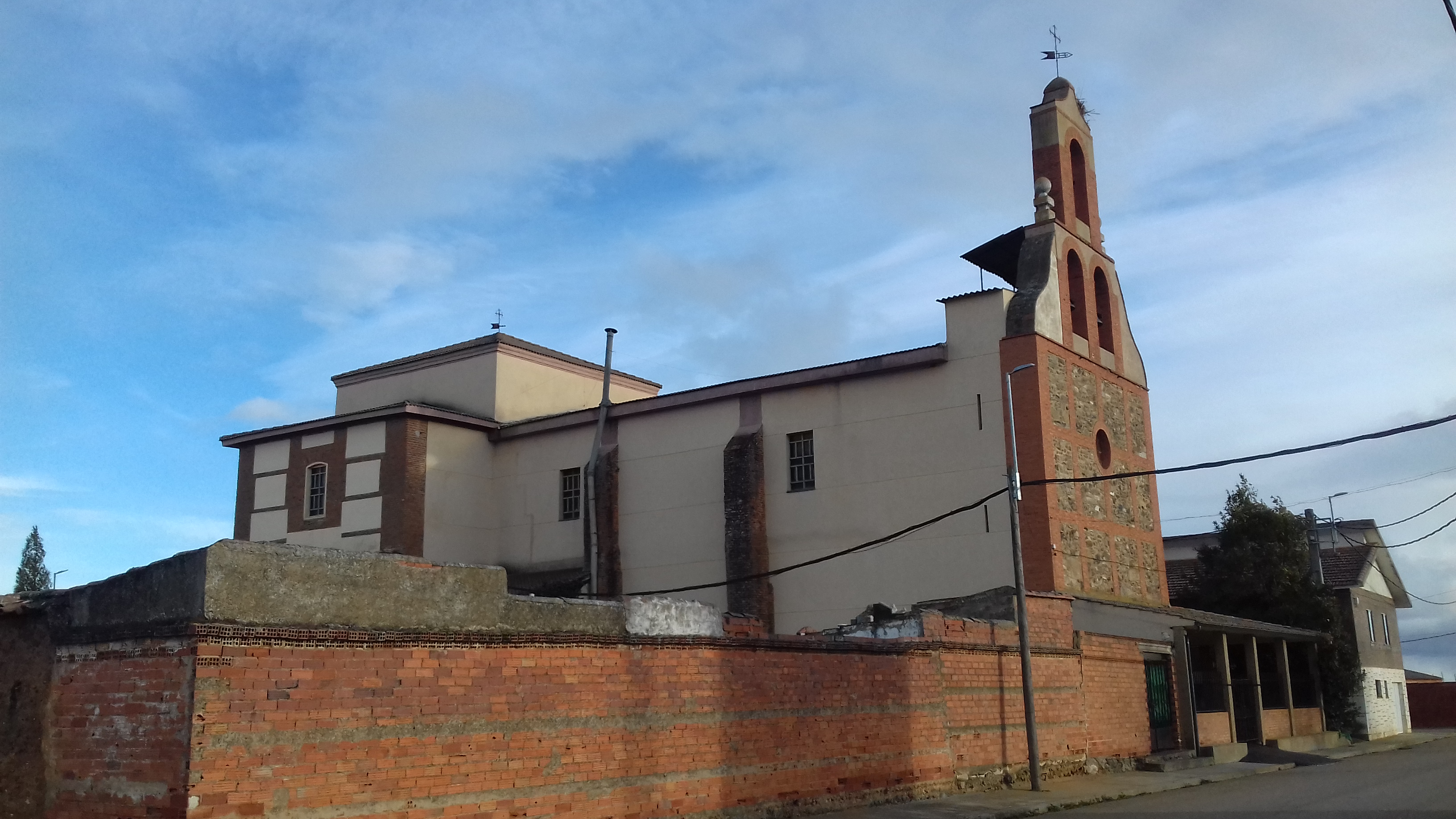
- Church of Pobladura de Pelayo García

- Flag Coat of arms
- Interactive map of Pobladura de Pelayo García, Spain
- Country: Spain
- Autonomous community: Castile and León
- Province: León
- Municipality: Pobladura de Pelayo García

Area
  - Total: 20.17 km^{2} (7.79 sq mi)
- Elevation: 800 m (2,600 ft)

Population (2025-01-01)
  - Total: 364
  - Density: 18.0/km^{2} (46.7/sq mi)
- Time zone: UTC+1 (CET)
  - Summer (DST): UTC+2 (CEST)

Pobladura de Pelayo García is a municipality located in the province of León, Castile and León, Spain. According to the 2005 census (INE), the municipality had a population of 521 inhabitants.
