= Saint Andrew in Romania =

Legend in Romania

Church of Saint Andrew in the Burdujeni neighborhood of Suceava (completed 1997)

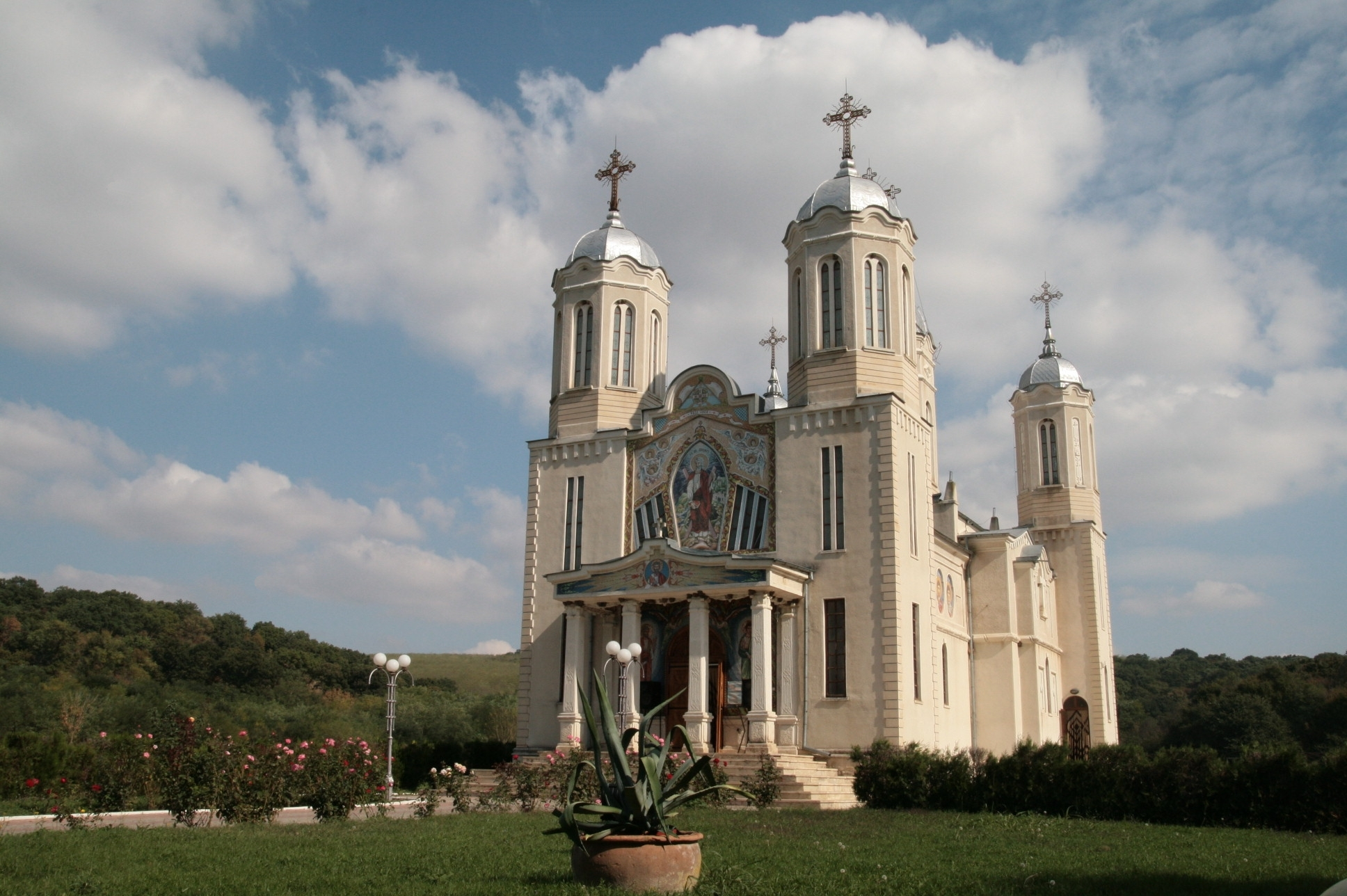
Church of Saint Andrew in Ion Corvin, Constanța (completed 2002)

The legend of Saint Andrew in Romania tells that today's territory of Romania was Christianized by Saint Andrew in the 1st century AD. While these claims lack any historical and archeological evidence, the legend has been embraced as fact by both the Romanian Orthodox Church and the Romanian state, both during Ceaușescu's protochronism period and after 1989, when Saint Andrew was named the patron saint of Romania.

The legend is recent and based on references by 3rd century writer Hippolytus of Rome in "On Apostles", mentioning Saint Andrew's voyage to Scythia and on works by several authors which also mention the voyage, such as: Eusebius in the Chronicles of Eusebius, Origen in the third book of his Commentaries on the Genesis (254 C.E.), Usuard in his Martyrdom written between 845-865, and Jacobus de Voragine in the Golden Legend (c. 1260). Scythia generally refers to a land in what is now Romania (Scythia Minor), Ukraine and southern Russia.

== The Story ==
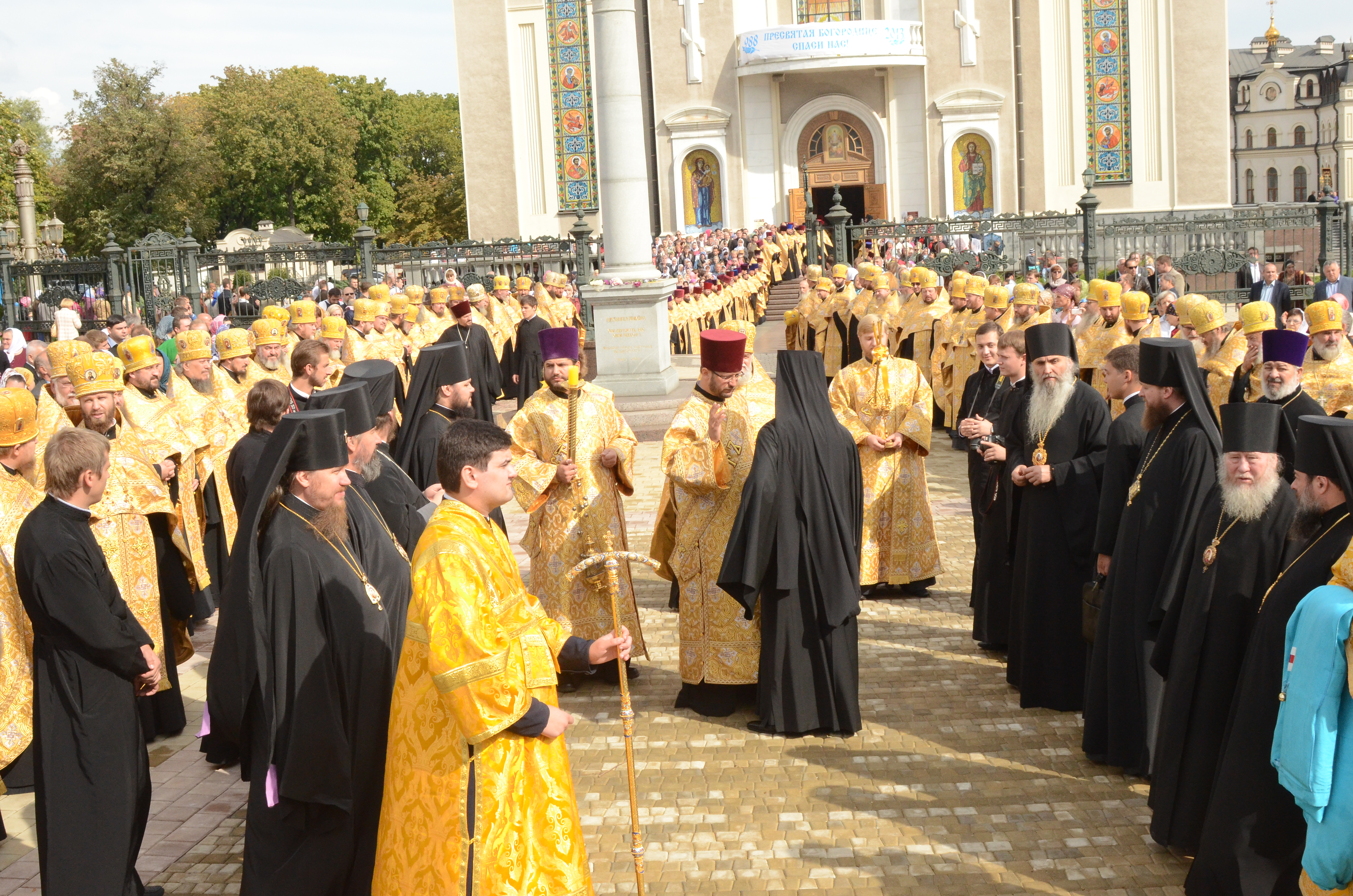
The consecration of the monument in Donetsk after St. Andrew

Historian Alexandru Barnea states that a tale started to circulate in the first half of the 20th century. It tells of Saint Andrew's arrival in Dobruja during a harsh winter, fighting wild beasts and the blizzard before reaching a cave. At the cave, Saint Andrew hit the ground with his walking stick and a spring came into being, in the waters of which he baptized the locals and cured the ill, thus converting the whole area to Christianity. This tale seems to be heavily based on the Chronicles of Eusebius.

According to some modern Romanian scholars, the idea of early Christianisation is unsustainable. They take the idea to be a part of an ideology of protochronism which purports that the Orthodox Church has been a companion and defender of the Romanian people for its entire history, which was then used for propaganda purposes during the communist era.

== Saint Andrew's Cave ==
According to Hippolyte of Antioch, (died c. 250 C.E.) in his On Apostles, Origen, in the third book of his Commentaries on the Genesis (254 C.E.), Eusebius of Caesarea in his Church History (340 C.E.), and other sources, like the Usuard's Martyrdom written between 845-865, and Jacobus de Voragine in Golden Legend (c. 1260), Saint Andrew preached in Scythia Minor. St. Philip may have also preached in the area. In Dobruja, a cave where he supposedly preached, is called "Saint Andrew's Cave" and advertised as a pilgrimage site.

In 1940, Ion Dinu, a lawyer, found a cave in Ion Corvin, Constanța and spread the word that Saint Andrew lived in the cave. According to Dinu, this revelation came to him within a dream. In 1943, the cave was consecrated and soon a monastery was built around it, named the "Saint Andre the Apostle Cave Monastery". The monks tell that early Christian objects were found in the cave, but they were lost in the meantime.

Nevertheless, historians and archeologists say that the claims about Saint Andrew's Cave are false and that early Christianity was spread by preachers in the cities, not in rural areas, caves and forests.

According to Radu Cinpoes, there is no clear evidence concerning missionary work on the part of St. Andrew near Dobruja.

== Patron saint of Romania ==
In 1994, Saint Andrew was named the patron saint of Dobruja, in 1997 the patron saint of Romania, then in 2012, 30 November became a public holiday.
