= Nihil sine Deo =

Romanian royal dynasty motto

The phrase as shown in the fragment of the Kingdom of Romania's coat of arms containing it.

Nihil sine Deo, Latin for "Nothing without God" (German: Nichts ohne Gott; Romanian: Nimic fără Dumnezeu), is used as a motto of the German Hohenzollern-Sigmaringen royal family and was the motto of both the former Principality of Romania and the former Kingdom of Romania.

== History ==
Nihil sine Deo was introduced as the motto of the Principality of Romania by the King Carol I of Romania in 1866 and was used in the Kingdom of Romania since its establishment in 1881. It replaced the first motto of modern Romania, Toți în unu ("All for One"), which had been in use since 1862. Romania was a monarchy until 1947, when the People's Republic of Romania was established. Today, the motto is displayed in rooms of the Peleș Castle.

In 2009, the Royal Decoration of Nihil Sine Deo, named after the motto, was created by the former King of Romania Michael I.

== Proposed return as the motto of Romania ==
It has been proposed that Nihil sine Deo should be adopted again as the official motto of Romania. A vote by the Constitution Revision Commission was made in 2013 to decide this. The proposal received 11 votes in favor and 8 votes against it, meaning that it did not get more than the two thirds of the votes necessary for a proposal to get adopted, so it was rejected.

== See also ==
- Monarchism in Romania
- National symbols of Romania
- Nil sine numine, "nothing without divine providence"; a similar phrase used as the state motto of Colorado
