= 1601 in art =

Events from the year 1601 in art.

== Events ==
- July – Nicholas Hilliard writes to Robert Cecil, England's Secretary of State, acknowledging an annuity of £40, and asking permission to retire from London to save on household expenses.

== Paintings ==
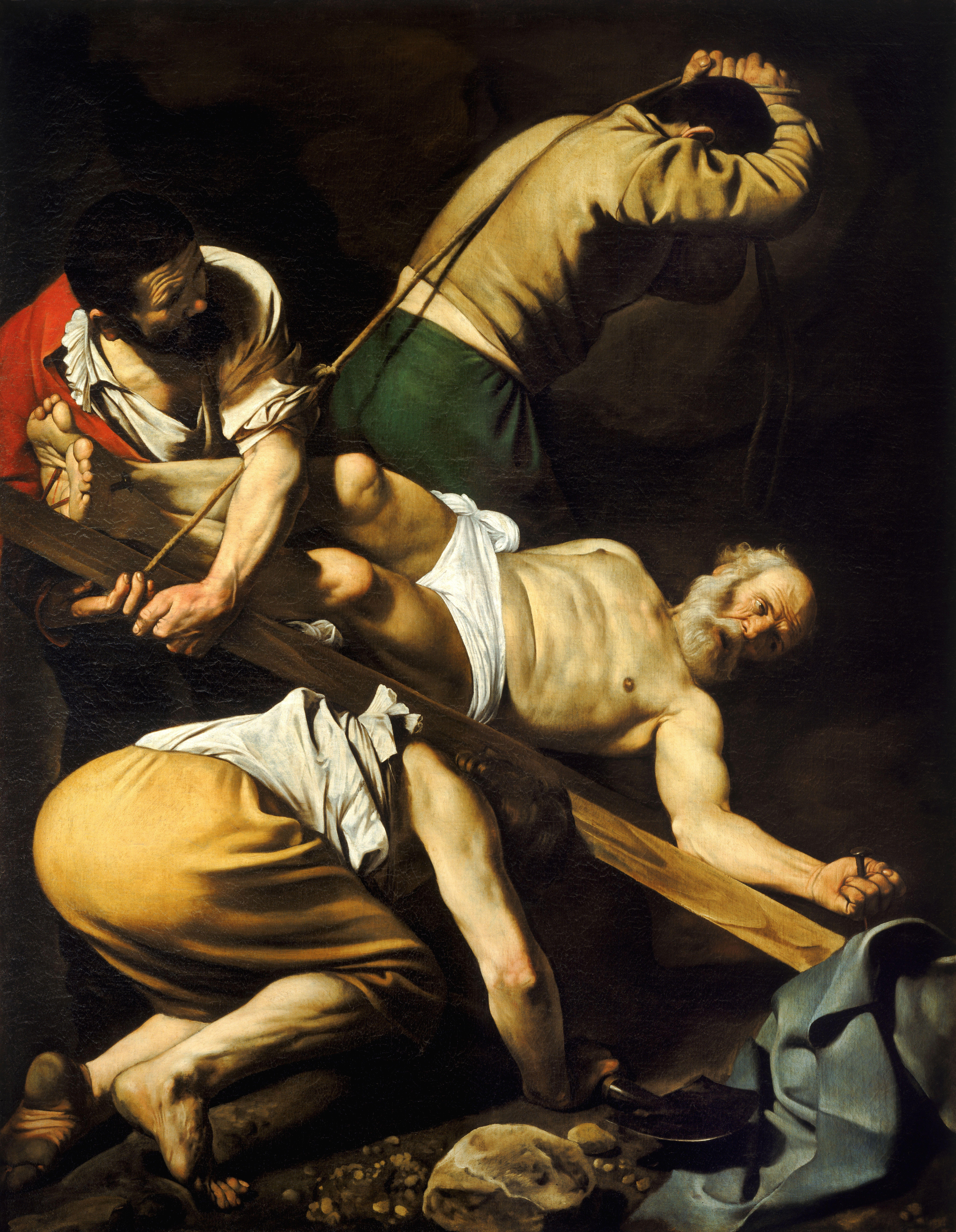
Caravaggio, Crucifixion of St. Peter

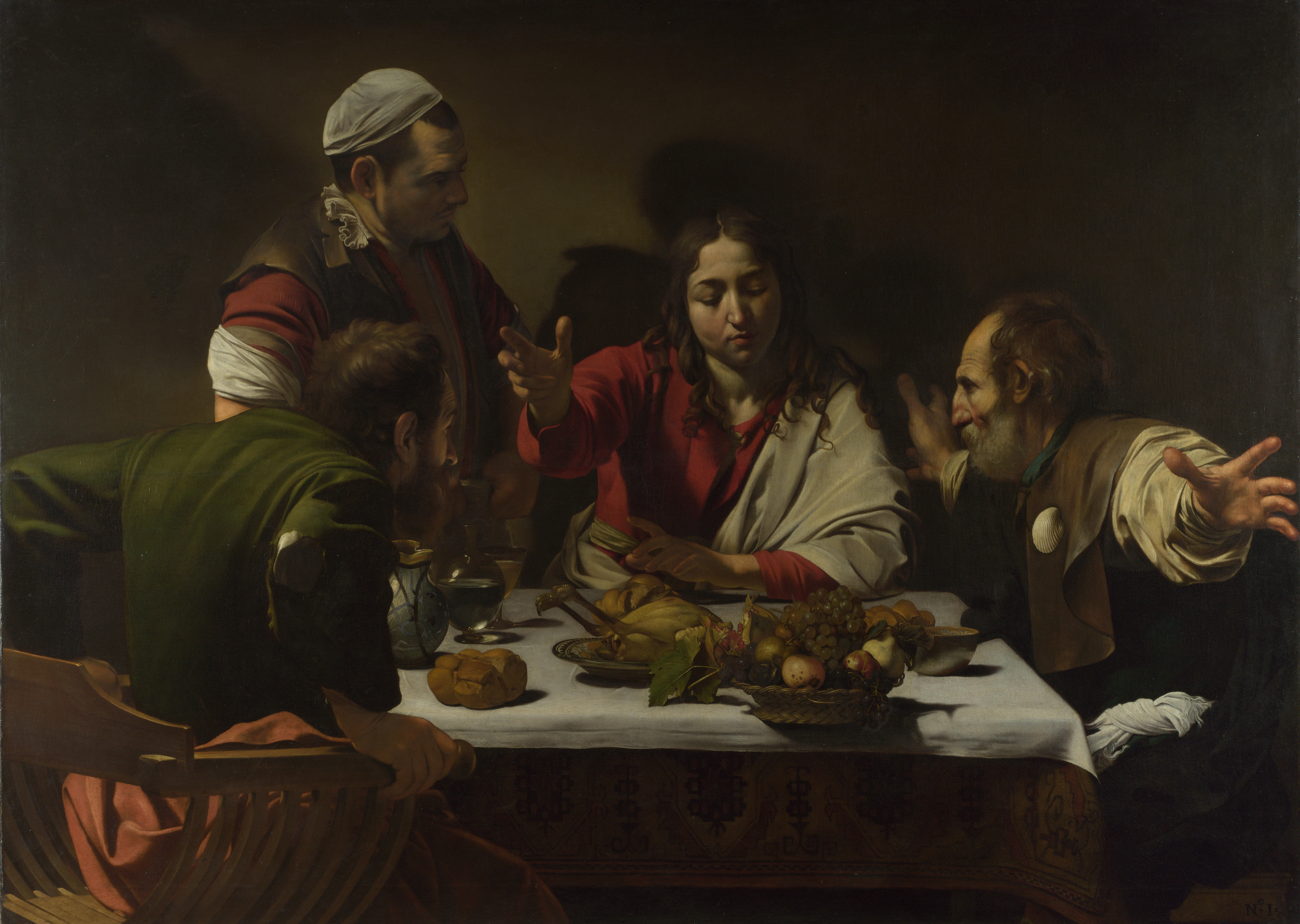
Caravaggio, Supper at Emmaus

Caravaggio, The Conversion of Saint Paul

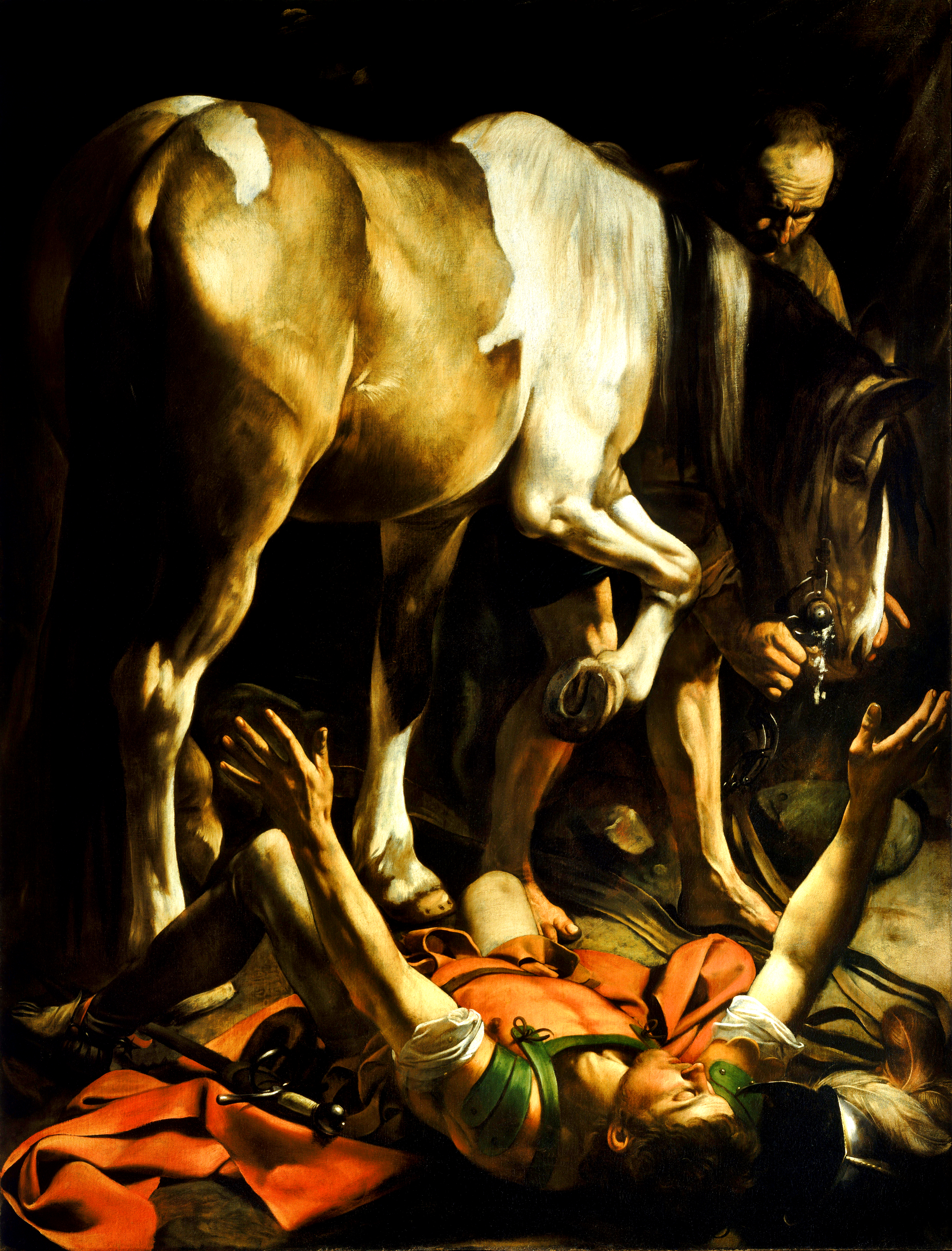
Caravaggio, Conversion on the Way to Damascus

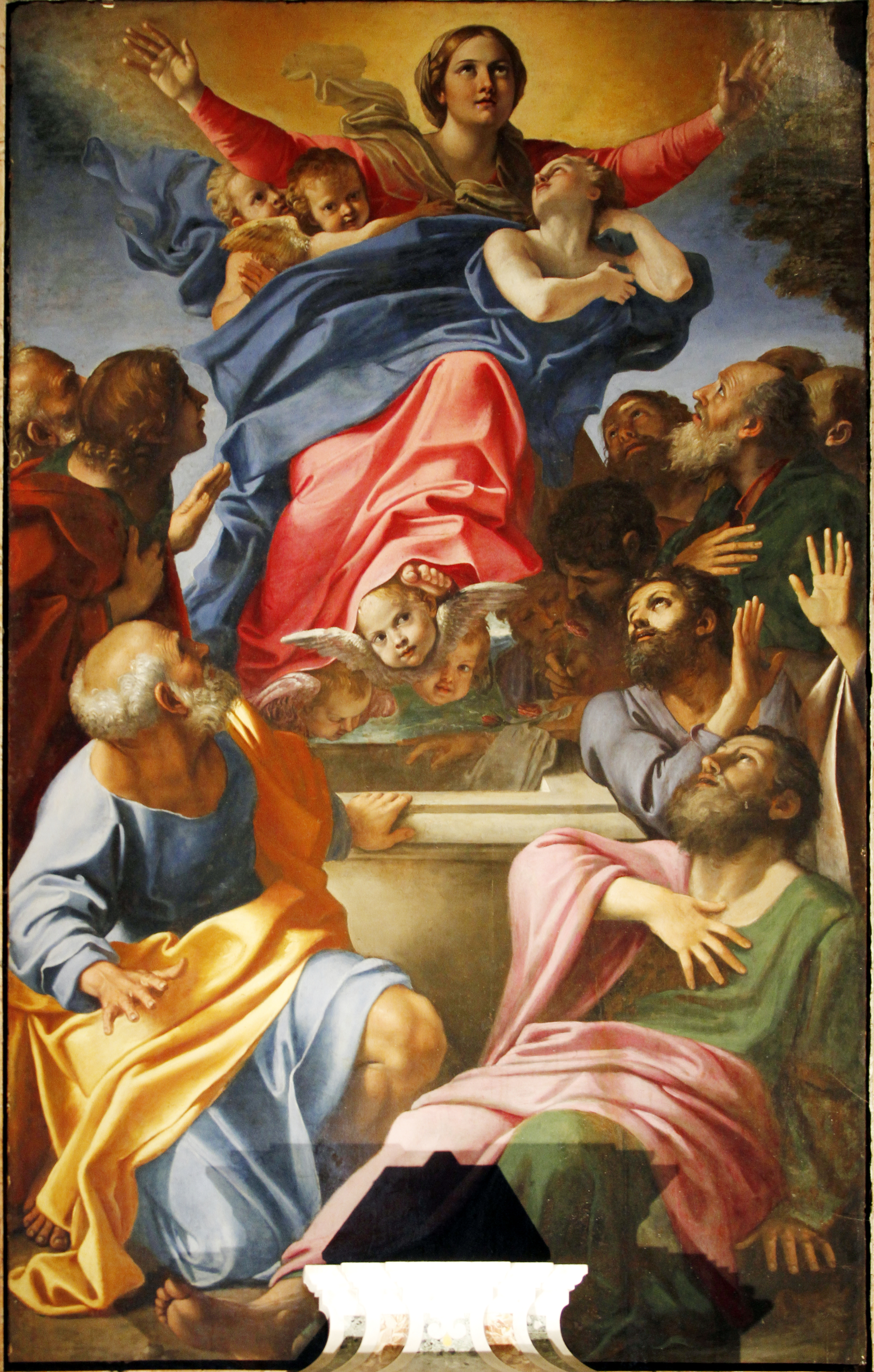
Annibale Carracci, Assumption of the Virgin
- Caravaggio
  - The Conversion of Saint Paul (1600-1601)
  - Conversion on the Way to Damascus
  - Crucifixion of St. Peter
  - Supper at Emmaus
- Annibale Carracci – Assumption of the Virgin (1600-1601, Cerasi Chapel, Santa Maria del Popolo, Rome)
- Peter Paul Rubens – The Deposition

== Births ==
- January 19 – Guido Cagnacci, Italian painter of the Bolognese School (died 1663)
- March 19 – Alonso Cano, Spanish painter, architect and sculptor (died 1667)
- September 13 – Jan Brueghel the Younger, Flemish painter (died 1678)
- November 15 – Cecco Bravo, Florentine painter of the Baroque period (died 1661)
- date unknown
  - Hendrick Bloemaert, Dutch Golden Age painter (died 1672)
  - Pieter de Bloot, Dutch painter (died 1658)
  - Martin Droeshout, engraver (died 1650)
  - Shi Kefa, Chinese government official and calligrapher (died 1645)
- probable
  - Simon de Vlieger, painter (died 1653)
  - Paulus Bor, Dutch painter (died 1669)
  - Michel Corneille the Elder, French painter, etcher, and engraver (died 1664)

== Deaths ==
- May 10 – Hans van Steenwinckel the Elder, Flemish/Danish sculptor and architect (born 1550)
- July 24 – Joris Hoefnagel, Flemish painter and engraver (born 1542)
- August 10 – Giovanni Alberti, Italian painter (born 1558)
- date unknown
  - Giacomo del Duca, Italian sculptor (born 1520)
  - Zacharias Dolendo, Dutch engraver (born 1561)
  - Teodoro Ghisi, Italian engraver (born 1536)
  - Hugues Sambin, French sculptor and woodworker (born 1520)
  - Paris Nogari, Italian painter (born 1536)
- probable – Cesare Vecellio, Italian engraver and painter (born 1530)
