= Assumption of the Virgin (Annibale Carracci, Rome) =

Painting by Annibale Carracci

- L'Assunzione della Vergine (Italian)
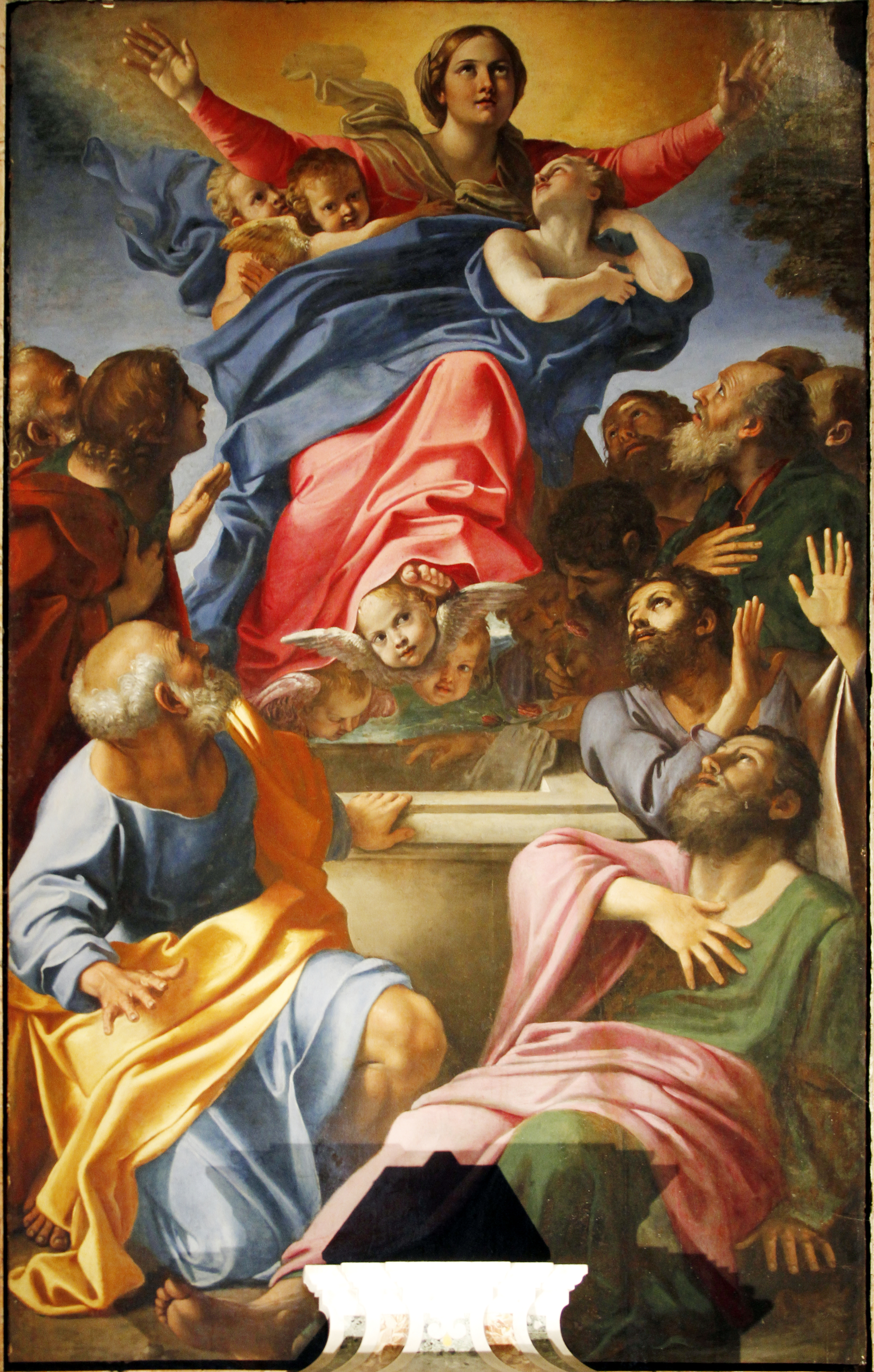
- Artist: Annibale Carracci
- Year: 1600–1601
- Medium: oil on wood
- Dimensions: 245 cm × 155 cm (96 in × 61 in)
- Location: Santa Maria del Popolo, Rome

The Assumption of the Virgin (Italian: L'Assunzione della Vergine) by Annibale Carracci is the altarpiece of the famous Cerasi Chapel in the church of Santa Maria del Popolo in Rome. The large panel painting was created in 1600–1601. The artwork is somewhat overshadowed by the two more famous paintings of Caravaggio on the side walls of the chapel: The Conversion of Saint Paul on the Road to Damascus and The Crucifixion of Saint Peter. Both painters were important in the development of Baroque art but the contrast is striking: Carracci's Virgin glows with even light and radiates harmony, while the paintings of Caravaggio are dramatically lit and foreshortened.

== History ==
The chapel in the left transept of the basilica was built by Monsignor Tiberio Cerasi, Consistorial Advocate and Treasurer-General to Pope Clement VIII. He purchased a chapel on the same spot from the Augustinian friars on 8 July 1600 and commissioned Carlo Maderno to rebuild the small edifice in Baroque style. In September Cerasi contracted Caravaggio to paint two panels for the side walls. Presumably another contract was signed at an early stage in the proceedings with Carracci for the altarpiece but this document has not been preserved. Preparatory studies and sketches by Carracci are preserved in the Royal Collection.

The commissions went to the leading artists in Rome at the time: during these years Carracci was busy working on the famous fresco cycle of the Palazzo Farnese for Cardinal Odoardo Farnese. Probably due to his increased workload in the palace, the three ceiling frescos in the chapel were executed by his assistant, Innocenzo Tacconi following Carracci's design. In these circumstances there was little reason for Carracci and Caravaggio to regard each other as business rivals, states Denis Mahon.

Tiberio Cerasi died on 3 May 1601 and was buried in the chapel. In his will he named the Fathers of the Hospital of the Madonna della Consolazione as his heirs with the responsibility to complete the still unfinished chapel. Annibale's altarpiece was probably already complete as deduced from an avviso written perhaps by Giulio Mancini and dated to 2 June:

"The principal painting in the chapel [is] by the said Carracci, those three paintings being, on the whole, of great excellence and beauty."

This is also confirmed by the fact that there are no recordings of payments in favor of Carracci in the documents concerning the management of the assets of Tiberio Cerasi drawn up after his death. The chapel was finally consecrated on 11 November 1606. It was dedicated to the Assumption of Mary.

== Description ==
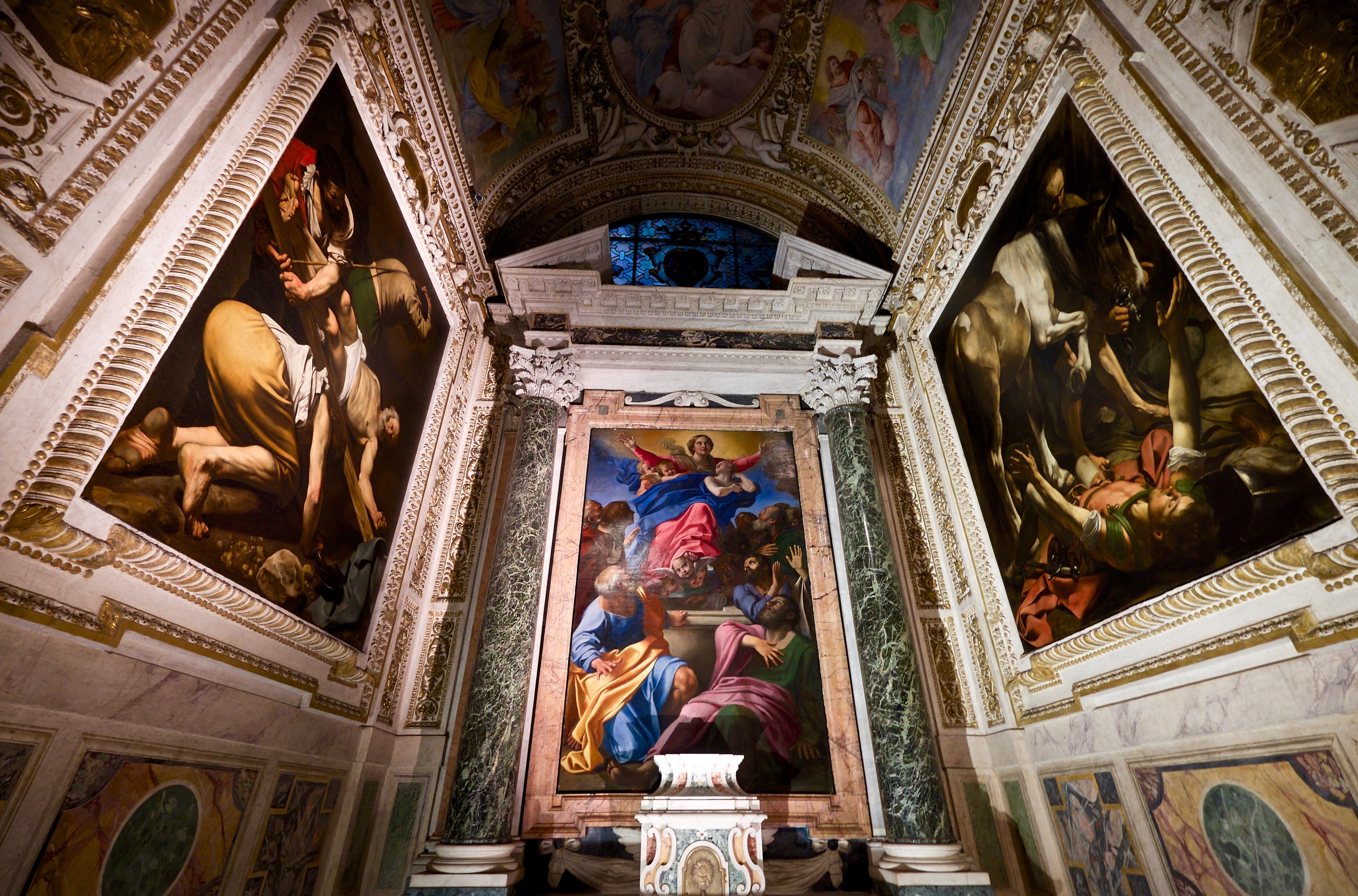
The painting was designed to be looked at as part of a larger ensemble

The altarpiece is the fulcrum of the decorative program of the chapel due to its subject and spatial position. There is a strong thematic connection with the scene of the Coronation of the Virgin in the central medaillon of the barrel-vault that shows the final episode in the Life of the Virgin after the Assumption. The painting also establishes a dialog with the two Caravaggio canvasses on the lateral walls: the most important figures among the apostles are Saint Peter (the older man on the left) and Saint Paul (on the right) in the foreground whose life story is told by Caravaggio (and also by the side paintings on the vault). The thematic and compositional connections prove that the altarpiece was designed to be looked at as part of a larger ensemble and not as a standalone object.

The rather crowded composition is organized around a triad of figures: the Virgin rising from the empty tomb (surrounded by a retinue of angels) and the two apostles gazing upwards in awe. All three wear robes in bright primary colours: blue over red (Mary), yellow over blue (Peter) and pink over green (Paul). The remaining space around the sarcophagus is filled with nine other apostles, bringing their overall number to eleven. "The stiffened forms and crowded composition [...] have been interpreted as a conscious shift to a 'hyper-idealized' manner that rejects the warmth and painterly qualities of his Bolognese period for a style indebted to ancient sculpture and to Raphael. Still neither ancient reliefs nor Raphael crowded their pictorial fields in this way", says Ann Sutherland Harris.

The painting largely follows the iconographic tradition concerning the depiction of the Assumption in Western art. John the Evangelist (on the left) is portrayed as a beardless young man among the older and bearded apostles. One member of the angelic retinue can be identified as Archangel Michael who lifted up Mary's body to heaven. An apostle on the right is looking at the grave linens and the roses that were found in the empty sarcophagus. On the other hand, the prominent position of the principes apostolorum is a nod to local sensitivities.

Mary seems to be projecting forward rather than upwards. It is a device that compensates for the confined environment and the rather low position of the altar. In this way, the Assumption meets the observer far beyond the narrow space of the Cerasi Chapel, ensuring its visibility from the transept, an ideal space for the continuation of Mary's motion. The dynamism, the emotional charge and the integration of the painting into real space are strongly innovative elements which make the panel unequaled among the contemporary altarpieces produced in Rome.

== Influences ==
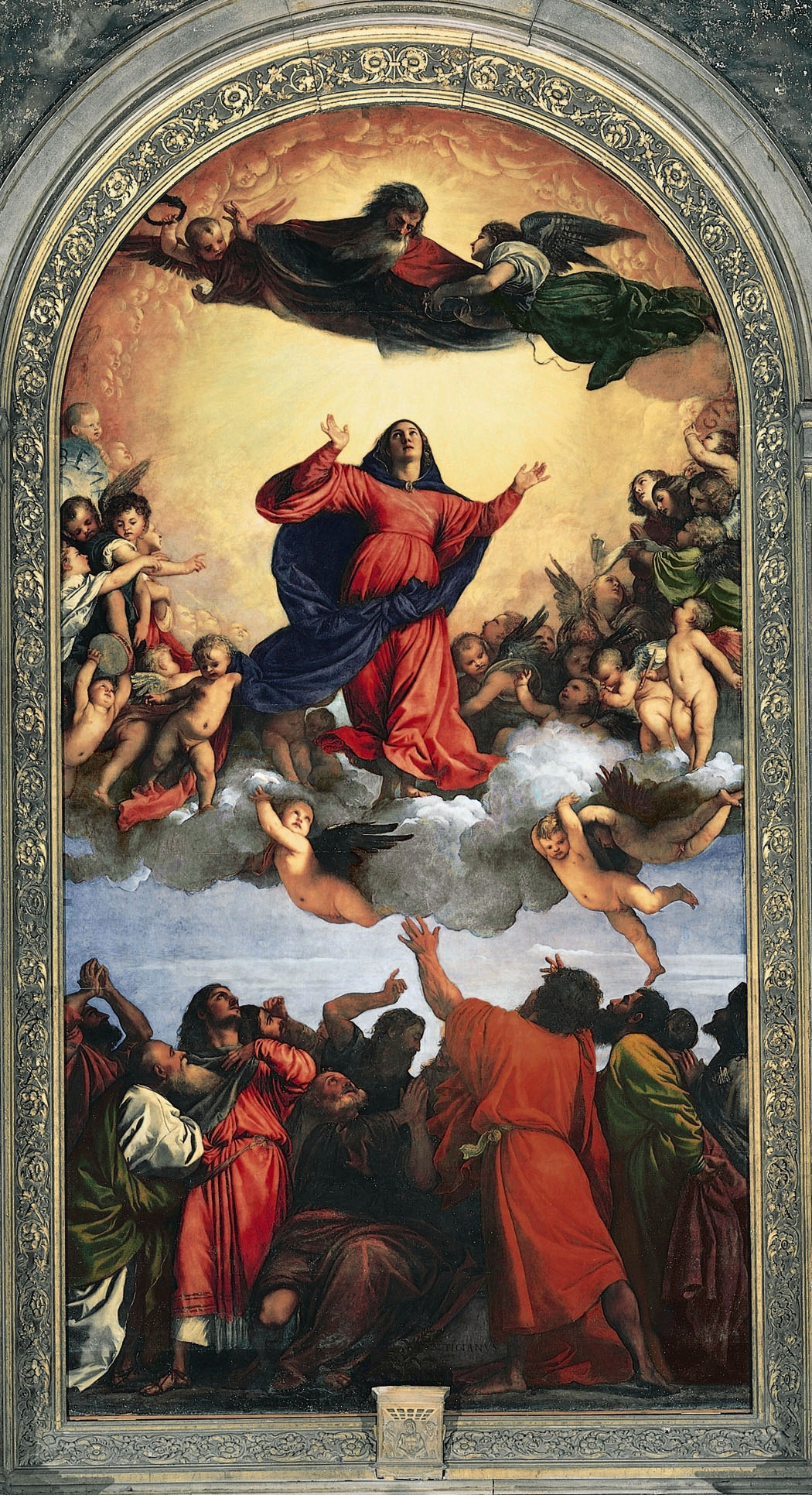
Titian's Assumption

A supposed model for the central figure is the Virgin of the Assumption by Giuseppe Valeriano and Scipione Pulzone in the Church of the Gesù. An even more important antecedent for the panel is the Transfiguration of Raphael, a masterpiece that Carracci much loved and studied. That Carracci took inspiration for the lighting - a strong spotlight effect giving a sculptural look to the forms - from Raphael, becomes clear if compare the figure of Saint Peter with the Saint Peter in the same location on the Transfiguration. The Assumption of the Virgin by Titian was another great Renaissance painting that may have influenced Carracci while working on the same subject, especially regarding the heads of some of the apostles in deep shadow and in profil perdu.

The relationship between the paintings of Caravaggio and Carracci in the chapel is a perpetual subject of discussion in art history. It seems probable that each artist "subtly altered his style of painting as a result of this direct confrontation with the other", and "Annibale's monumental saints, whose hands and feet seem to pierce the picture plane" may have influenced Caravaggio. The Cerasi Assumption was a turning point in Annibale's painting style as his compositions became darker, the figures larger and more monumental during the last phase of his career. Donald Posner termed his style in this period 'hyper-idealized'.

The painting was not regarded among Carracci's best works by his two 17th-century biographers. Giovanni Pietro Bellori only mentions it shortly when listing the late works of the artist while Carlo Cesare Malvasia is even more dismissive. Modern art history showed more appreciation. "The visual effects ensured that the spectators in the chapel space experienced for themselves the onrush of divine energy as the Virgin soared from the tomb, outward and over their heads into the painted vault of the crossing, where the actual Coronation was painted", says Rosemary Muir Wright. "The Virgin herself had become an icon of ideal beauty in a form which owed much of its perfection to the model of Raphael. This idealization provided the necessary reminder of the supernatural nature of the event, despite the obvious visual conviction of natural form and three-dimensional space."

== Gallery ==
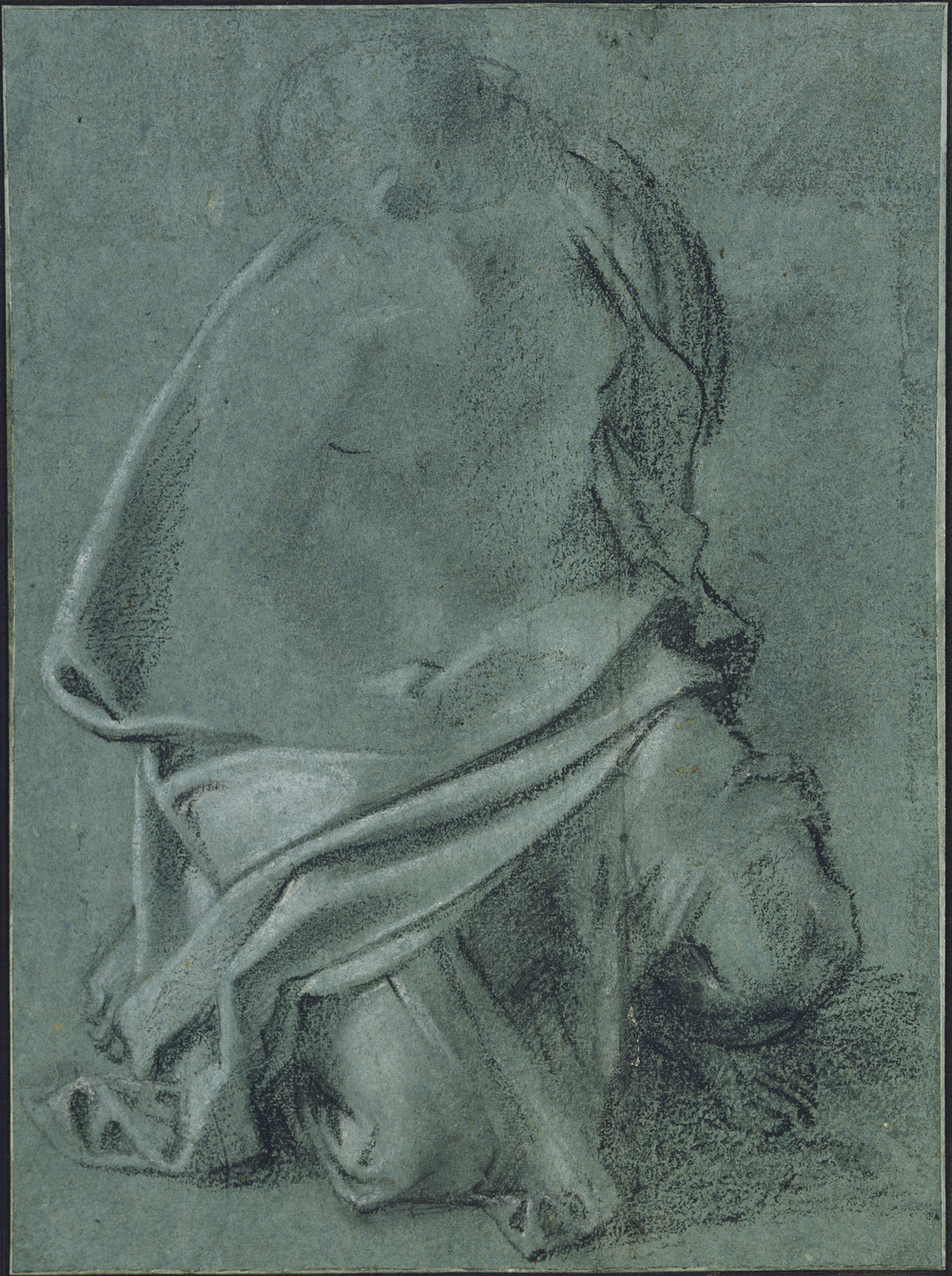
Saint Peter, preparatory study, Royal Collection

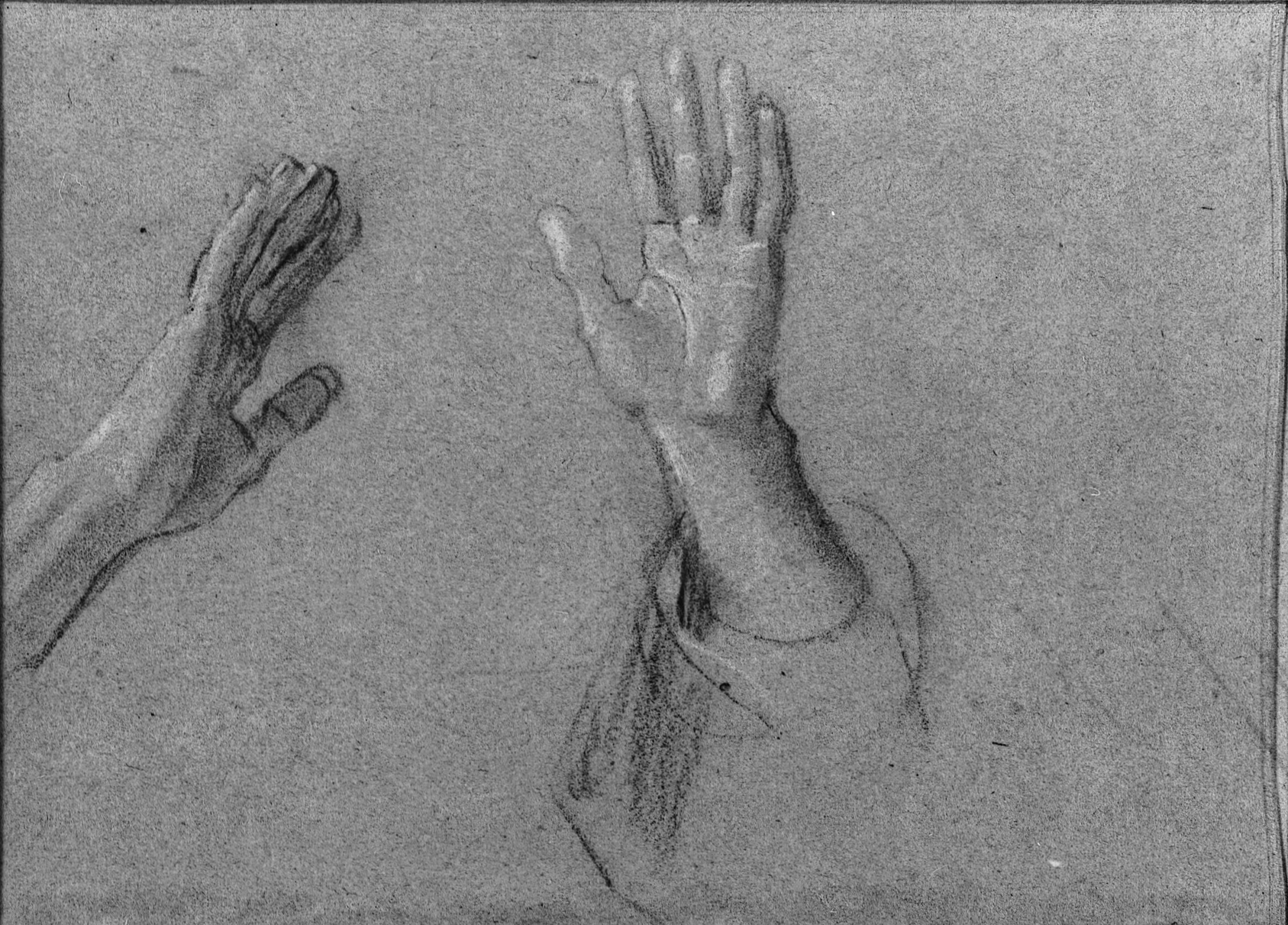
Hands of an apostle, preparatory study, Royal Collection

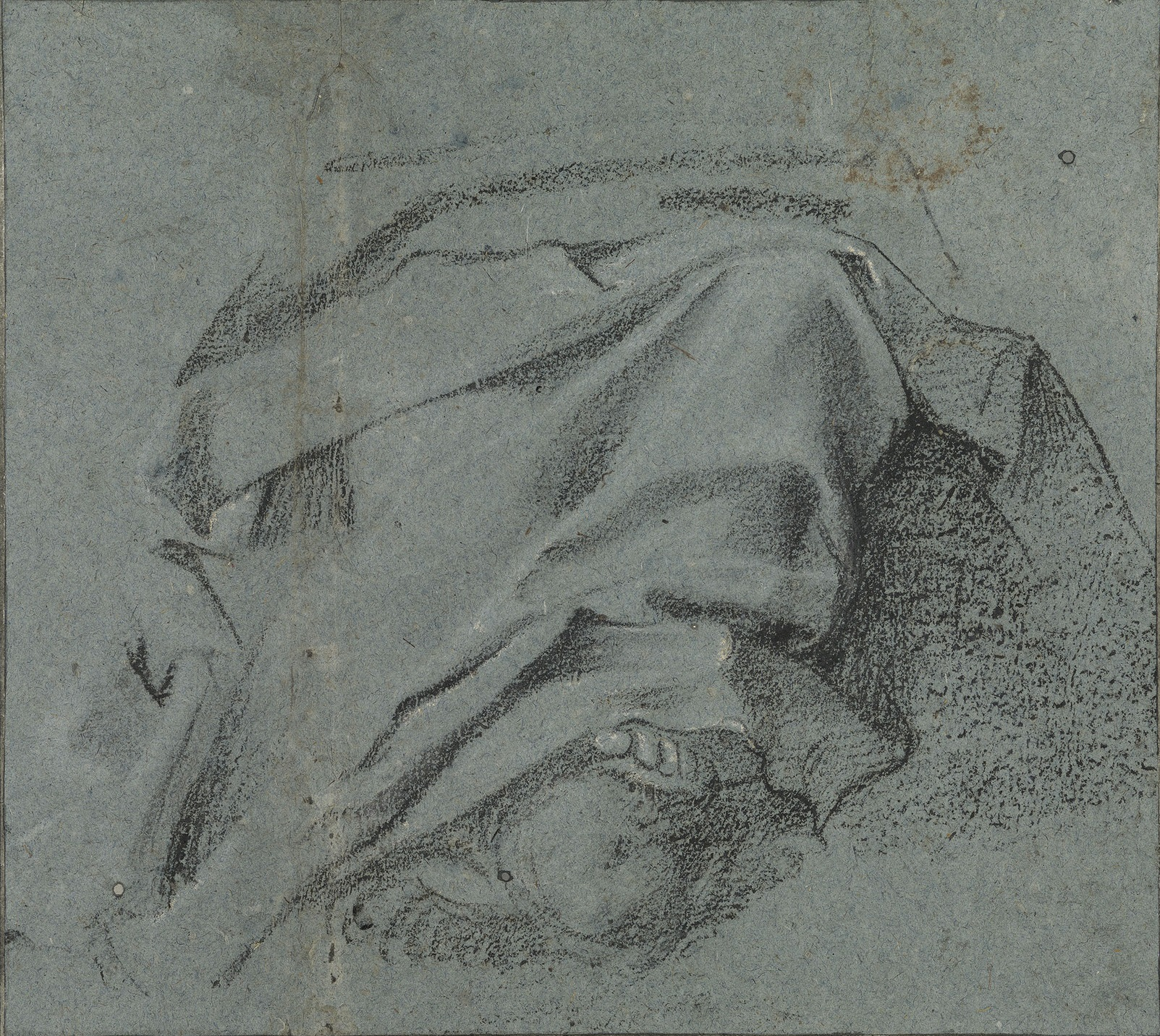
Robes of the Virgin, preparatory study, Royal Collection

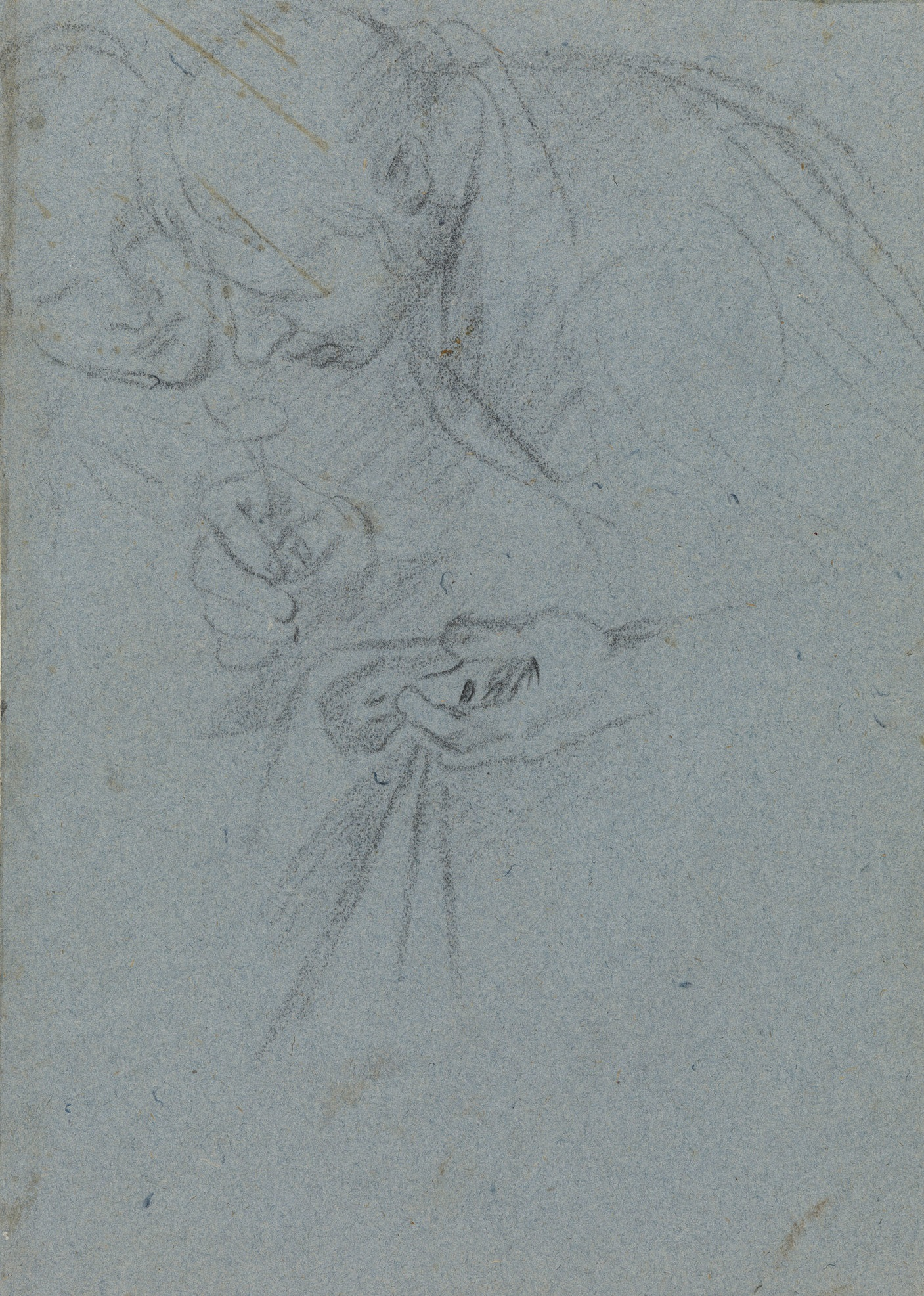
Two apostles bending over the tomb, sketch in the Royal Collection
