= Tiberio Cerasi =

Roman jurist and Treasurer-General to Pope Clement VIII

Monsignor Tiberio Cerasi
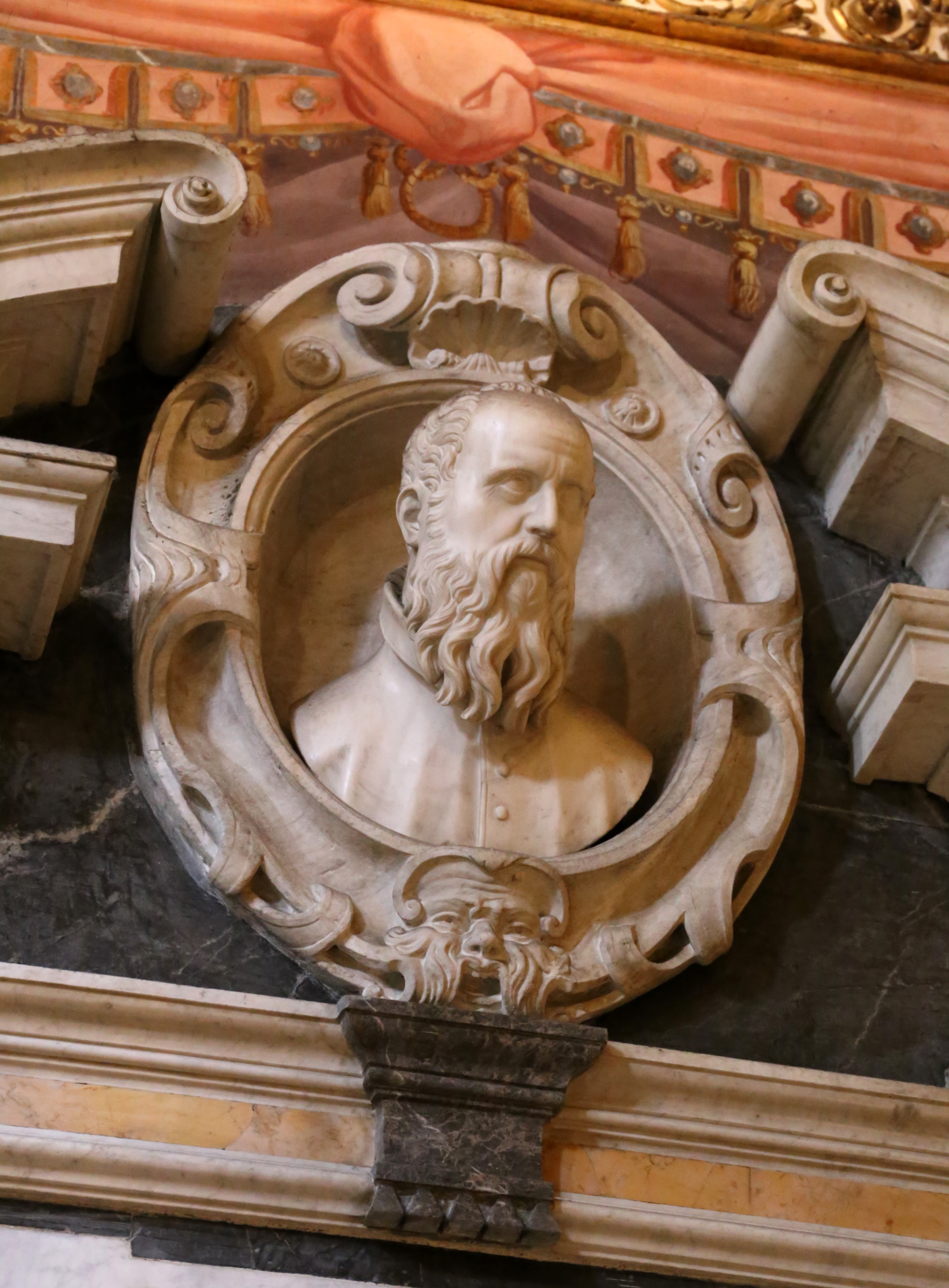

Treasurer-General of the Apostolic Camera
- In office July 1596 – 3 May 1601
- Preceded by: Bartolomeo Cesi
- Succeeded by: Luigi Capponi

Avvocato fiscale
- In office 1589–1596

Rector of the University
- In office 31 July 1593 – 1595
- Preceded by: Bernardino Biscia
- Succeeded by: Girolamo de' Rossi

Personal details
- Born: 1544 Rome, Papal States
- Died: 3 May 1601 (aged 56–57) Frascati, Papal States
- Resting place: Cerasi Chapel, Santa Maria del Popolo
- Education: University of Rome

Tiberio Cerasi (1544 – 3 May 1601) was a Roman jurist and Treasurer-General to Pope Clement VIII. He is mainly known for building the Cerasi Chapel in Santa Maria del Popolo, Rome and commissioning Caravaggio and Annibale Carracci to create three famous paintings there.

== Biography ==
He was born in Rome in 1544 to Stefano Cerasi and Bartolomea Manardi. His father, originally from Naples, was hired in Rome around 1522 as a surgeon at the Hospital of Santa Maria della Consolazione, obtaining Roman citizenship in 1530. His mother came from a Florentine family which may explain why Tiberio had important connections to some of the major Florentine personalities residing in Rome. His brother, Giovan Pietro became a doctor, and wrote a medical treatise (Methodo dello spetiale), which was published in Rome in 1574. Tiberio Cerasi studied jurisprudence, and probably acquired a doctorate of both laws.

He maintained a close relationship with Santa Maria della Consolazione, where his father had worked, and in August 1583 the hospital leased him a house for life in the Trevi district for an annual fee of 40 scudi. At that time he was already a lawyer in the Roman Curia, and became a consistorial advocate (avvocato concistoriale) and avvocato del fisco (attorney general) in 1589. On 22 September 1590, Cerasi donated the medical and philosophical books of his late father to the Consolazione Hospital under the condition that they will be preserved in the institution for the future use of its doctors. At the time he already lived in the Parione district.

On 31 July 1593 Cerasi was elected rector of the University for that year and later confirmed for the following year. It was probably towards this period that he embarked on an ecclesiastical career; in September 1595 he also left the post of avvocato fiscale to become a cleric of the Apostolic Camera (he bought this office for 30,000 scudi with special permission of the pope, instead of the usual sum of 40,000 scudi). In July 1596 he became Treasurer-General of the Apostolic Camera (tesoriere generale). When Clement VIII went to Ferrara in 1598 to take possession of the city, Cerasi was part of his retinue.

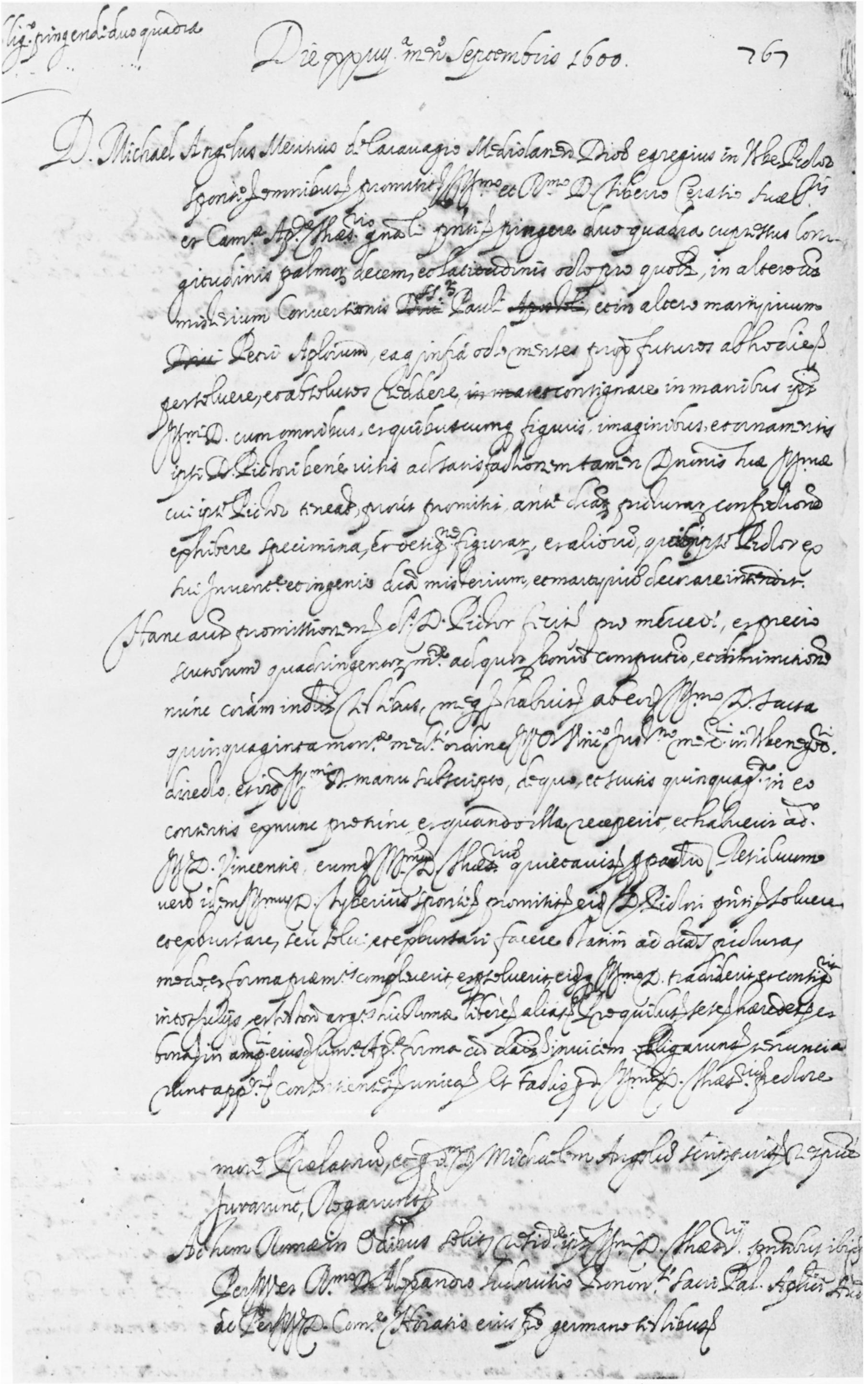
A notary's copy of the contract between Caravaggio and Cerasi.

Cerasi appears to have been a friend of Cardinal Federico Borromeo, a leading intellectual of the Roman Church at the time, to whom he addressed a letter from Rome on 30 September 1595, recalling "with what kindness and affection Your Most Illustrious Lordship has always held me in his protection". A collection of etchings of various hunting scenes by Antonio Tempesta, which was published in Rome under the title Primo libro di caccie varie in 1598, was dedicated to him.

He died on 3 May 1601 in a villa in Frascati where he had gone to cure his kidney illness and because the air was better there than in Rome. An autopsy found that he had contaminated lungs and a large stone in his intestines. He had made his will in March 1598, adding a codicil on the day before his death. In this he made the Hospital of Santa Maria della Consolazione his universal heir. He left 500 scudi to his employees and 500 scudi to a certain Giacomo, who had accompanied him to Ferrara. His assets consisted a vineyard outside Porta San Pancrazio, rented from Santa Maria in Trastevere, a house inherited from his father in Montecitorio, silverware, furniture and books. He left his collection of juridicial treatises to his auditor, Agostino Dena. He also left a villa in Albano, and a "luogo di Monte" (bond) at the church of Santa Maria di Monserrato, where his paternal grandmother, Bianca Sanchez, was buried. Similarly he left a "luogo di Monte" at the church of Santa Maria del Popolo. Two small houses at Santi Apostoli, a house and a vineyard in Castelgandolfo, and the small palace where he lived in the Pasquino district, returned to their rightful owners, the Consolazione Hospital, the estate of Castelgandolfo and Ulisse Gallo.

== His chapel ==
As Treasurer-General Cerasi had contacts with the artists and master builders who worked for the Holy See. Almost a year before his death he purchased a chapel in the Basilica of Santa Maria del Popolo from the Augustinian friars on 8 July 1600 and entrusted Carlo Maderno to rebuild the small edifice in Baroque style. He commissioned Caravaggio to paint two large cypress panels, ten palms high and eight palms wide, representing the conversion of Saint Paul and the martyrdom of Saint Peter within eight months for the price of 400 scudi. The contract was signed on 24 September 1600. Caravaggio was still working on the paintings at the time when Tiberio Cerasi died. The date when he commissioned the altarpiece from Annibale Carracci is unknown but this painting was probably already complete when Cerasi was buried in the chapel.

== Sources ==
- Franca Petrucci: Tiberio Cerasi in Dizionario Biografico degli Italiani - Volume 23 (1979)
