= Cerasi Chapel =

Chapel in the church of Santa Maria del Popolo, Rome

- Cappella Cerasi
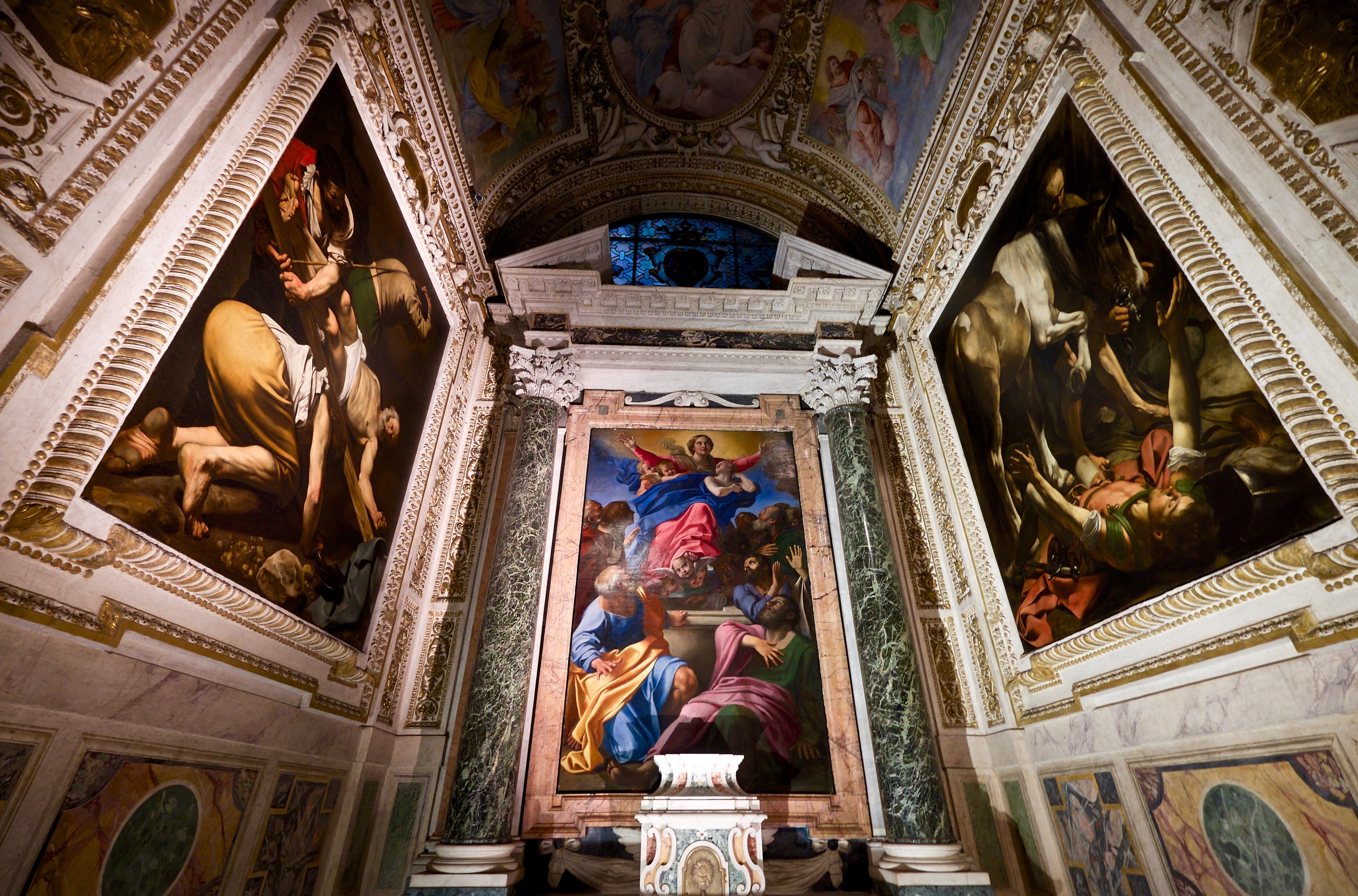

Religion
- Affiliation: Roman Catholic
- Status: funerary chapel

Location
- Location: Basilica of Santa Maria del Popolo, Rome
- Interactive map of Cerasi Chapel
- Coordinates: 41.911389°N 12.476389°E

Architecture
- Architect: Carlo Maderno
- Type: rectangular chapel with a larger anteroom
- Style: Baroque
- Founder: Tiberio Cerasi
- Completed: 1606

The Cerasi Chapel or Chapel of the Assumption (Italian: Cappella Cerasi, Cappella dell'Assunta) is one of the side chapels in the left transept of the Basilica of Santa Maria del Popolo in Rome. It contains significant paintings by Michelangelo Merisi da Caravaggio and Annibale Carracci, two of the most important masters of Italian Baroque art, dating from 1600 to 1601.

== History ==
=== Precursor: Foscari Chapel ===
Before the present-day edifice another funerary chapel on the same spot was dedicated to the Virgin Mary. It was built by Pietro Foscari, the Cardinal of Venice. Johann Burchard notes in his diary that the cardinal died on 11 August 1485. "His body was then transferred to the city, and given over for burial in a chapel of the Church of Santa Maria del Popolo, which he had built for himself", states Burchard. This construction obviously correlated to the general rebuilding of the basilica by Pope Sixtus IV which began in 1472. The Cardinal of Venice was an influential person in the Roman court and Italian politics. It seems an obvious choice that he built himself a chapel in the Pope's favourite church in a very prominent position in the left transept. The construction might have begun in 1476.

The chapel was covered by a barrel vault with a depth equal to the 15th century arch of the papal chapel. According to the will of the patron, the sarcophagus, which was due to host his remains, was placed at the center of the edifice. Due to its particular placement and visibility the sarcophagus was decorated on all four sides. This arrangement was markedly different than the Florentine type wall tombs of the basilica. Probably it was modelled after the tomb of Pope Sixtus IV by Pollaiuolo or even more after other 15th century sculptural works in the city of Siena. This sepulchral monument is the only remaining vestige of the demolished chapel. Now it is placed in the Costa Chapel in the right aisle.

The bronze gisant is attributed to a Sienese sculptor, Giovanni di Stefano, a follower of Vecchietta, who was commissioned by the heirs of Cardinal Pietro Foscari and used a funerary mask for the modelling of the face.

=== Tiberio Cerasi's chapel ===
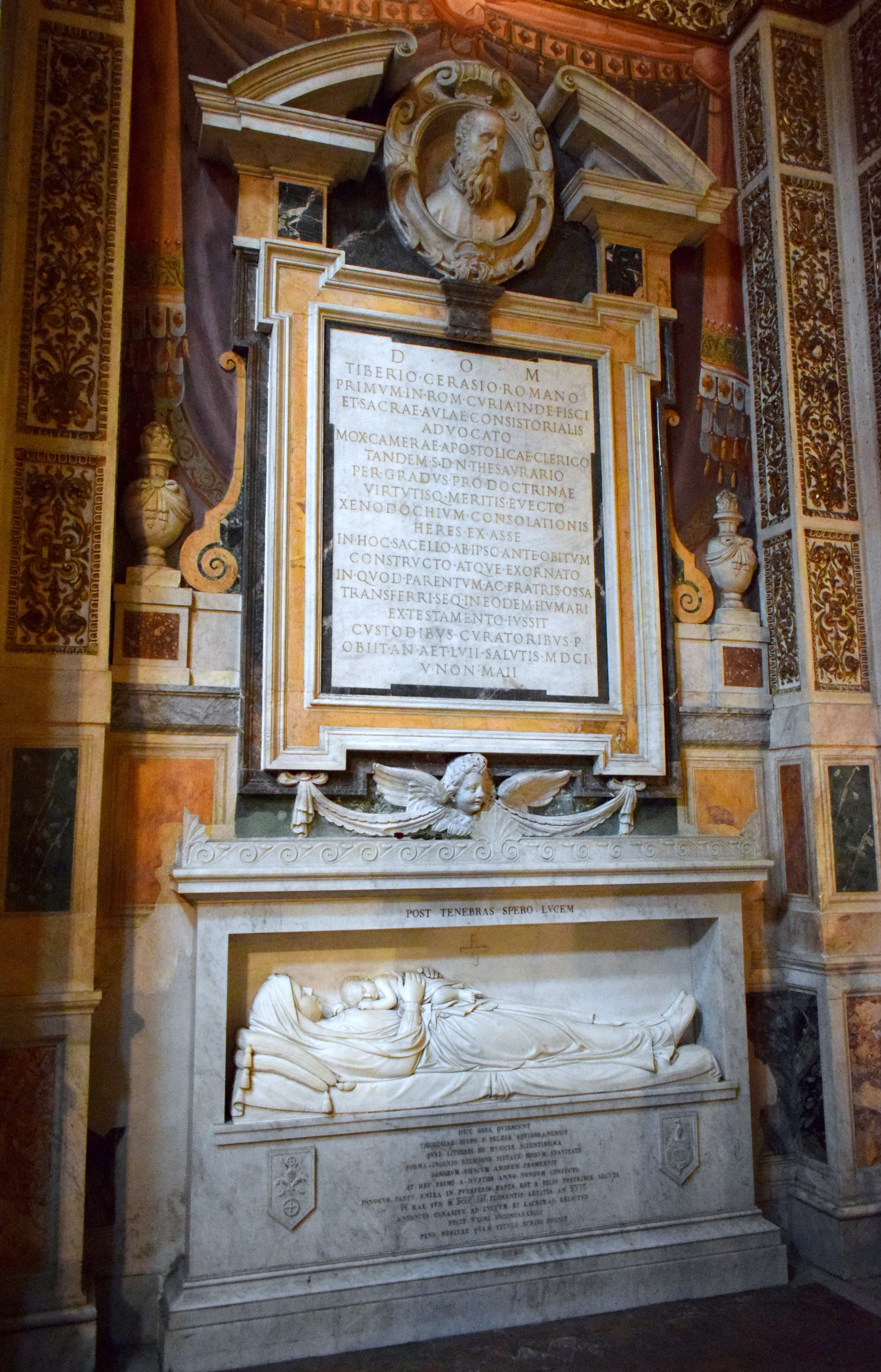
The funeral monument of Tiberio Cerasi.

The patronage rights of the chapel were purchased on 8 July 1600 by Monsignor Tiberio Cerasi, Treasurer-General of Pope Clement VIII. He bought the chapel from the Augustinian friars with the option to rebuild and adorn it "in the manner and form" he wanted to. The edifice was reconfigured by Carlo Maderno who was referred to as the architect of the still unfinished chapel in the 2 May 1601 codicil to Cerasi's will.

In September Cerasi contracted Caravaggio to paint two panels for the side walls; the contract with Annibale Caracci for the altarpiece has not been preserved. The commissions went to the leading artists in Rome at the time. Caracci painted The Assumption of Mary while Caravaggio depicted the Conversion of Saint Paul and the Crucifixion of Saint Peter on the lateral walls. Cerasi's choice of the Assumption for the altar seems straightforward enough, while the other two paintings honoured the Apostles central to the foundation of the Catholic Church as well as popular Counter-Reformation themes of conversion and martyrdom. The precedent already existed for this juxtaposition in the Cappella Paolina at the Apostolic Palace by Michelangelo. Saint Peter and Paul were also the patrons of Rome and they had a strong connection with the papacy. Because Tiberio Cerasi did not belong to the ranks of the Roman aristocracy and he made his career and fortune in the Roman Curia, it was important to emphasize his proximity to papal power and the Church of Rome.

The first versions of the Caravaggio paintings were rejected by the patron and then Caravaggio painted two canvasses instead of the cypress panels as it had been formerly stipulated. The story of the rejection of the first versions was recorded by Giovanni Baglione in his 1642 Life of Caravaggio.

Tiberio Cerasi died on 3 May 1601 and was buried in the chapel. In his will he named the Hospital of the Madonna della Consolazione as his heir with the responsibility to complete the unfinished chapel. Annibale's altarpiece was probably already complete at the time while Caravaggio was paid on 10 November 1601 for his work. The paintings were finally installed in the chapel by a woodworker named Bartolomeo in May 1605, and the chapel was consecrated on 11 November 1606.

The chapel was acquired by a descendant of the family, Antonio Cerasi, count of Monterado in 1853 who subsequently restored it.

== Description ==
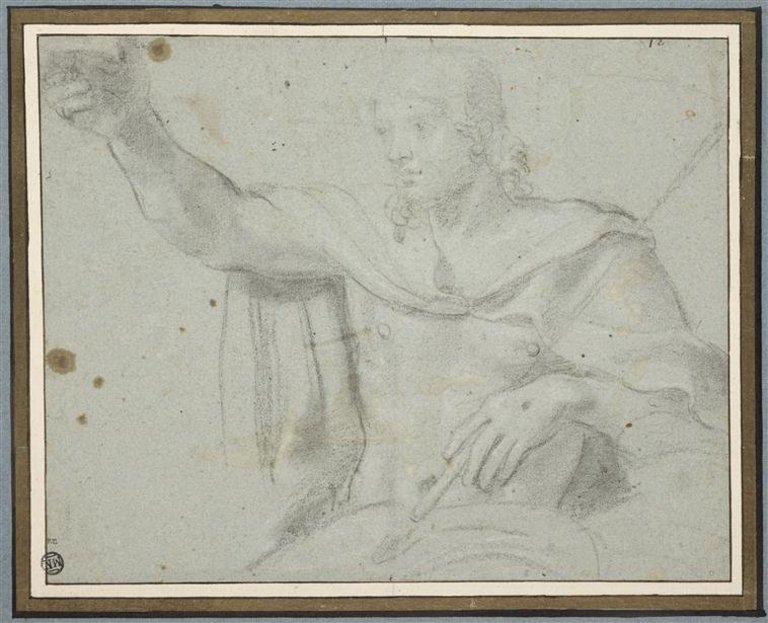
Preparatory study for the Coronation of the Virgin on the vault.

The oblong shaped chapel consists of a sail-vaulted anteroom and a narrower, barrel-vaulted chancel with the altar. The space is lit dimly by light coming through a lunette window on the back wall. The arched entrance is closed by a balustrade of colourful marble. The focal point of the architecture is the altar. It was built of white and colourful marble in the shape of an aedicule adorned with two large Corinthian columns, two half-pilasters and a broken pediment. The Cerasi coat-of-arms is depicted in the center of the stained glass lunette window. From the outside the chapel is invisible because it is hemmed in by the neighbouring parts of the basilica and a narrow, walled courtyard. The architect skillfully maximized the very small space left between the presbytery (on the right) and the 16th-century Theodoli Chapel (on the left), and created the impression of "a miniature Latin-cross church, complete with transept, domed crossing, and choir. The nave [...] is supplied by the visitor's motion, his sense of direction and focus".

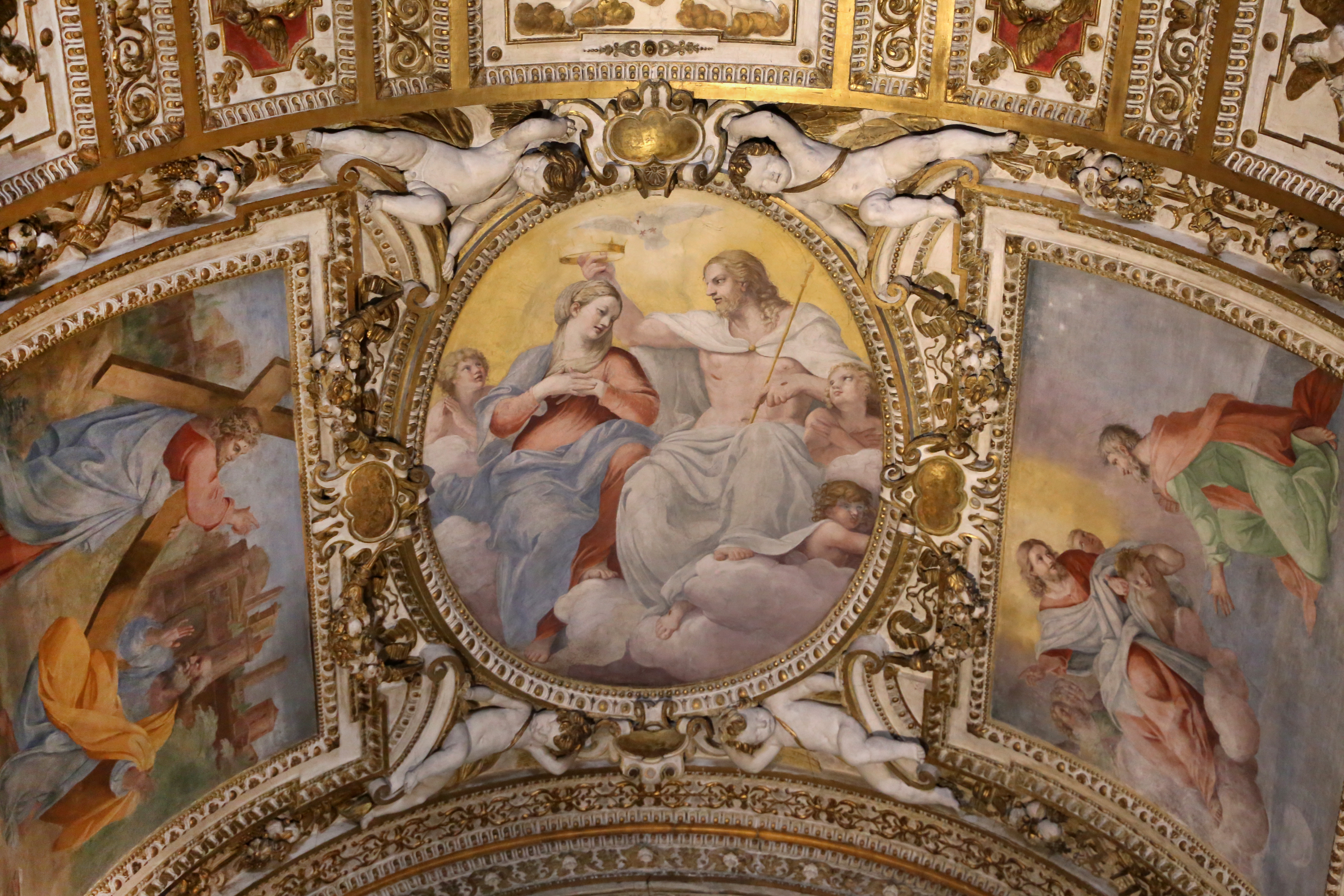
Coronation of the Virgin and side panels by Innocenzo Tacconi.

Caravaggio's dramatically lit and foreshortened paintings are intended to be viewed from the side rather than straight-on, and draw the eye to Carracci's frontally presented Assumption, so that the chapel is aesthetically united despite the very different styles of the two artists. According to Steinberg the light on the Caravaggio paintings comes from the painted heaven on the vault of the anteroom, inhabited by the dove of the Holy Spirit. On the other hand, Varriano claims that the "source" of the light seems to be the clerestory window across the transept.

The chapel is decorated in exuberant Baroque style. The frescos on the short barrel-vault of the chancel depict the Coronation of the Virgin (central medaillon) and the visions of Sts Peter and Paul, Domine quo vadis and Saint Paul Transported to the Third Heaven (side panels), both set in rich gilded stucco frames. The frame of the central medaillon is held by four stucco putti. The paintings were executed by Innocenzo Tacconi, an able assistant of Annibale Carracci, and at least the coronation scene was designed by Carracci himself. This is proved by a detailed preparatory drawing of the figure of Christ in almost the same position as in the executed fresco which was preserved in the Louvre. A far less elaborate sketch of the meeting of Christ and St Peter in front of a city gate, which was made for the Domine quo vadis panel by Carracci, was identified by Hans Tietze in the collection of the Albertina. Baglione identified the right-hand panel as Paul in Third Heaven (mentioned in the Second Letter to the Corinthians) while others believe it represents Christ ordering Paul to leave Jerusalem (Acts 22:17–21) or even a synthesis of the two episodes. The setting of the fresco is celestial with Christ surrounded by angels and reclining on clouds. On the right is the constellation of Ursa Major, perhaps a hidden signature of Annibale, playing on the assonance of the word carro (meaning cart, the constellation is also known as Grande Carro in Italian) and his own surname, Carracci.

Iconographically the side panels "relate to the Caravaggio paintings in that they manifest the divine cause of what passes below" them. Similarly the Coronation scene is placed above Carracci's Assumption as a direct continuation. The vault forms a celestial zone in close contact with the three famous paintings below. These relationships indicate that the artists worked in a compositional framework conceived by the patron or even more his friend and artistic adviser, Marchese Vincenzo Giustiniani. (That Caravaggio received 50 scudi as advance payment from Giustiniani, when he signed the contract to the two paintings, may be a hint to his role.)

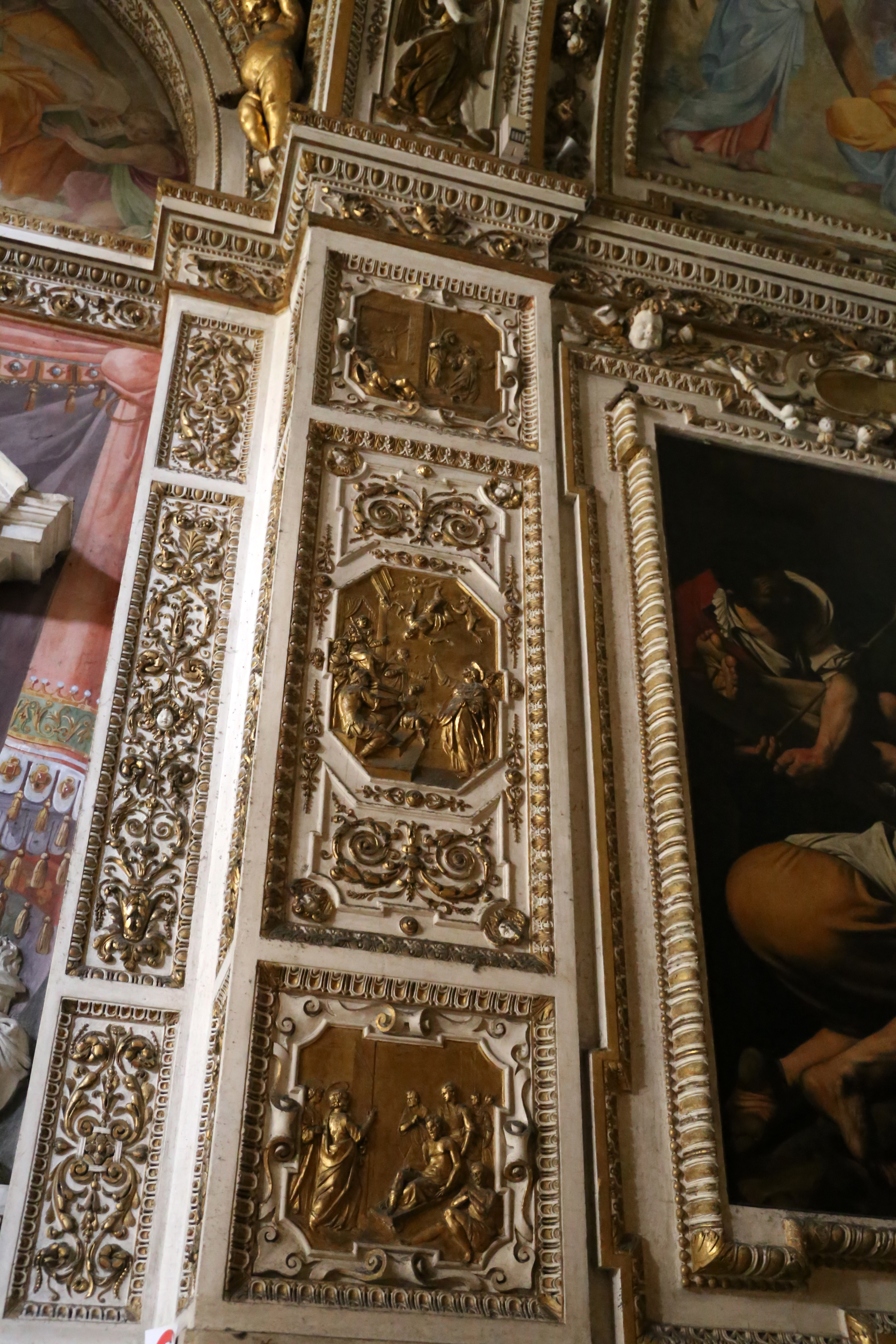
Scenes from the life of Peter

The intrados of the arch between the chancel and the anteroom is decorated with white-gold stucco panels with two putti holding a wreath (top) and angels playing the harp and the flute (above the cornice). The stucco decoration on the pillars is similar but the figurative panels are gilded. The panels are directly related to the paintings of Caravaggio because they depict episodes from the life of St Peter and St Paul. The episodes from the life of Paul are on the right (from the top to bottom): Paul and Barnabas in Lystra refusing the sacrifice of a bull by the priest of Jove (Acts 14:8–18); Saul's baptism by Ananias (Acts 9:10–21) and The stoning of Stephen (Acts 7:54–60) which Saul had witnessed guarding the coats of the executioners. The episodes from the life of Peter are on the left (from the top to bottom): Peter delivered from prison (Acts 12:6–11); The Fall of Simon Magus (Acts of Peter XXXII) and Peter and John healing the cripple (Acts 3:1–10). The lower zone of the walls, up to a height of 2.2 m from the floor, is covered with fake painted marble, interspersed with real white and black marble slabs. The other surfaces are decorated with dense white-gold floral motifs.

The frescos in the anteroom of the chapel depict the Holy Spirit in the central oval medaillon and the Evangelists with their usual symbols and helpful putti on a golden background. The Doctors of the Church (Saint Augustine and Jerome; Saint Ambrose and Gregory the Great) are in the two lunettes. The oval form is repeated in the pattern of the terracotta pavement. The frescos of the anteroom were attributed to Giovanni Battista Ricci by Giovanni Baglione in his Lives. The attribution is generally accepted by modern scholars. Two preparatory studies for the lunette paintings are preserved in the Louvre. Four golden putti in the spandrels seem to support the vault. As Giovanni Battista Ricci was a dependable but rather mediocre artist compared to Carracci and Caravaggio, Tiberio Cerasi's heirs probably chose him to complete the unfinished chapel in a quick and economical way.

There are funeral monuments on the lateral walls of the anteroom, one for Tiberio Cerasi, the founder of the chapel on the left and another for his father, Stefano Cerasi (†1575) and his mother, Bartolomea Manardi on the right (†1573). These are typical Baroque wall monuments with the carved busts of the deceased set in oval niches, curved broken pediments and long epitaphs. The projecting heads are turned towards the altar. The monuments have painted backgrounds with rich draperies and flaming urns. The tomb itself, where his father, mother and brother had been buried, was mentioned in Tiberio Cerasi's will in 1598; it was probably located under the floor of the transept.

The 19th-century Neoclassical tomb of Teresa Pelzer, a young German woman from Aachen and the wife of Count Antonio Cerasi, was inserted into the wall under the monument of Tiberio Cerasi. She died in 1852 at the age of 27 in childbirth and her baby died with her. Their sculpture was created by Giuseppe Tenerani who finished the monument in 1857. The Latin inscription on their grave says: Post tenebras spero lucem (After Darkness I Hope Light). Teresa Pelzer is portrayed sleeping on her bed, and she is holding her dead child on her breast. The benefactor of the public hospital of San Giacomo degli Incurabili, Paolo M. Martinez (†1833) was buried under the pavement, but his monument was placed on the external left pillar.

== Gallery ==
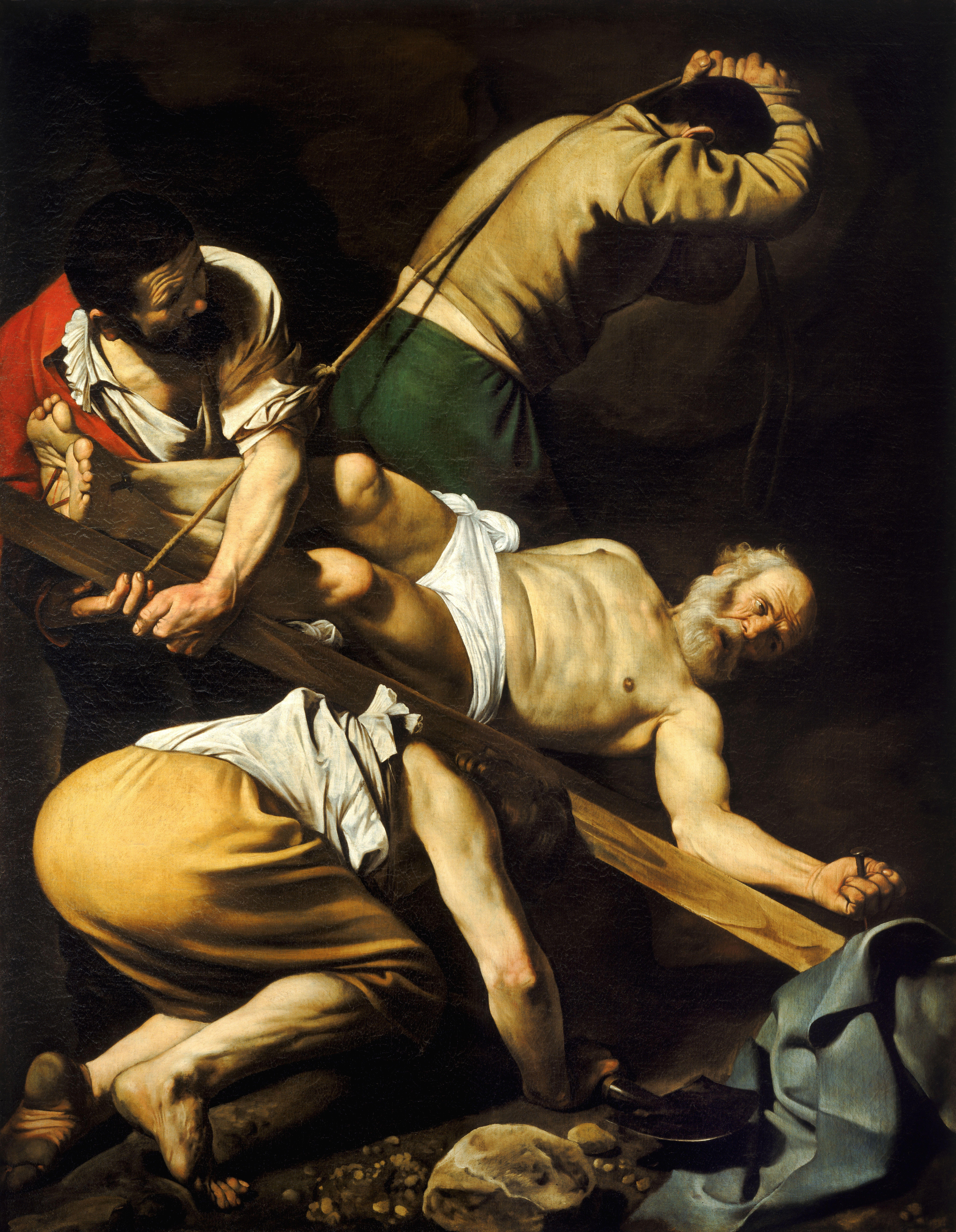
Crucifixion of St. Peter (Caravaggio)

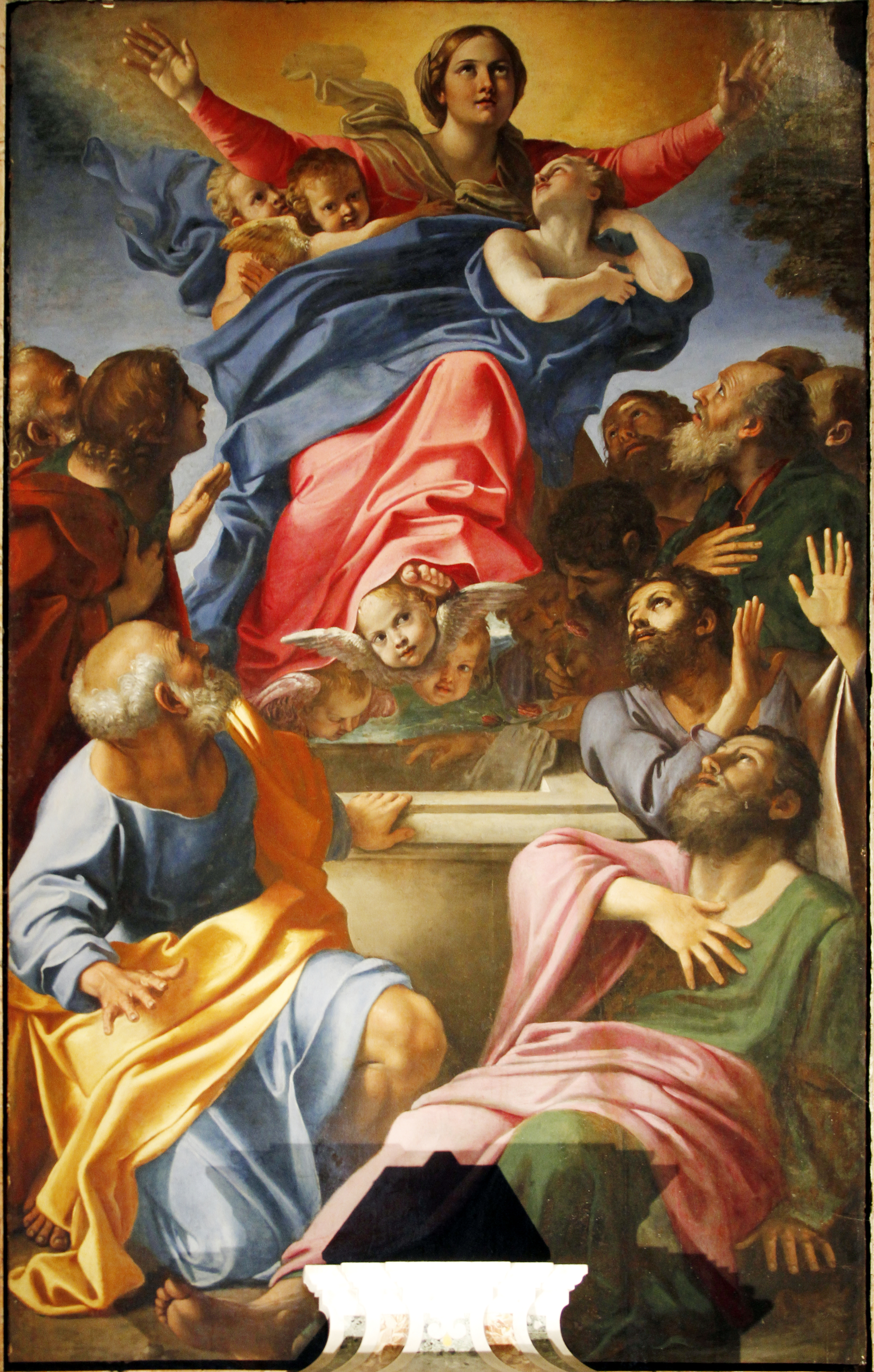
Assumption of the Virgin Mary (Carracci)

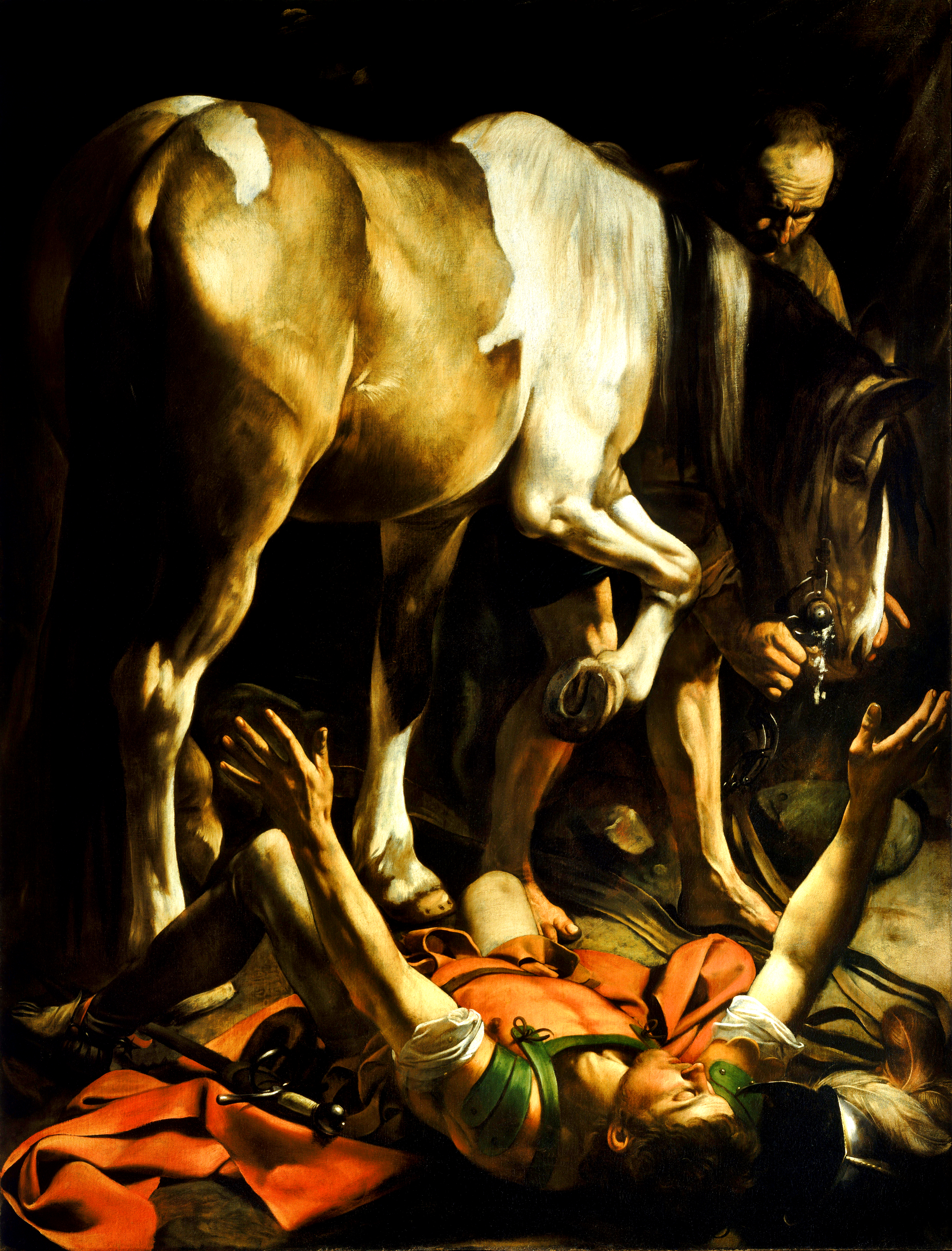
Conversion of Saint Paul (Caravaggio)

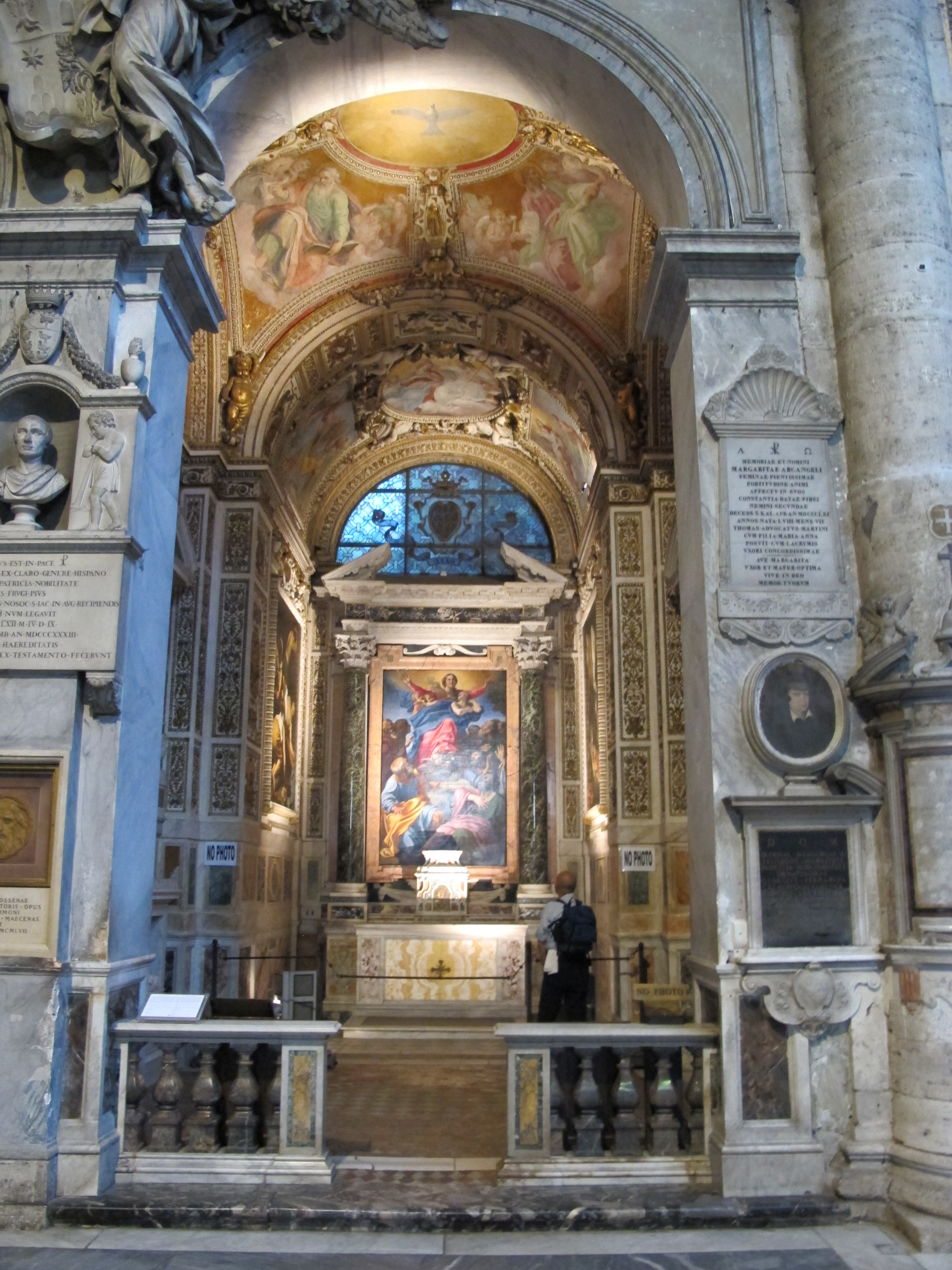
The chapel from the transept

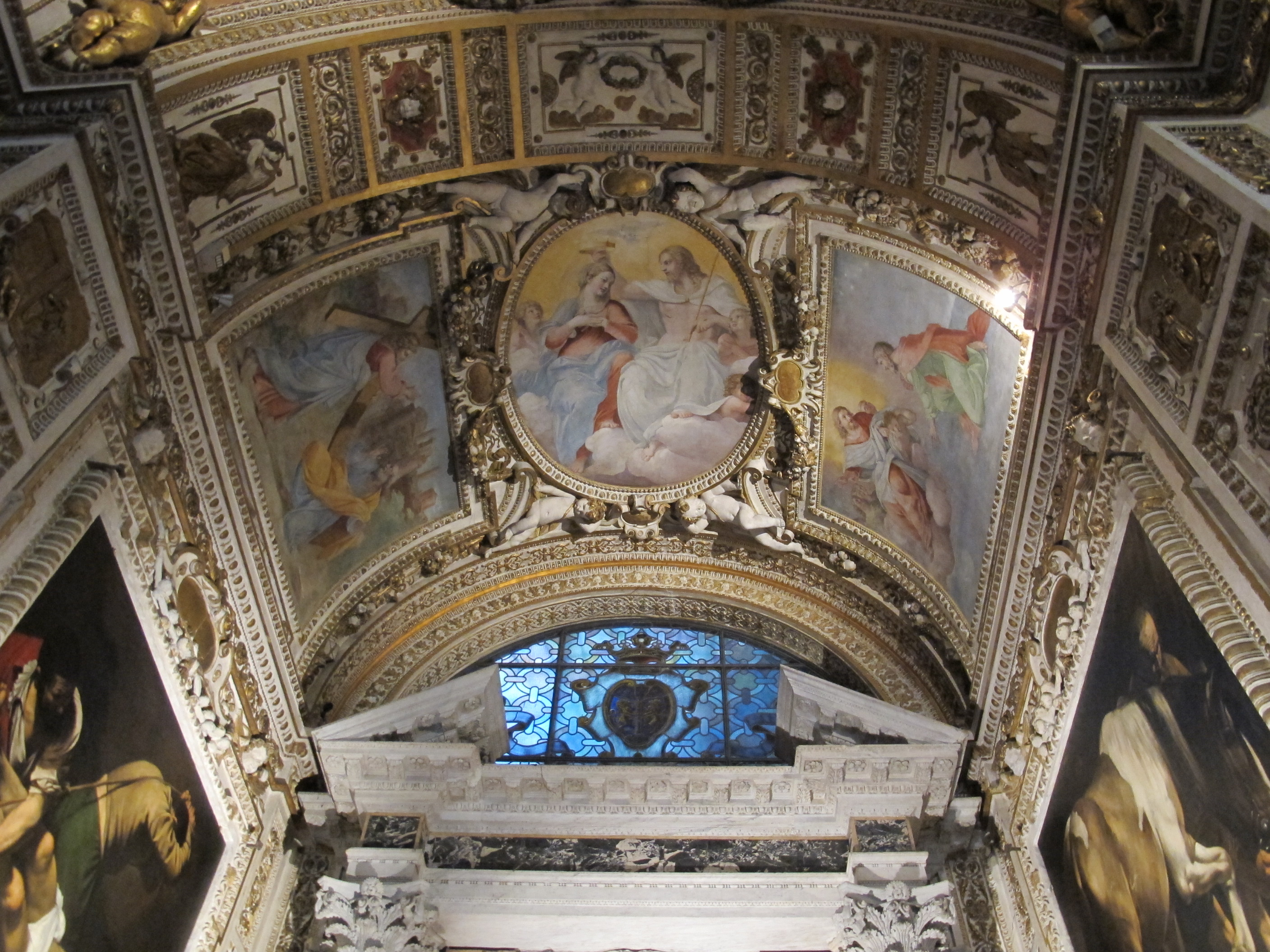
Frescos of Innocenzo Tacconi on the vault

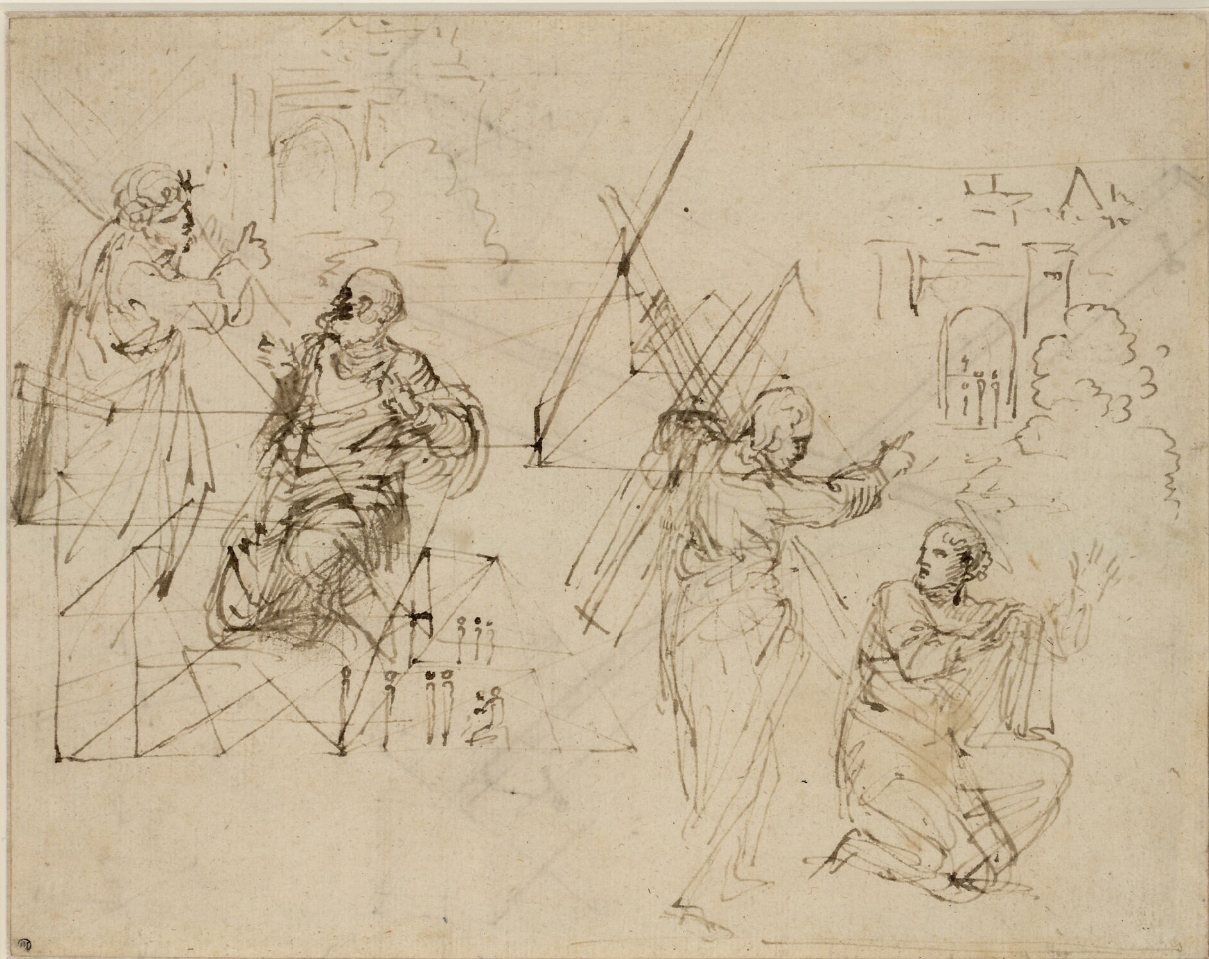
Sketches for the Domine quo vadis panel

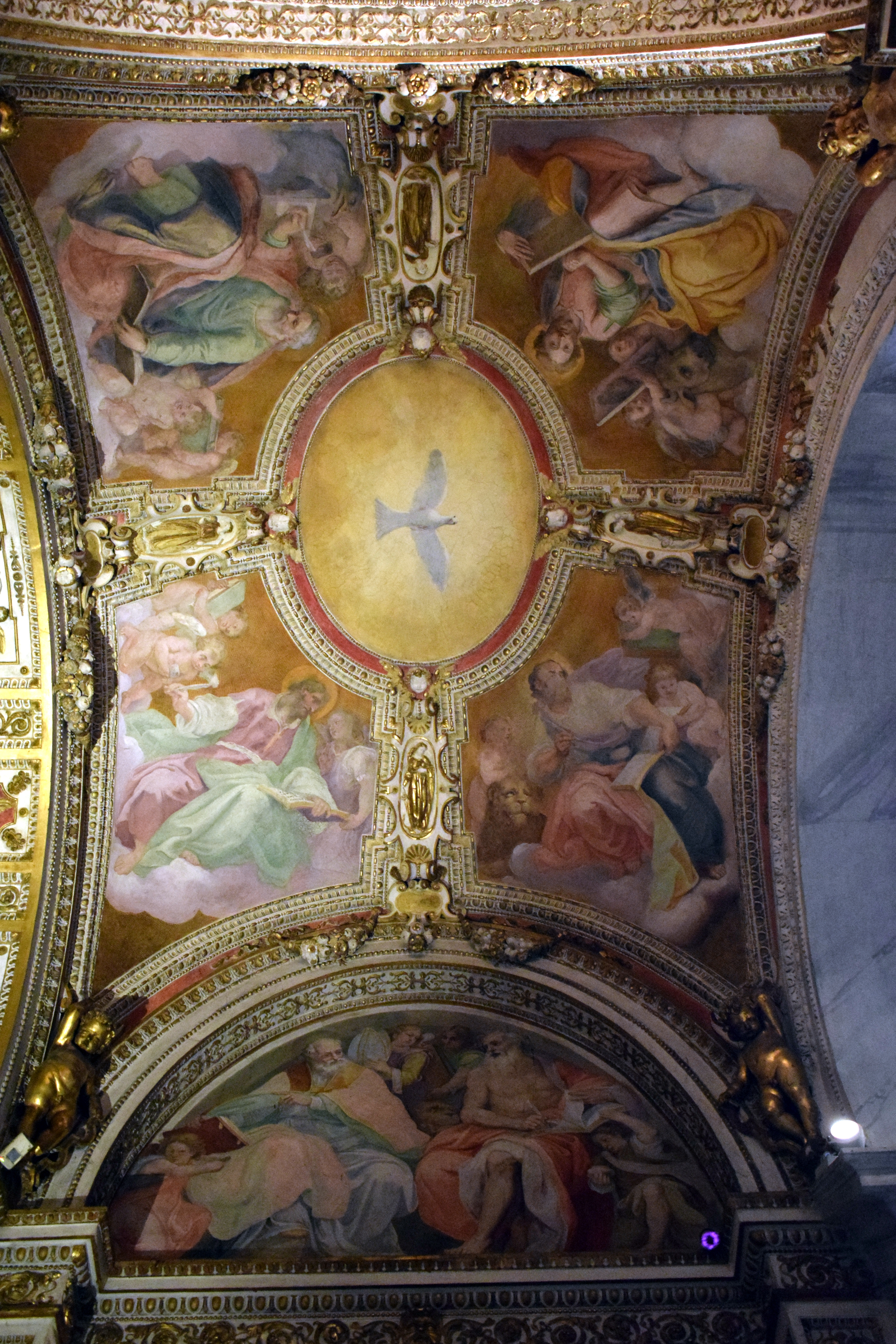
The frescos of Giovanni Battista Ricci in the anteroom: the Holy Spirit and the Evangelists.

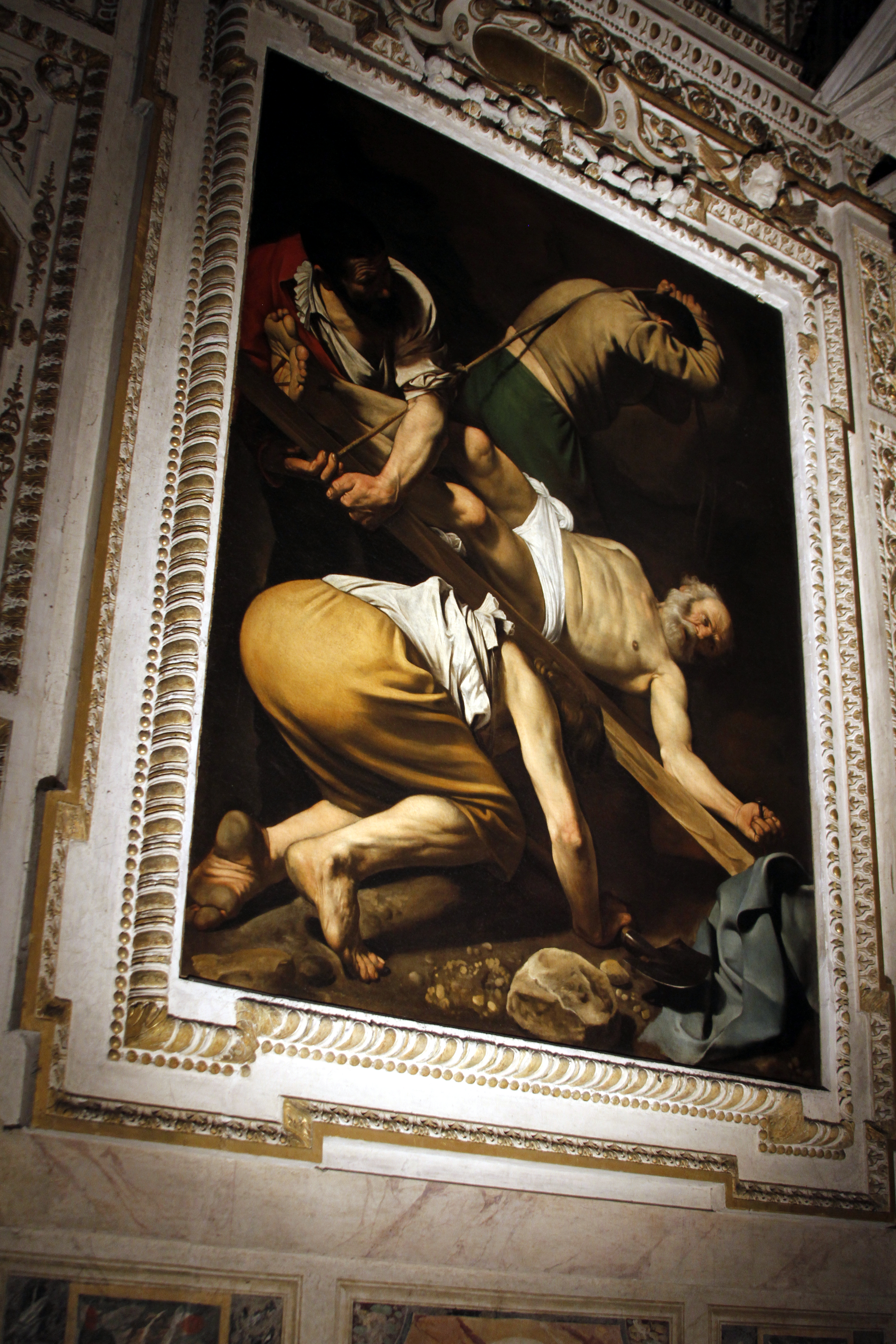
Left side wall

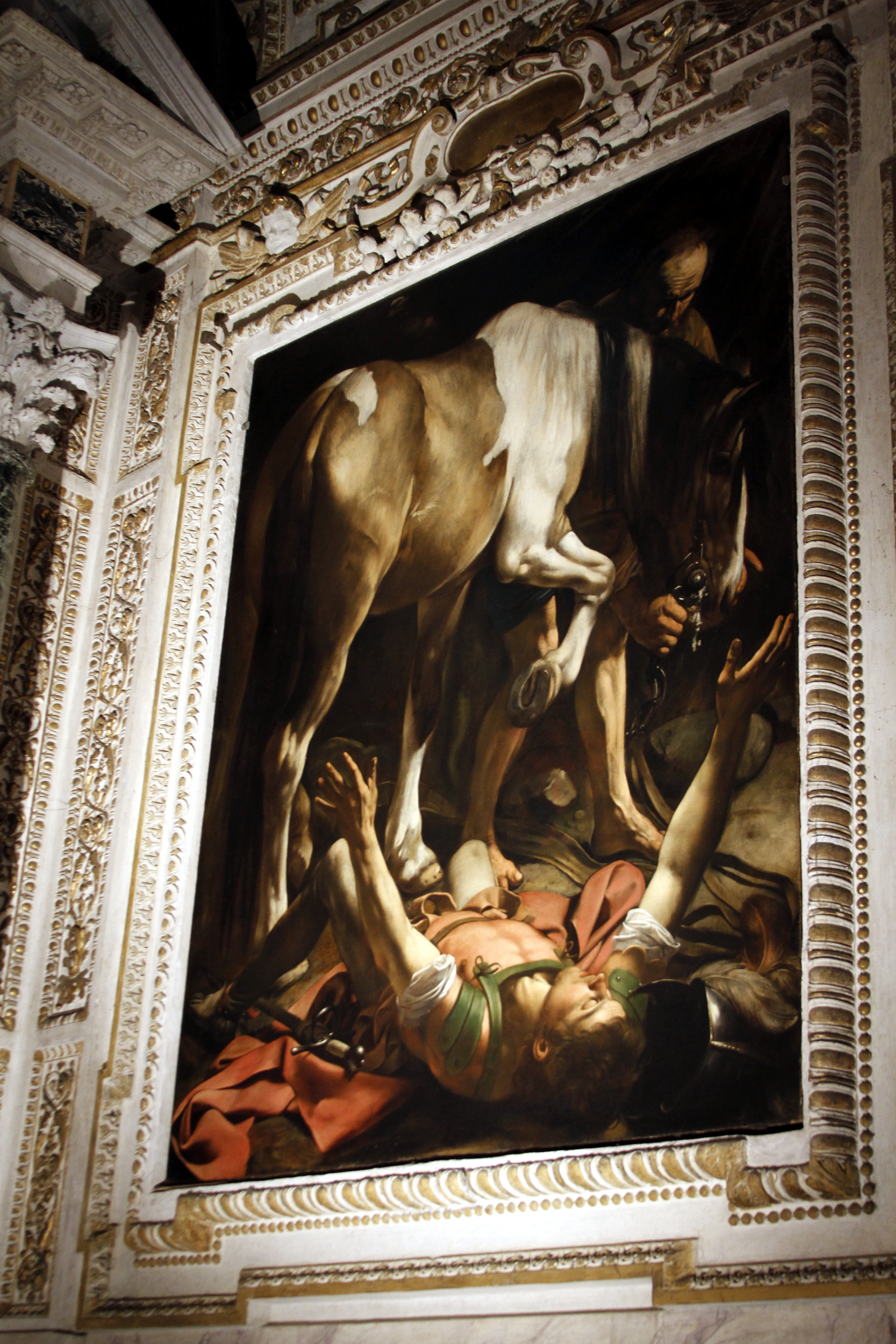
Right side wall

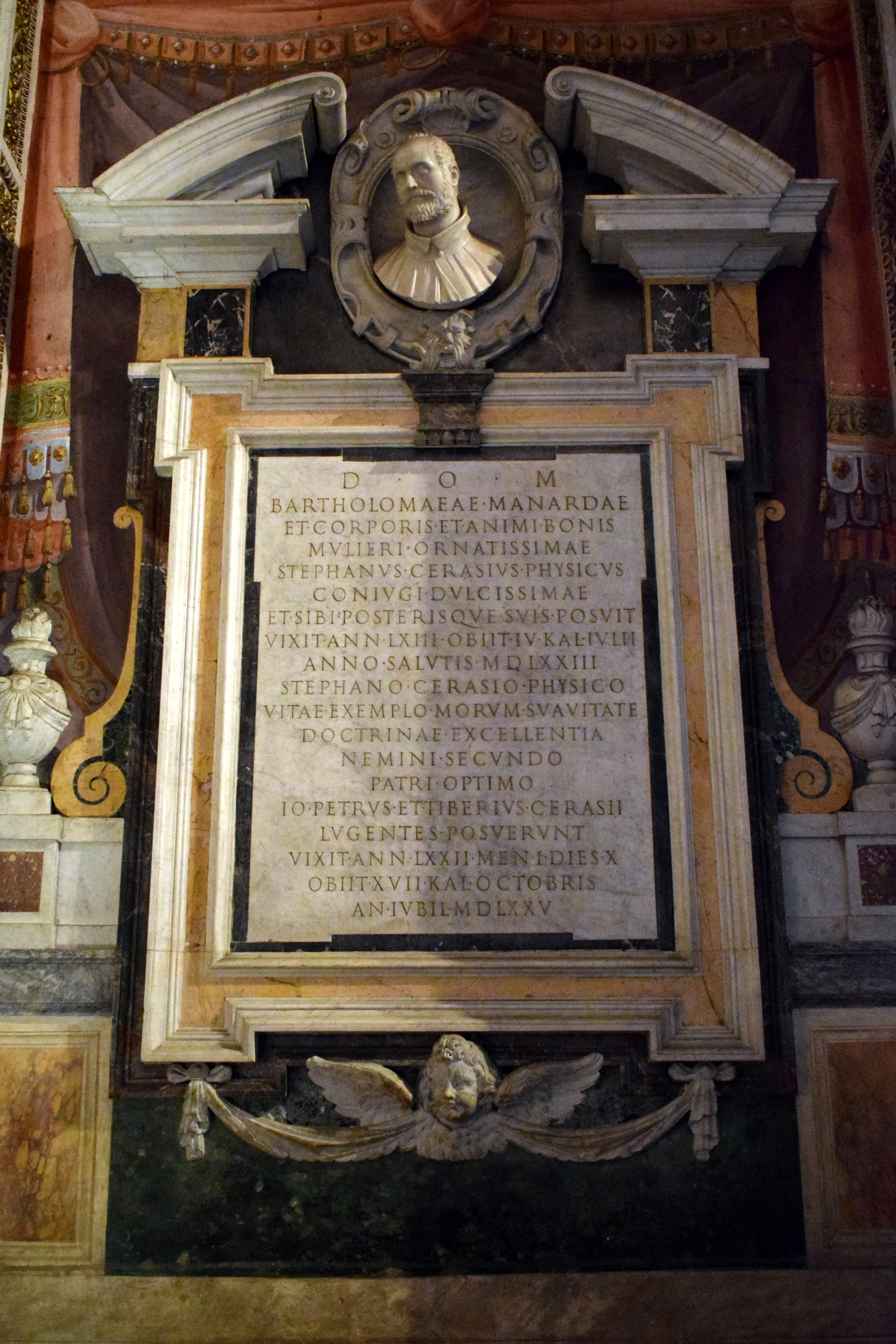
The monument of Stefano Cerasi

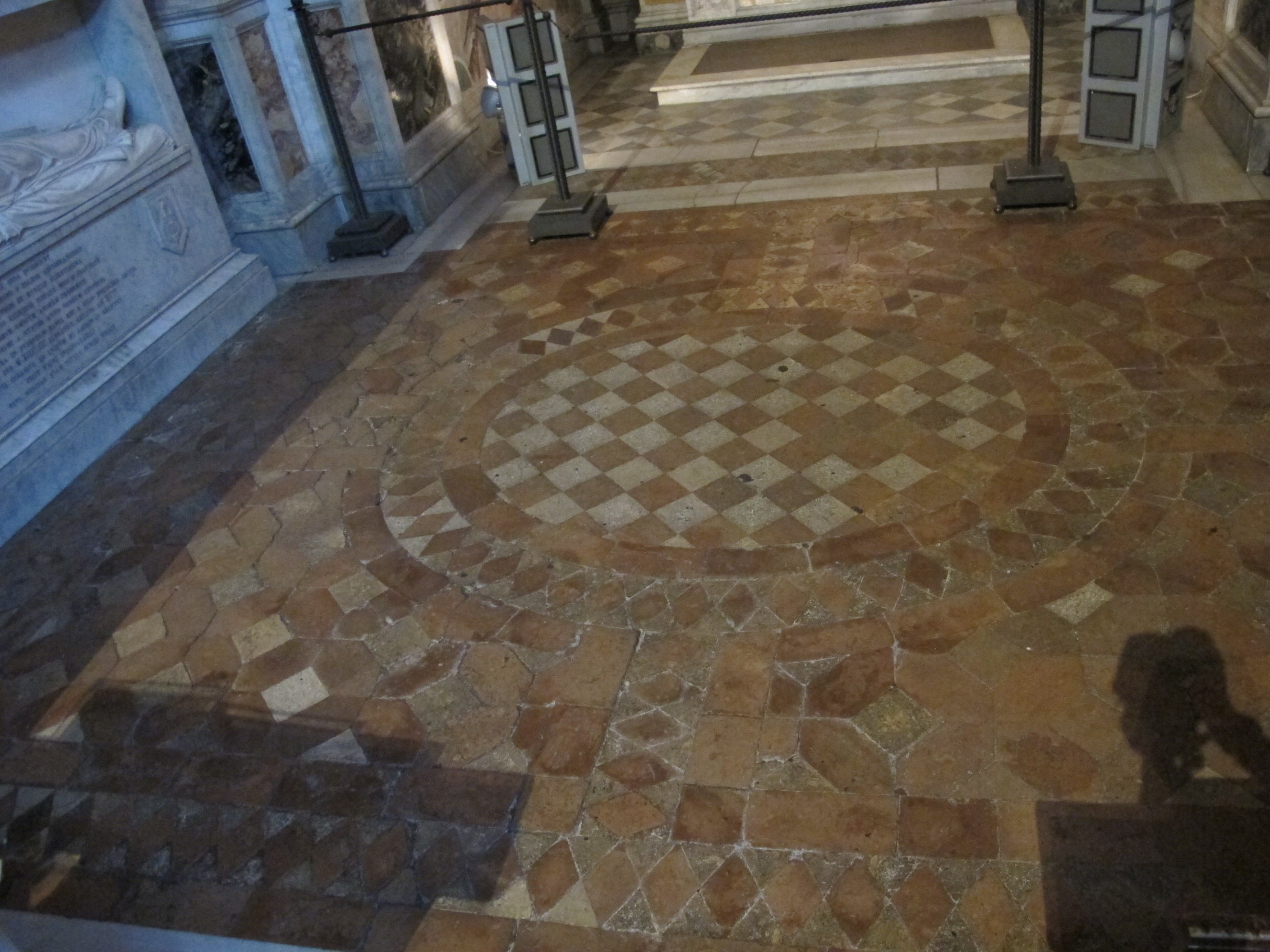
Pavement

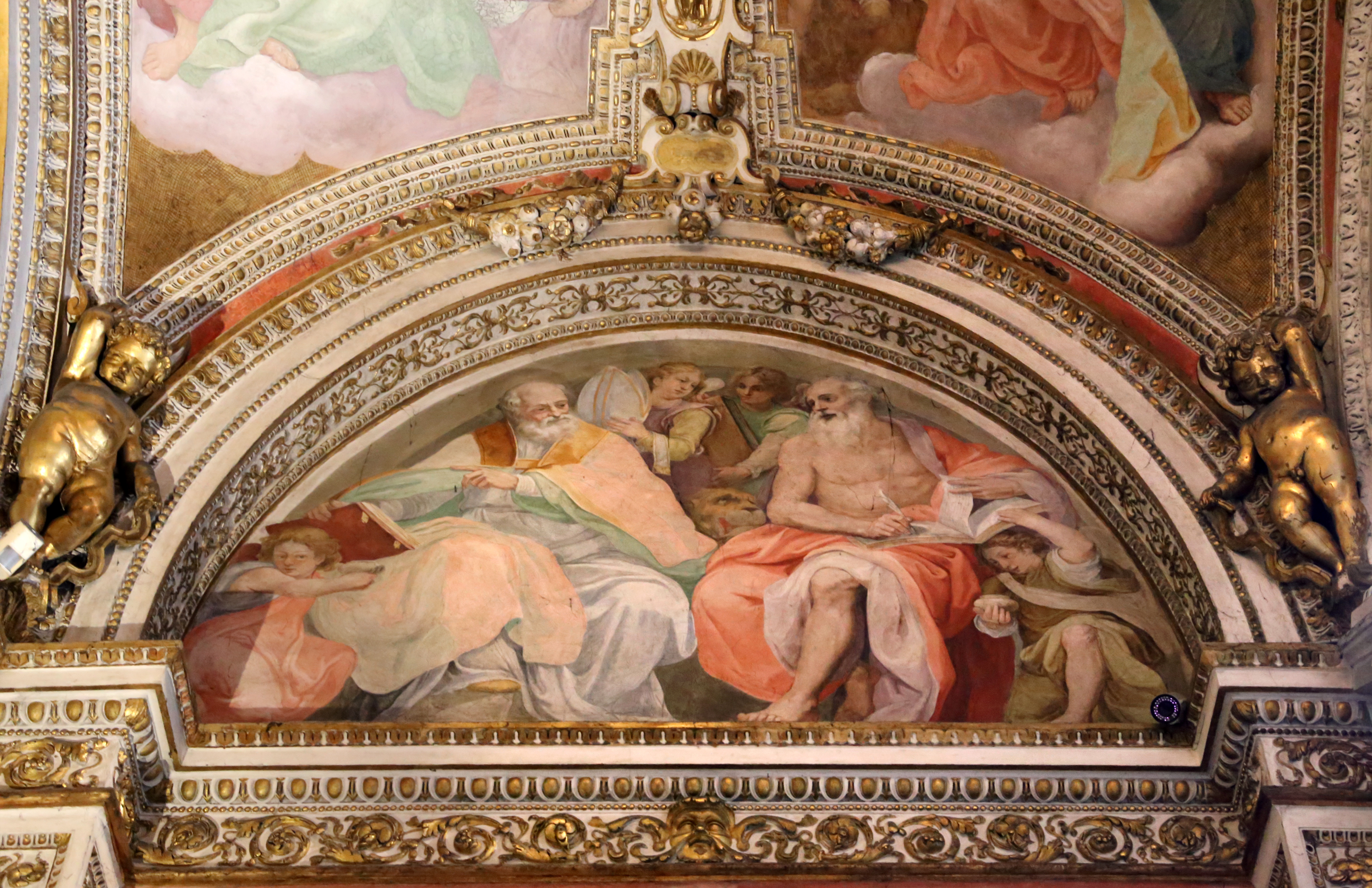
Saints Augustine and Jerome

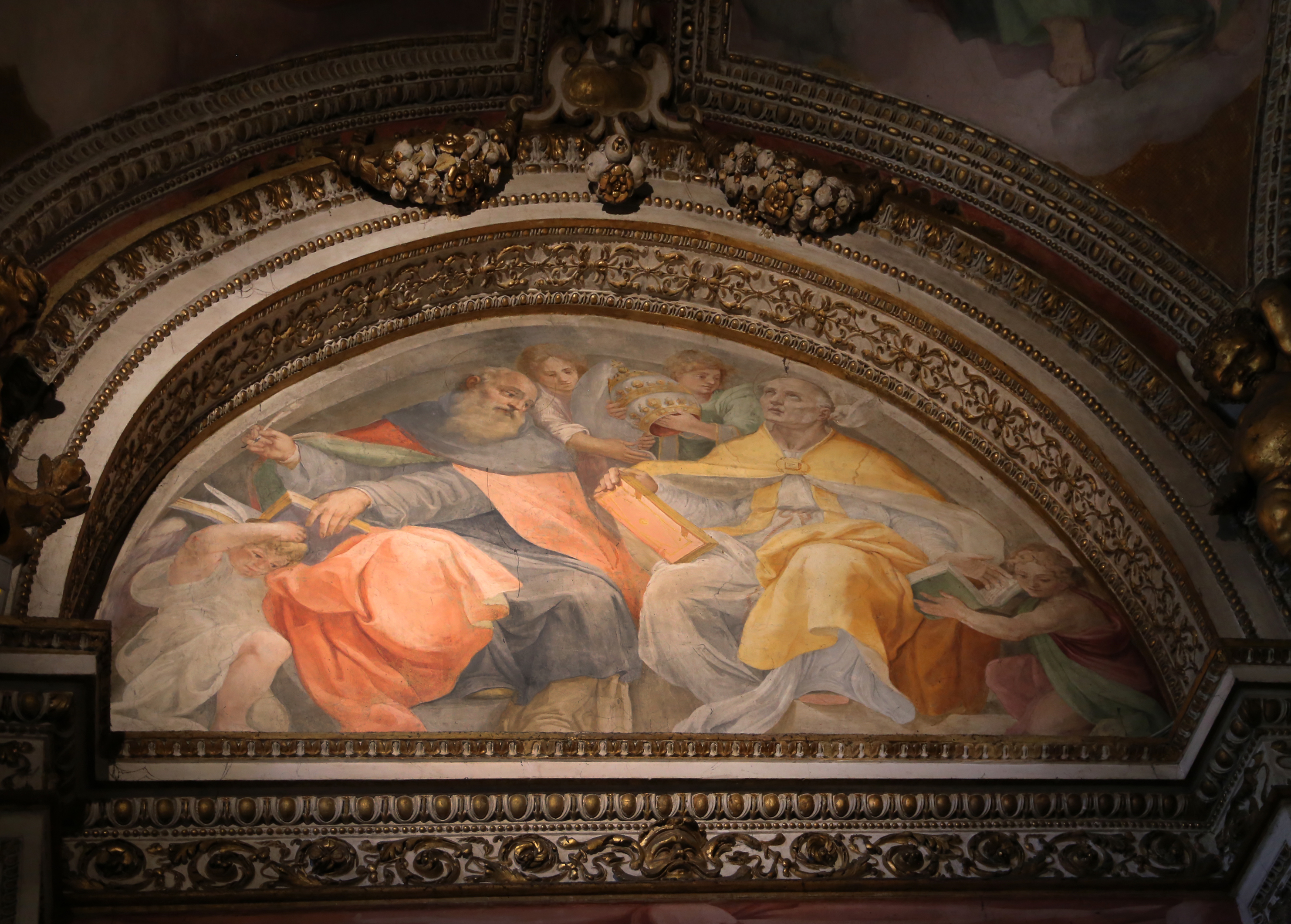
Saints Ambrose and Gregory the Great

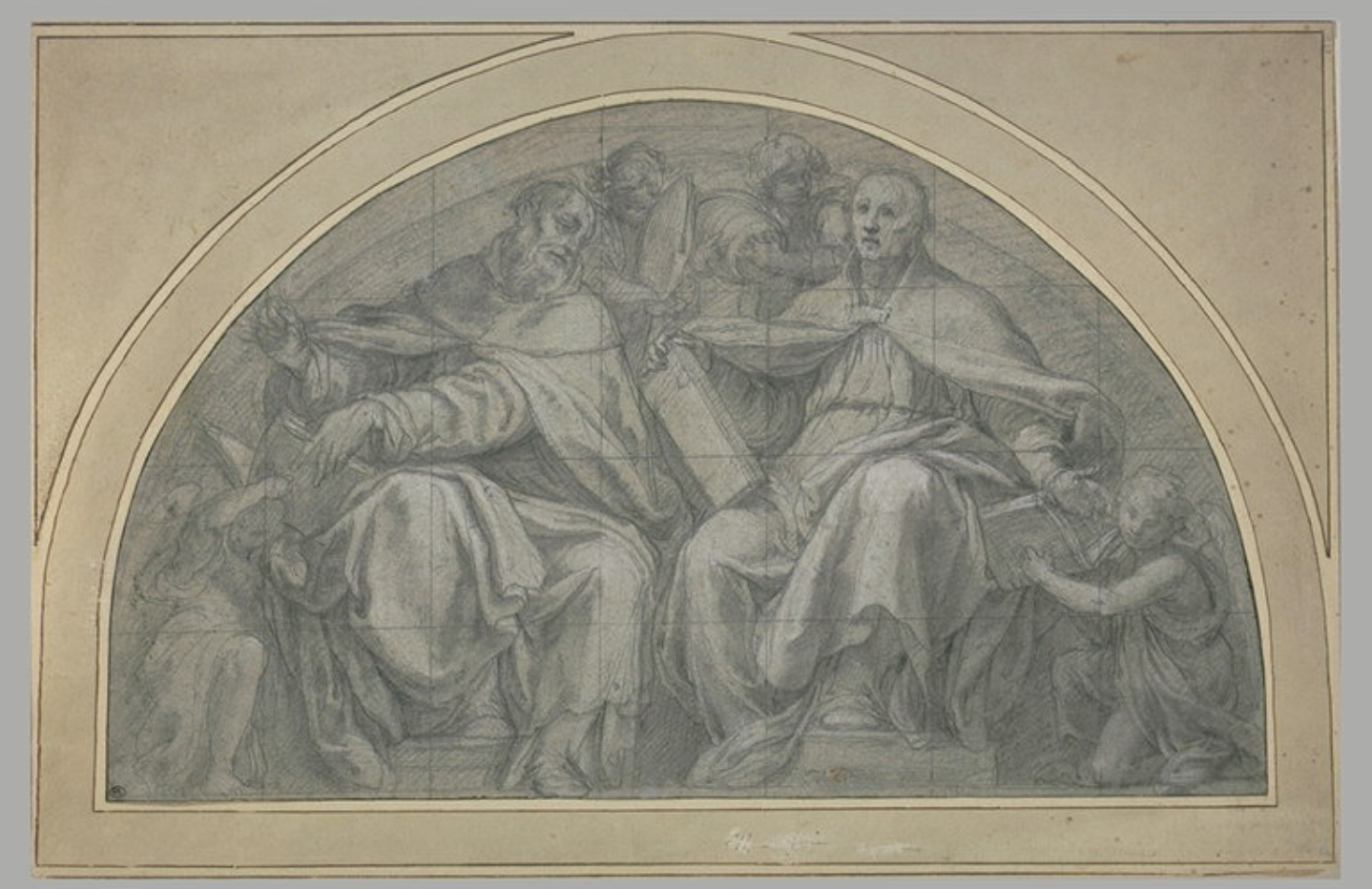
Preparatory study for a lunette painting

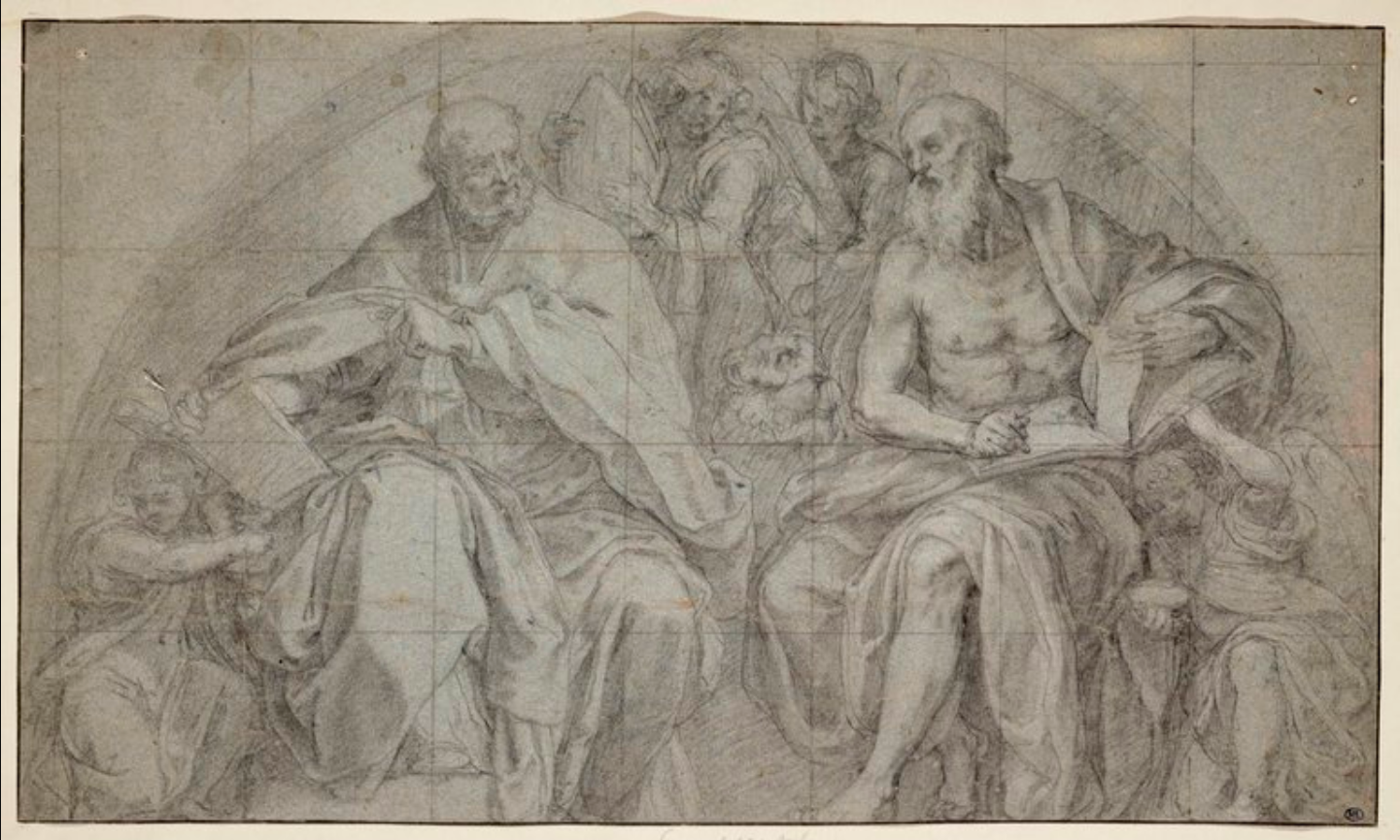
Preparatory study for a lunette painting

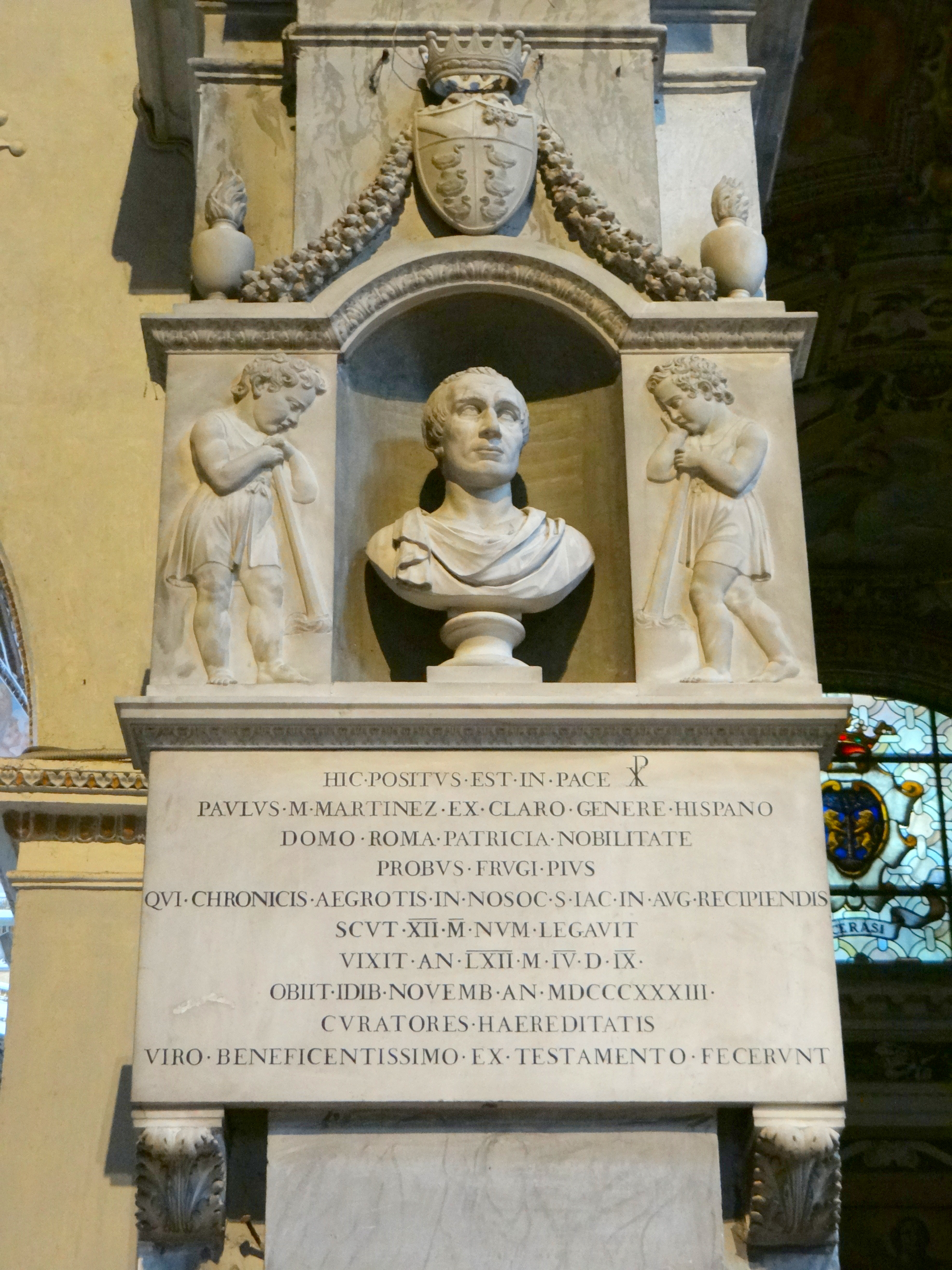
Monument of Paolo M. Martinez, benefactor (on external left pillar), whose tomb is in the chapel pavement

== Bibliography ==
- Leo Steinberg: Observations in the Cerasi Chapel, in: The Art Bulletin, Vol. 41, No. 2 (Jun., 1959), pp. 183–190
- Lilian H. Zirpolo: The A to Z of Renaissance Art, Scarecrow Press, 2008
- John L. Varriano: Caravaggio: The Art of Realism, Penn State University Press, 2006
- Christopher L. C. E. Witcombe: Two "Avvisi", Caravaggio, and Giulio Mancini, in: Source: Notes in the History of Art, Vol. 12, No. 3 (Spring 1993), pp. 22–29
- L. Spezzaferro, "La cappella Cerasi e il Caravaggio," in: Caravaggio, Carracci, Maderno. La Cappella Cerasi in S. Maria del Popolo a Roma (ed. L. Spezzaferro, M.G. Bernardini, C. Strinati, and A.M. Tantillo (Milan 2001), pp. 9–34.
- William Breazeale: «Un gran soggetto ma non ideale»: Caravaggio and Bellori's legacy, Kunsttexte.de. 1/2001
- William Breazeale: Il Caravaggio, il Carracci e la cappella Cerasi: eredità teorica e opinione moderna Firenze : Le Càriti, 2006.
- Heather Nolin: "Non piacquero al Padrone: A Reexamination of Caravaggio's Cerasi Crucifixion of St. Peter, in: Rutgers Art Review 24 (2008)
