= Advocates of Roman congregations =

Persons who plead causes before ecclesiastical tribunals in the Roman Curia

Advocates of Roman congregations are canon lawyers of the Catholic Church who practice in the Roman Curia, pleading cases before ecclesiastical tribunals.

These advocates may be priests or laypeople, as long as they are qualified by their familiarity with both canon and secular law.

== Nature and functioning ==
The learning required of these advocates is exceptional and profound. Besides a thorough acquaintance with jurisprudence, both canonical and civil, they must also be versed in moral and dogmatic theology, and in ecclesiastical and secular history. Frequent references to the councils and canons of the church and to the papal decrees oblige them to acquire a deep and varied erudition which embraces various languages, ancient and modern.

In several ways the advocate of the Roman Court differs from the ordinary legal pleader. In the first place, it is not his duty to establish the facts in a given case. That is the business of another official called the procurator. The advocate assumes the facts delivered to him by the procurator to be true, and on them he builds his legal argument. Dealing as he does directly with points of law and not with the question of establishing facts, he is freed from the temptation of suborning false witnesses or distorting testimony. Again, a Roman advocate pleads always before learned judges, so he cannot appeal to the passions or indulge in theatrical displays of eloquence, as if he had to deal with a jury. His language is expected to be sober and refined, clear and precise. Having stated plainly the facts in the case, he is required to state equally plainly the laws on which the decision depends. Very frequently the advocate's plea is made in writing.

The recompense of a Roman advocate is a fixed sum, which is to be paid by the client whether the case is gained or lost. There is no temptation, therefore, to proceed to questionable means to obtain a favorable verdict. Moreover, the consistorial advocates are pledged to defend the poor free of charge in case of need.

A Pious Society of Advocates exists at Rome whose officers divide the cases of the poor among the members.

Consistorial advocates proper were originally only seven in number, forming the Consistorial College. Sixtus IV added five more (called juniors), and this number of twelve was definitely fixed by Benedict XIV in 1744.

The other advocates are called titular or simple advocates.
