= 1588 =

1588 in various calendars
- Gregorian calendar: 1588; MDLXXXVIII
- Ab urbe condita: 2341
- Armenian calendar: 1037; ԹՎ ՌԼԷ
- Assyrian calendar: 6338
- Balinese saka calendar: 1509–1510
- Bengali calendar: 994–995
- Berber calendar: 2538
- English Regnal year: 30 Eliz. 1 – 31 Eliz. 1
- Buddhist calendar: 2132
- Burmese calendar: 950
- Byzantine calendar: 7096–7097
- Chinese calendar: 丁亥年 (Fire Pig); 4285 or 4078 — to — 戊子年 (Earth Rat); 4286 or 4079
- Coptic calendar: 1304–1305
- Discordian calendar: 2754
- Ethiopian calendar: 1580–1581
- Hebrew calendar: 5348–5349
- Hindu calendars
- Vikram Samvat: 1644–1645
- Shaka Samvat: 1509–1510
- Kali Yuga: 4688–4689
- Holocene calendar: 11588
- Igbo calendar: 588–589
- Iranian calendar: 966–967
- Islamic calendar: 996–997
- Japanese calendar: Tenshō 16 (天正１６年)
- Javanese calendar: 1507–1509
- Julian calendar: Gregorian minus 10 days
- Korean calendar: 3921
- Minguo calendar: 324 before ROC 民前324年
- Nanakshahi calendar: 120
- Thai solar calendar: 2130–2131
- Tibetan calendar: མེ་མོ་ཕག་ལོ་ (female Fire-Boar); 1714 or 1333 or 561 — to — ས་ཕོ་བྱི་བ་ལོ་ (male Earth-Rat); 1715 or 1334 or 562

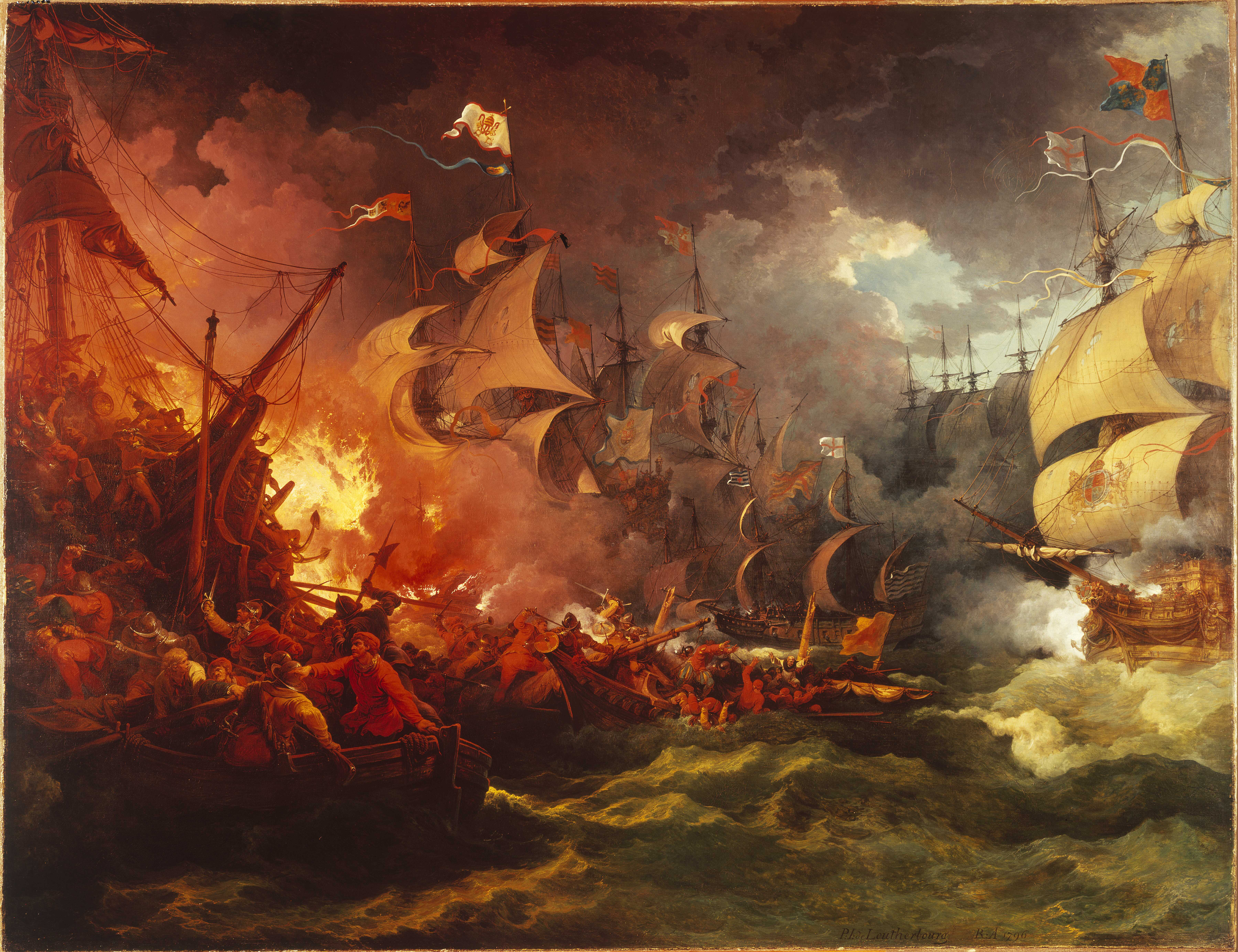
August 8: The English Navy defeats the invading Spanish Armada in the Battle of Gravelines.

1588 (MDLXXXVIII) was a leap year starting on Friday of the Gregorian calendar and a leap year starting on Monday of the Julian calendar, the 1588th year of the Common Era (CE) and Anno Domini (AD) designations, the 588th year of the 2nd millennium, the 88th year of the 16th century, and the 9th year of the 1580s decade. As of the start of 1588, the Gregorian calendar was 10 days ahead of the Julian calendar, which remained in localized use until 1923.

== Events ==
=== January–March ===
- January 22 – Pope Sixtus V issues the papal bull Immensa aeterni Dei, a major reorganization of the Roman Curia creating 15 congregations of cardinals, including the Congregation of the Index Librorum Prohibitorum, the Church list of forbidden books; the Congregation of the Inquisition; and the Congregation of the Vatican Press.
- January 24 – War of the Polish Succession: The Battle of Pitschen takes place at Pitschen (modern Byczyna in Poland) with Polish and Lithuanian troops commanded by the Polish hetman Jan Zamoyski defending against an invading Austrian force commanded by Maximilian III, Archduke of Austria. After his army is routed, Archduke Maximilian surrenders and is taken as a prisoner of war, and will be held for more than a year until his release is compelled by the intervention of Pope Sixtus V.
- February 9 – The sudden death of Álvaro de Bazán, 1st Marquis of Santa Cruz, in the midst of preparations for the Spanish Armada, forces King Philip II of Spain to re-allocate the command of the fleet.
- February 18 – In modern-day Sri Lanka, the siege of Colombo by King Rajasinha I of Sitawaka ends when Portuguese Admiral Pedro Teixeira arrives with a fleet of 80 ships and frees the capital of Portuguese Ceylon. King Rajasinha and his troops flee back to his capital at Seethawakapura.
- March 20 – The ascension of Shah Abbas I as Emperor in Iran, of the Safavid Empire, is made official on the first day of the New Year on the Zoroastrian Calendar. Abbas has ruled since October 16, 1587.
- March 25 – The English Army begins the recruitment of volunteers to prepare for the expected invasion by Spain. On April 10, 1593, the English Parliament will enact the first military pension, "An Acte for relief of Soudiours", providing that "forasmuch as it is agreable with Christian Charity Policy and the Honor of our Nation, that shuch as have since the 25th day of March 1588, adventured their lives and lost their limbs or disabled their bodies, or shall hereafter adventure the lives, lose their limbs or disable their bodies, in defence and service of Her Majesty and the State, should at their return be relieved and rewarded to the end that they may reap the fruit of their good deservings, and others may be encouraged to perform like endeavors..."

=== April–June ===
- April 4 – Christian IV becomes king of Denmark–Norway, upon the death of his father, Frederick II.
- May 12 – Day of the Barricades in Paris: Henry I, Duke of Guise seizes the city, forcing King Henry III to flee.
- May 28 – The Spanish Armada, with 130 ships and 30,000 men, begins to set sail from the Tagus estuary, under the command of the Duke of Medina Sedonia and Juan Martínez de Recalde, heading for the English Channel (it will take until May 30 for all of the ships to leave port).
- June 18 – Sailing across the South Atlantic Ocean towards England, near the end of their voyage around the world, Thomas Cavendish and his East India Company fleet stumble across the Portuguese-controlled island of Saint Helena. While Saint Helena has been under the control of Portugal for 80 years, England had been unaware of its existence.
- June 19 – Twenty days after departing from Spain, the Spanish Armada receives a foreshadowing of disaster to come during the summer as a storm scatters part of the fleet, postponing the invasion. Alonso de Guzmán y Sotomayor, Duke of Medina Sidonia and commander of the Spanish expedition, returns the fleet to the port of Coruna for repairs, and writes a letter to King Philip, urging him to abandon plans for invasion of England, and to reach an honorable settlement, but the King refuses. The Spanish expedition resumes on July 21.

=== July–September ===
- July 15 – At Rouen, King Henry III of France gives in to the latest demands of the Catholic League and the Duke of Guise, and signs the Edict of Union, agreeing not to allow French Protestants to participate in government, in return for being able to return to Paris.
- July 31 – The first engagement between the English and Spanish fleets (off Plymouth) results in a victory for the English, under command of Lord Howard of Effingham and Sir Francis Drake.
- August 2 – The English fleet defeats the Spanish fleet, off the Isle of Portland.
- August 7 – The English fleet defeats the Spanish fleet off the coast of Flanders.
- August 8 (July 29 Old Style) – Battle of Gravelines: The Spanish Armada is defeated by the English naval force off the coast of Gravelines, in the Spanish Netherlands (modern France).
- August 9 – The Duke of Medina Sidonia, commander of the Spanish Armada, decides to return the fleet to Spain after two days of trying to reach the coast of Flanders to meet up with the army of the Duke of Parma.
- August 12 – The fleeing Spanish Armada sails past the Firth of Forth, and the English call off their pursuit, entirely avoiding the storm which destroys most of the Spanish fleet as it attempts to round Scotland and the west coast of Ireland.
- August 19 (August 9 Old Style) – Speech to the Troops at Tilbury by Queen Elizabeth I.
- August 29 (8th day of the 7th month, Tensho 16) – In Japan, the Chancellor of the Realm, Toyotomi Hideyoshi, issues an edict for the katanagari (the sword hunt), the confiscation of swords from any persons thought to be opposed to his rule.
- September 1 – The Ganja Fortress in modern-day Azerbaijan is captured by Ottoman general Serdar Ferhad Pasha.
- September 9 – English captain Thomas Cavendish completes his circumnavigation in a record time of 781 days, returning to Plymouth more than two years after setting off on July 21, 1586. The previous record had been 1,018 days by the expedition of Sir Francis Drake from 1577 to 1580. By the time of his return, Cavendish has only his flagship, Desire, after having started with two other vessels (the warship Content and the 40-ton supply ship Hugh Gallant).
- September 13 – Dutch General Charles III de Croÿ captures the German city of Bonn in the Electorate of Cologne.

=== October–December ===
- October 7 – The first biography of Nicolaus Copernicus (d.1543) is completed by Bernardino Baldi.
- November 13 – Dutch Republic and English forces capture Bergen op Zoom, a fortress in the Spanish Netherlands, after a siege of 41 days.
- November 15 – The English Navy ship Great Spaniard, formerly the Spanish Armada ship San Salvador until its capture on August 1, sinks off of the coast of England's Isle of Purbeck, with the loss of 23 of the 57 crew. The survivors are rescued by an English man-o-war boat.
- December 5 – The Order of Augustinian Recollects is formally recognised as a separate province from the Order of Saint Augustine, an event later known as the Día de la Recolección or Day of Recollection.
- December 23 – Henry III of France strikes his ultra-Catholic enemies, having the Duke of Guise and his brother, Louis II de Lorraine, cardinal de Guise, killed, and holding the Cardinal de Bourbon a prisoner. As a result, large parts of France reject Henry III as their king, forcing him to side with Henry of Navarre.

=== Unknown ===
- William Morgan's Welsh translation of the Bible is published.
- The Armada Portrait of Elizabeth I of England is created, to celebrate the English defeat of the Spanish Armada, and to assert the strength of Elizabeth herself.

== Births ==
=== January–June ===
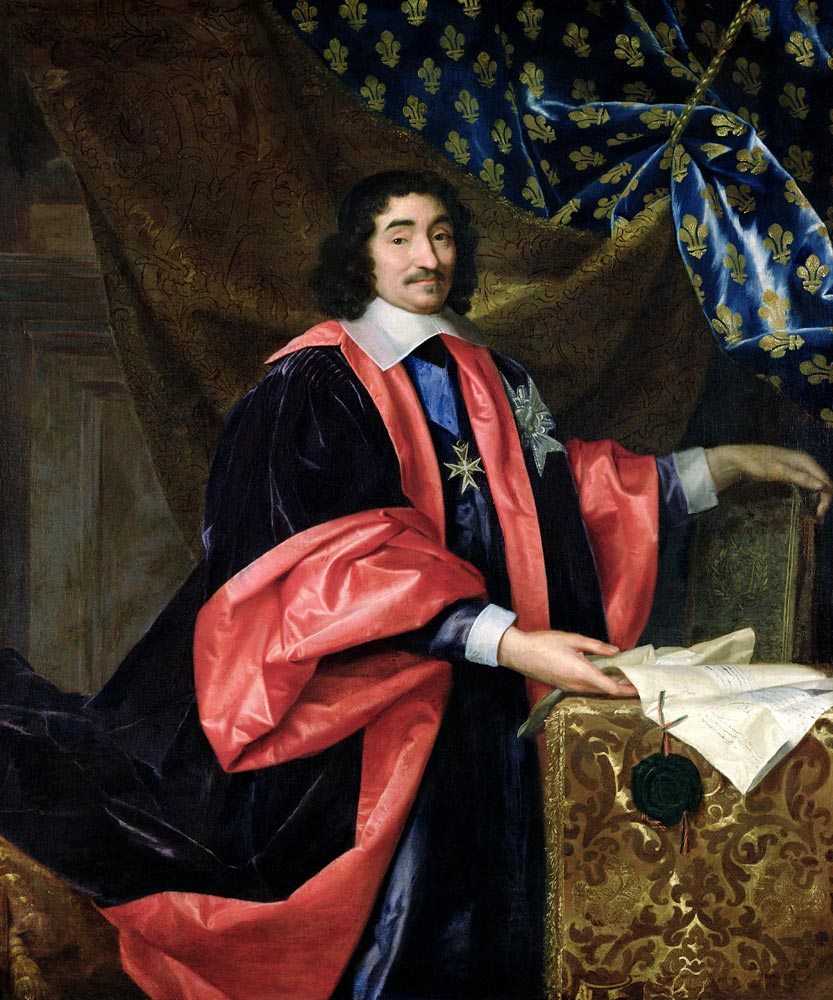
Pierre Seguier

- January 4 – Arnold Vinnius, Dutch lawyer (d. 1657)
- January 6 – Elizabeth Stanley, Countess of Huntingdon, English noblewoman and writer (d. 1633)
- January 20 – Francesco Gessi, Italian painter (d. 1649)
- February 2 – Georg II of Fleckenstein-Dagstuhl, German nobleman (d. 1644)
- February 15 – Benjamin Bramer, German mathematician (d. 1652)
- March 12 – Herman de Neyt, Flemish painter (d. 1642)
- March 21 – Egon VIII of Fürstenberg-Heiligenberg, Bavarian count and field-marshal (d. 1635)
- March 22 – Frederick IX, Margrave of Brandenburg, Grand Master of the Order of Saint John (d. 1611)
- March 27 – Celestyn Myślenta, Polish theologian (d. 1653)
- March 29 – Margherita Aldobrandini, Parmesan regent (d. 1646)
- March – Johann Heinrich Alsted, German theologian (d. 1638)
- April 4 – Padovanino, Italian painter (d. 1649)
- April 5 – Thomas Hobbes, English philosopher (d. 1679)
- April 15 – Claudius Salmasius, French classical scholar (d. 1653)
- April 16 – Emanuel Filibert of Savoy, Viceroy of Sicily (d. 1624)
- May 2 – Étienne Pascal, French mathematician (d. 1651)
- May 9 – Herman Hugo, Jesuit priest, writer, military chaplain (d. 1629)
- May 13 – Ole Worm, Danish physician and antiquary (d. 1654)
- May 28 – Pierre Séguier, Chancellor of France (d. 1672)
- June 3 – Julius Frederick, Duke of Württemberg-Weiltingen (1617–16135) (d. 1635)
- June 9 – Johann Andreas Herbst, German composer and music theorist (d. 1666)
- June 11 – George Wither, English poet and satirist (d. 1667)
- June 14 – Hoshina Masasada, Japanese daimyō who ruled the Ino Domain (d. 1661)
- June 30 – Giovanni Maria Sabino, Italian composer, organist and teacher (d. 1649)

=== July–December ===
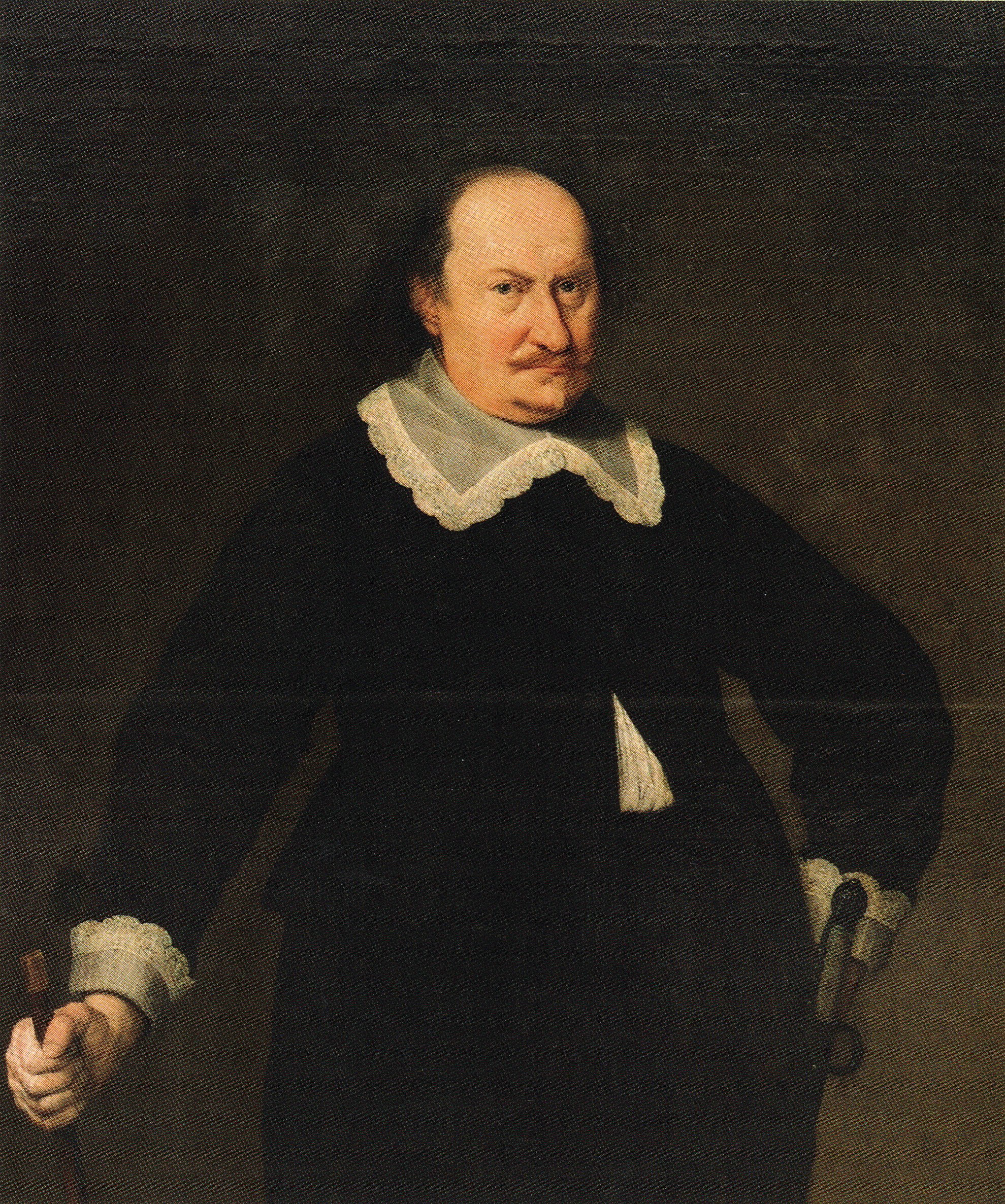
Adolf Frederick I, Duke of Mecklenburg

- July 7 – Wolrad IV, Count of Waldeck-Eisenberg (1588–1640) (d. 1640)
- July 29 – William Spring of Pakenham, Member of Parliament (d. 1638)
- August 25 – Elizabeth Poole, English settler in Plymouth Colony (d. 1654)
- August – François de La Mothe Le Vayer, French writer (d. 1672)
- September 1 – Henri, Prince of Condé (d. 1646)
- September 8 – Marin Mersenne, French theologian (d. 1648)
- September 10 – Nicholas Lanier, English composer (d. 1666)
- September 13 – Edward Vaux, 4th Baron Vaux of Harrowden, English baron (d. 1661)
- October 7 – Sir Drue Drury, 1st Baronet, English politician (d. 1632)
- October 16 – Luke Wadding, Irish Franciscan friar and historian (d. 1657)
- October 17 – Matthias Gallas, Austrian soldier (d. 1647)
- November 25 – Gilbert Ironside the elder, English bishop (d. 1671)
- December 10
  - Johann von Aldringen, Austrian field marshal (d. 1634)
  - Isaac Beeckman, Dutch philosopher and scientist (d. 1637)
- December 15
  - Charles de Condren, French theologian (d. 1641)
  - Adolf Frederick I, Duke of Mecklenburg-Schwerin (1592–1628 and again 1631–1658) (d. 1658)
- December 23 – Claude Bernard, French priest (d. 1641)
- December 24 – Constance of Austria, Queen of Poland (d. 1631)

=== Date unknown ===
- John Danvers, English politician (d. 1655)
- John Endecott, English politician (d. 1665)
- Robert Filmer, English political writer (d. 1653)
- Accepted Frewen, English churchman (d. 1664)
- Madame Ke, influential nanny of the Tianqi Emperor of China (approximately; d. 1627)
- Francis Higginson, colonial American Puritan (d. 1630)
- Jan Janssonius, Dutch cartographer (d. 1664)
- Catherine de Vivonne, marquise de Rambouillet (d. 1665)
- John Winthrop, influential Puritan in the history of Massachusetts (d. 1649)

== Deaths ==
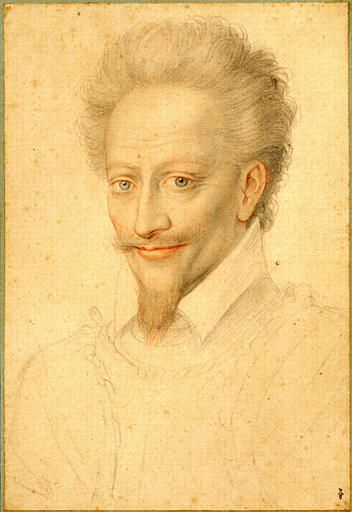
Henri, Prince of Conde

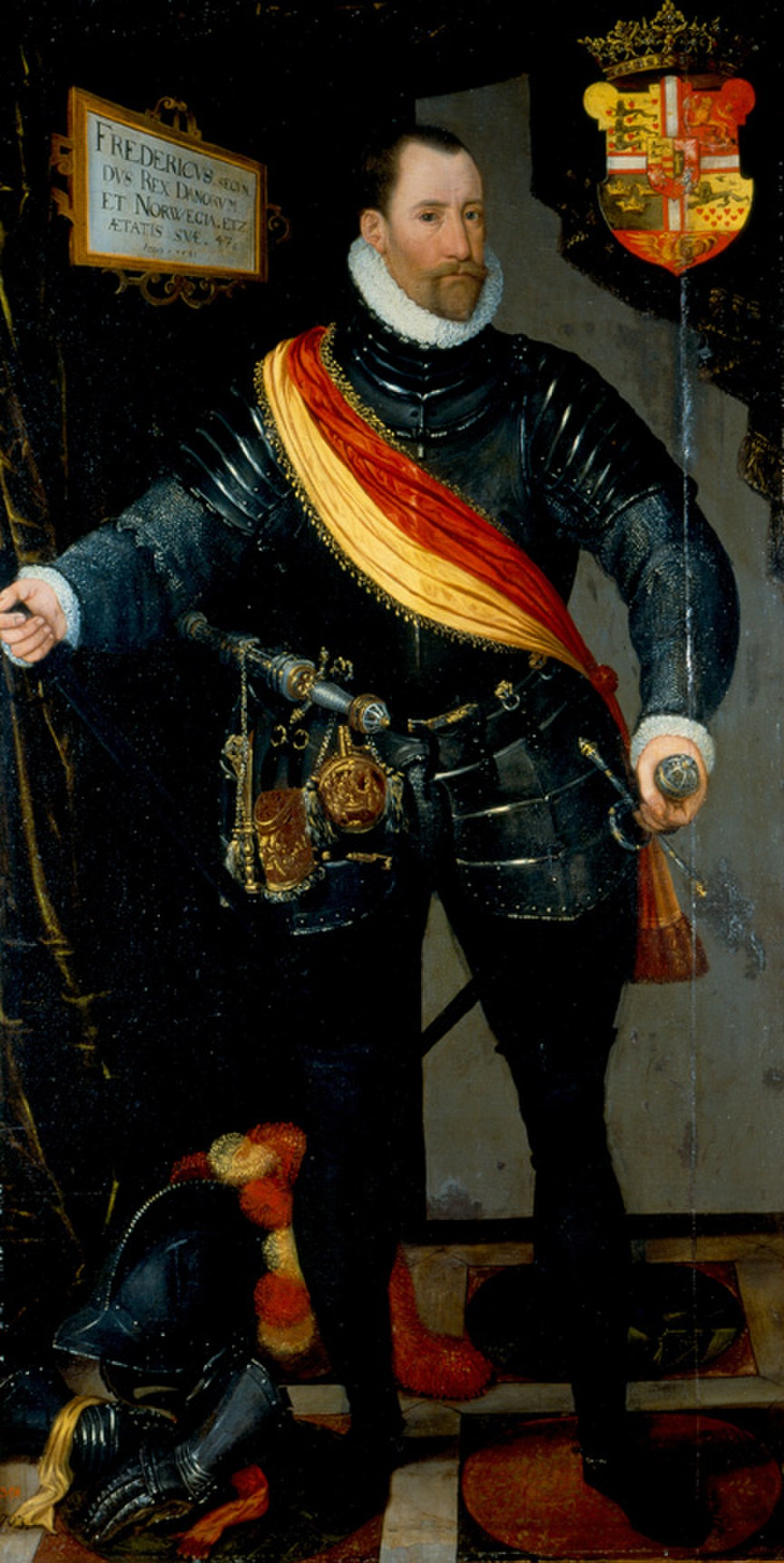
King Frederick II of Denmark

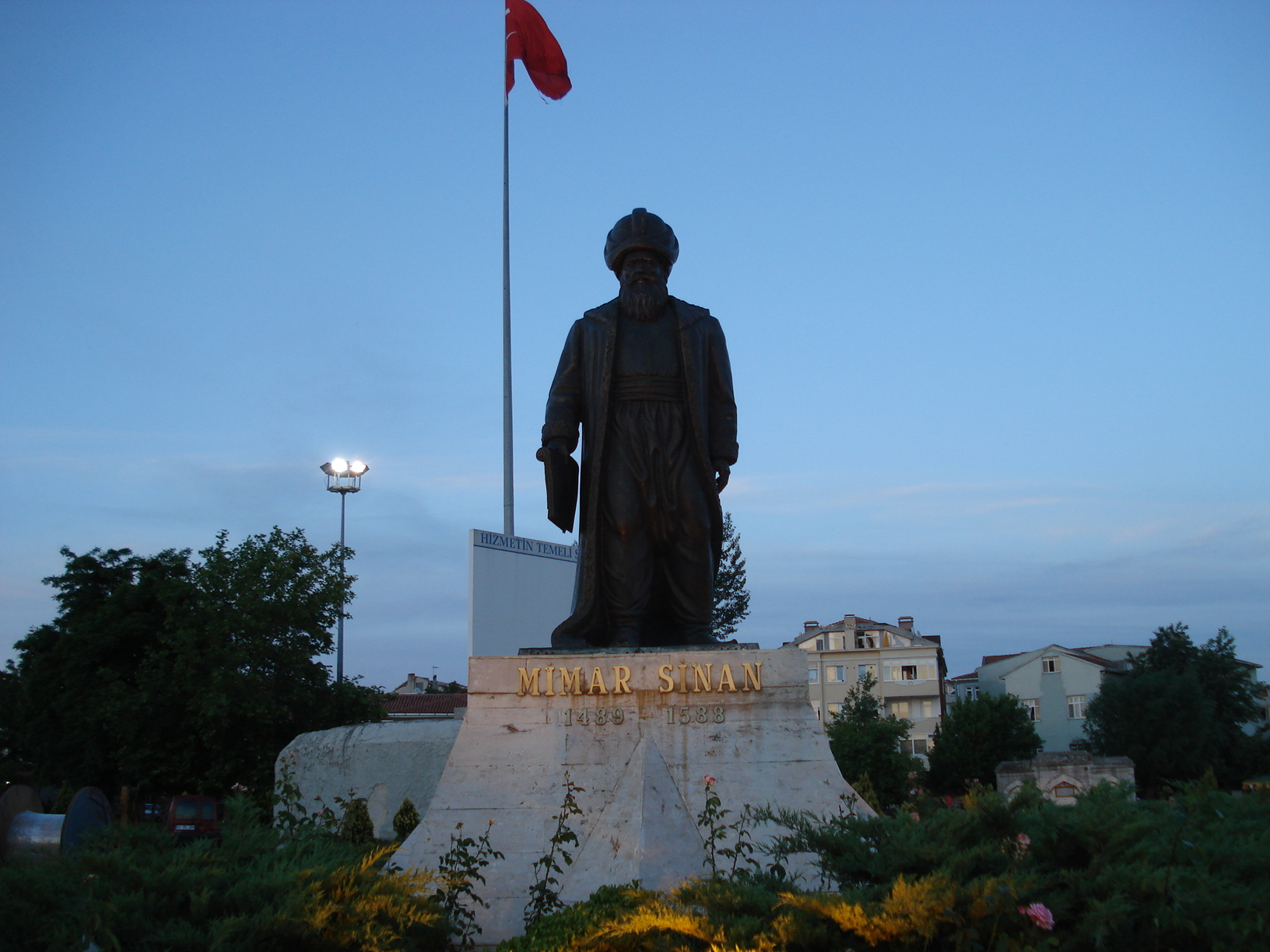
Mimar Sinan

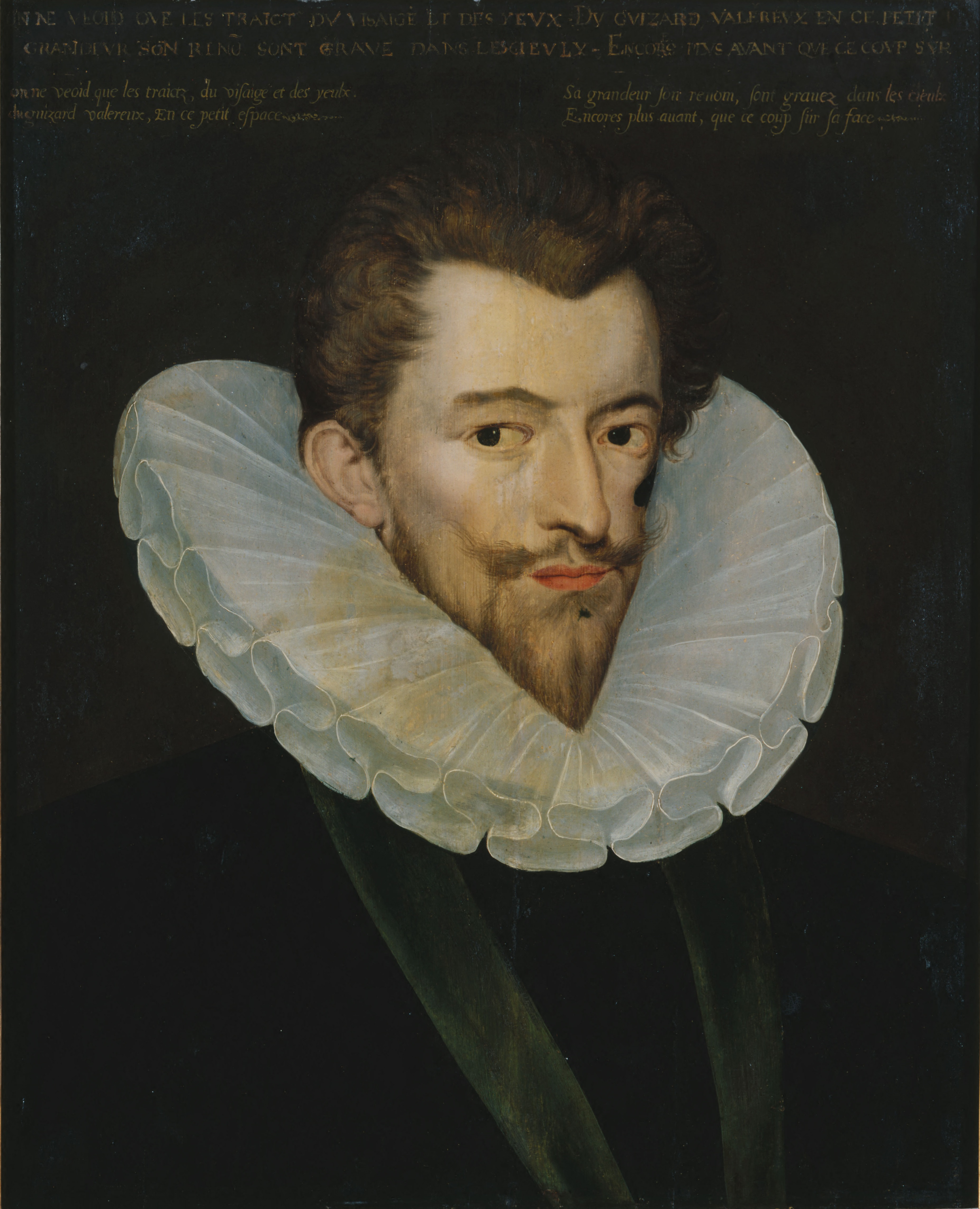
Henry I, Duke of Guise

- January 17 – Qi Jiguang, Chinese general (b. 1528)
- February 9 – Álvaro de Bazán, 1st Marquis of Santa Cruz, Spanish admiral (b. 1526)
- February 24 – Johann Weyer, Dutch physician and occultist (b. 1515)
- March 3 – Henry XI of Legnica, Duke of Legnica (b. 1539)
- March 5 – Henri, Prince of Condé (b. 1552)
- March 10 – Theodor Zwinger, Swiss scholar (b. 1533)
- April 4 – King Frederick II of Denmark (b. 1534)
- April 19 – Paolo Veronese, Italian painter (b. c. 1528)
- May 5 – Giorgio Biandrata, Italian physician (b. 1515)
- May 12 – Peter Monau, German physician (b. 1551)
- June 5 – Anne Cecil, Countess of Oxford, English countess (b. 1556)
- June 7 – Philip II, Margrave of Baden-Baden (b. 1559)
- June 10 – Valentin Weigel, German theologian (b. 1533).
- June 13 – Countess Anna of Nassau (b. 1563)
- June 18 – Robert Crowley, London stationer (b. 1517)
- July 17 – Mimar Sinan, Ottoman architect (b. 1489)
- August 6 – Josias I, Count of Waldeck-Eisenberg, Count of Waldeck-Eisenberg (1578-1588) (b. 1554)
- August 8 – Alonso Sánchez Coello, Spanish painter (b. c. 1531)
- August 12 – Alfonso Ferrabosco the elder, Italian composer (b. 1543)
- August 30 – Margaret Ward, English saint (birthdate unknown)
- August 31 – Juliana of Nassau-Dillenburg, Dutch prince (b. 1546)
- September 3 – Richard Tarlton, English actor (b. 1530)
- September 4 – Robert Dudley, 1st Earl of Leicester, English politician (b. 1532)
- September 25 – Tilemann Heshusius, German Gnesio-Lutheran theologian (b. 1527)
- September 26 – Amias Paulet, Governor of Jersey (b. 1532)
- October 1 – Edward James, English Catholic martyr (executed at Chichester)
- October 2 – Bernardino Telesio, Italian philosopher and natural scientist (b. 1509)
- October 23 – Juan Martínez de Recalde, Spanish admiral (b. c. 1540)
- November 1 – Jean Daurat, French poet and scholar (b. 1508)
- December 19 – Esther Handali, Ottoman businessperson
- December 23 – Henry I, Duke of Guise, French Catholic leader (b. 1550)
- December 24 – Louis II, Cardinal of Guise, French Catholic cardinal (b. 1555)
- date unknown
  - Diego Durán, Dominican friar and historian in colonial Mexico (b. c. 1537).
  - John Field, British Puritan clergyman and controversialist (b. 1545)
  - Sonam Gyatso, 3rd Dalai Lama, the first Dalai Lama to use the title (b. 1543)
  - Plautilla Nelli, Italian painter (b. 1524)
  - Edwin Sandys, English prelate (b. 1519)
  - Kenau Simonsdochter Hasselaer, Dutch war heroine (b. 1526)
