= The Martyrdom of Saint Andrew =

The Martyrdom or Crucifixion of Saint Andrew refers to the death of Andrew the Apostle.

It may also refer to:

- The Crucifixion of Saint Andrew (Caravaggio)
- Crucifixion of Saint Andrew (Damaskinos)
- The Martyrdom of Saint Andrew (Murillo)
- The Martyrdom of Saint Andrew (Ribera)
- The Martyrdom of Saint Andrew (Rubens)

== See also ==
- Saint Andrew (disambiguation)
- Saint Andrew's Cross (disambiguation)
- Crucifixion of Saint Peter (disambiguation)
