= Congregation (Roman Curia) =

Type of department of the Catholic Church's Curia

In the Roman Curia of the Catholic Church, a congregation (Latin: Sacræ Cardinalium Congregationes) was a type of department. They were second-highest-ranking departments, ranking below the two Secretariats, and above the pontifical councils, pontifical commissions, tribunals and offices.

Originally, congregations were select groups of cardinals drawn from the College of Cardinals, commissioned to take care of some field of activity that concerned the Holy See. After the Second Vatican Council, members included diocesan bishops from diverse parts of the world who are not cardinals. Each congregation also had a permanent staff.

Each congregation was led by a prefect, who is usually a cardinal. A non-cardinal appointed to head a congregation was styled pro-prefect until made a cardinal. This practice was later abandoned.

Under the reforms of Pope Francis, the congregations were each turned into what are now known as dicasteries.

== History and functioning ==
Certain curial departments have been organized by the Holy See at various times to assist it in the transaction of those affairs which canonical discipline and the individual interests of the faithful bring to Rome. Among the most important were the Roman Congregations, traditionally comprising cardinals who assist the pope in the administration of the affairs of the Church.

The Roman Congregations originated from the necessity, felt from the beginning, of studying the questions submitted for pontifical decision, in order to sift the legal questions arising and to establish matters of fact. Ecclesiastical business used to be handled by the pontifical chancery. This work, at first entrusted to the papal chaplains, was afterwards divided between the penitentiarii and the auditores, according as questions of the internal or the external forum (i.e., jurisdiction) were to be considered. Thereafter, cardinals in greater or less number were associated with them. Often, however, they were not merely entrusted with the preparation of the case, but were given authority to decide it. However, the ever-growing number of business items and the ever-increasing complexity of the issues necessitated the creation of separate, specialised administrative-legislative bodies (the administrative and legislative functions of ecclesiastical government are not as sharply separated in the Catholic Church as in a secular government with the separation of powers).

Pope Sixtus V was the first to distribute this administrative business among different congregations of cardinals; and in his apostolic constitution Immensa Aeterni Dei (22 January 1588) he generalized the idea, already conceived and partly reduced to practice by some of his predecessors, of committing one or another case or a group of cases to the examination, or to the decision, of several cardinals. By a judicious division of administrative matters, he established the permanent organization of these departments of the Curia. Immensa aeterni Dei called for the formation of 15 permanent congregations:

- Congregation for the Holy Inquisition
- Congregation of the Signatura
- Congregation for the Erection of Churches and Consistorial Provisions
- Congregation of the Annona, for the provisioning of Rome and the provinces
- Congregation for Sacred Rites and Ceremonies
- Congregation of the Sapienza
- Congregation for an Index of Forbidden Books
- Congregation for the Execution and Interpretation of the Council of Trent
- Congregation of the Public Welfare
- Congregation for the University of the Roman study (or school)
- Congregation for Regulations of Religious Orders
- Congregation for Regulations of Bishops and Other Prelates
- Congregation for Taking Care of Roads, Bridges, and Waters
- Congregation for the Vatican Printing-Press
- Congregation of State Consultations

While the chief end of the Congregations of Cardinals was to assist the pontiff in the administration of the affairs of the Church, some of these congregations were created to assist in the administration of the temporal States of the Holy See. Immensa Aeterni Dei has since been superseded, most recently by Pope John Paul II's constitution Pastor Bonus.

=== Reform of Pius X ===
Other congregations were added by different popes, until a complete organization was established by Pope Pius X in his Constitution Sapienti Consilio of 29 June 1908, according to which there were thirteen congregations, counting that of the Propaganda as only one; however, the last-named congregation is divided into two parts: Congregation of the Propaganda for Affairs of the Latin Church, and Congregation of the Propaganda for Affairs of the Oriental Rites, it may well be considered as two congregations, so that the total number of the congregations is fourteen. Sixtus V granted ordinary jurisdiction to each of the congregations which he instituted within the limits of the cases assigned to it, reserving to himself and to his successors the presidency of some of the more important congregations, such as the Congregation of the Holy Inquisition and that of the Signature of Grace. As time went on, the congregations of cardinals, which at first dealt exclusively with administrative matters, came to pass upon the legal points of the cases submitted to them, until the congregations overshadowed the ecclesiastical tribunals and even the Roman Rota, in fact almost taking their places. In time the transaction of business was impeded by the accumulation of jurisdictions, different congregations exercising jurisdiction rendering decisions and enacting laws in the same matters; Pius X resolved to define the competency of each congregation more precisely and to provide otherwise for the better exercise of its functions.

On 29 June 1908, with the constitution Sapienti Consilio, Pope Pius X reduced the number of the congregations to 11. They were:

- Holy Office
- Consistorial Congregation
- Sacraments
- Congregation for the Council
- Congregation for Religious
- Propaganda Fide
- Congregation for Rites
- Congregation for Ceremonial
- Congregation for Extraordinary Ecclesiastical Affairs
- Congregation for Seminaries and Universities
- Congregation for the Eastern Church

All decisions of the sacred congregations require pontifical approval, unless special powers have been given previously by the pope. The officials of the congregations are divided into two classes: minor officers, who are to be chosen by competitive examination and named by a letter of the cardinal-prefect, and major officers, freely selected by the pope, and named by a note of the cardinal secretary of state. There is to be henceforth no cumulation of offices in the hands of one individual, not only to satisfy the requirements of distributive justice, but also because the tenure of several offices by the same person often results in detriment to the service. Wherefore, it is forbidden for an officer of one of the congregations to serve in any way as an agent, or as a procurator or advocate, in his own department or in any other ecclesiastical tribunal.

The competency of the 'congresso' in each congregation is determined. The congresso consists of the major officers under the presidency of the cardinal who presides over the congregation. It deals with the matters of less importance among those that are before the congregation, while those of greater moment must be referred to the full congregation. It is also the business of the congresso to prepare for their discussion those matters that are to be considered by the full congregation. On the other hand, the congresso is charged with the execution of the orders of the full congregation that have received the approval of the pope. As examples of matters of greater importance which must be considered by the full congregation, the special rules (normæ peculiares) mention the solution of doubts or of questions that may arise in regard to the interpretation of ecclesiastical laws, the examination of important administrative controversies and kindred matters.

=== Reform of Paul VI ===
Following the Second Vatican Council, Pope Paul VI implemented many of the changes called for in the Curia with his constitution Regimini Ecclesiae Universae of 15 August 1967. The functions of some offices that had already been severely reduced were abolished: the Sacred Ceremonial Congregation. One of the main changes brought about by Paul VI was the admission of diocesan bishops and archbishops as members of the Congregations, which has previously been restricted to cardinals. As before, the members of a congregation do not intervene in the day-to-day operations of the congregation, which is in the hands of the prefect and the permanent staff, headed generally by the secretary and the undersecretary. The permanent staff is to be of international provenance. Membership normally meet to discuss more general problems and to determine guidelines no more than once a year.

=== Reform of John Paul II ===
The most recent reorganization of the Roman Congregations came with Pope John Paul II's constitution Pastor Bonus, issued June 28, 1988. This constitution more closely aligned the structure of the Curia with the norms established by the 1983 Code of Canon Law and the early drafts of what became the 1990 Code of Canons for the Eastern Churches. Pastor Bonus also continued Paul's expansion of the membership of congregations, allowing priests, deacons, the religious and the laity to be members of certain congregations and establishing consultors, experts appointed to the dicasteries of the Roman Curia to provide opinions, either singly or collectively, for particular issues when required.

Sr. Luzia Premoli, superior general of the Combonian Missionary Sisters, was appointed a member of the Congregation for the Evangelization of Peoples in 2014, thus becoming the first woman to be appointed a member of a Vatican congregation.

=== Reform of Pope Francis ===
On 19 March 2022, Pope Francis issue the apostolic constitution Praedicate evangelium, abrogating and replacing Pope John Paul II's Pastor bonus of 1988. The former Congregations are now termed "dicasteries" (i.e., "departments"). Before the reform, the most important department of the Vatican was the Congregation for the Doctrine of the Faith. With Praedicate evangelium, the most important department is the Dicastery for Evangelization, with the Dicastery for the Doctrine of the Faith coming second.

== See also ==
- Agents of Roman Congregations
