= Girolamo Rossi =

Girolamo Rossi may refer to:

- Girolamo Rossi (composer) (fl. Naples 1733–1768), Italian composer
- Girolamo Rossi (engraver) (1682–?), Italian engraver
- Girolamo Rossi (physician) (1539–1607), Italian physician and writer
