= Cardinal Grimaldi =

Cardinal Grimaldi may refer to:

- Girolamo Grimaldi (died 1543)
- Girolamo Grimaldi-Cavalleroni (died 1685)
- Nicola Grimaldi I (died 1717)
- Girolamo Grimaldi (1674–1733)
