= Aeterni =

Aeterni may refer to:

- Aeterni regis, a papal bull issued on 21 June 1481 by Pope Sixtus IV
- Aeterni Patris, an 1879 encyclical of Pope Leo XIII
- Immensa aeterni Dei, an apostolic constitution in the form of a papal bull issued by Pope Sixtus V on February, 1588
