= Girolamo Rossi (engraver) =

Italian engraver

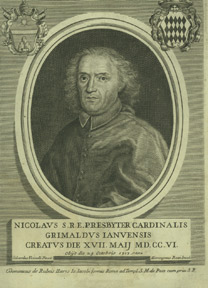
Portrait of Cardinal Nicola Grimaldi by Girolamo Rossi

Girolamo Rossi (born 1682) was an Italian engraver of the late Baroque. He was also called Girolamo de Rubeis the Younger. He was born and lived most of his life in Rome, where he engraved a variety of plates after the Italian painters. He is said to have been a pupil of Camillo Rama, and painted in the style of Paolo Veronese. He also executed several portraits of the cardinals of his time, for a series which was afterwards continued by Pazzi and others.

He engraved The Virgin and Infant Jesus after Correggio and The Martyrdom of St. Agapita after Giovanni Odazzi. He also engraved a portrait of Pope Pius V, and one of Saint Carlo Borromeo kneeling.
