= The Martyrdom of Saint Andrew (Ribera) =

Painting by Jusepe de Ribera

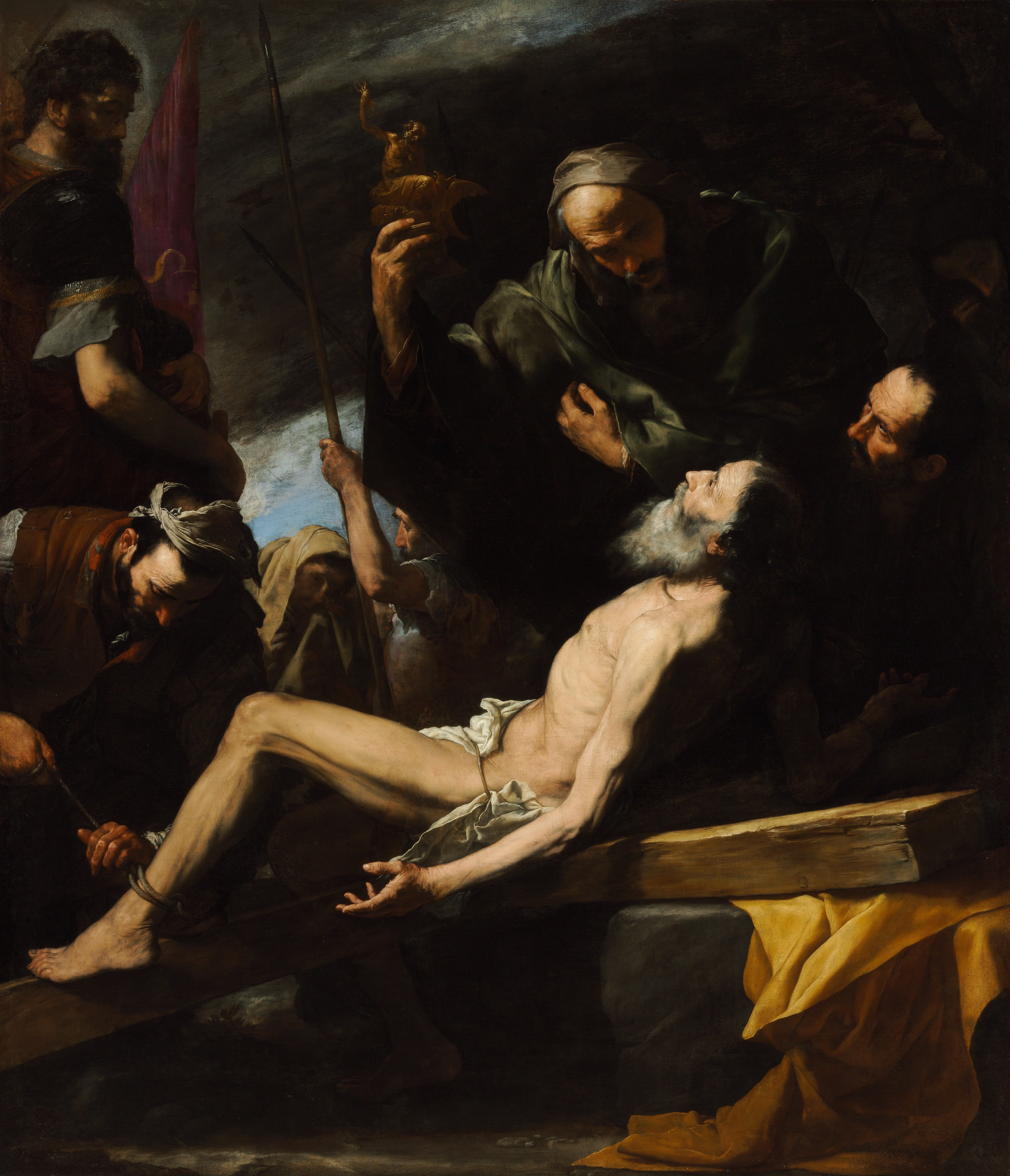
- Artist: Jusepe de Ribera
- Year: 1628
- Dimensions: 285 cm × 209 cm (112 in × 82 in)
- Location: Museum of Fine Arts, Budapest

The Martyrdom of Saint Andrew is a 1628 painting by Jusepe de Ribera. It depicts the martyrdom of Saint Andrew, one of the Twelve Apostles.

== Style ==
The painting reveals the influence on Ribera of the realism of Caravaggio, particularly that artist's Crucifixion of Saint Peter.

== History ==
The work was owned by Juan Alfonso Enríquez de Cabrera, Admiral of Castille, until it was inherited by his son Juan Gaspar Enríquez de Cabrera in 1647. It was later donated to the monastery of San Pascual in Madrid.

After the French occupied Spain, the work came into the hands of Andrés del Peral around 1816. About two years later, he sold it to Aloys von Kaunitz-Rietberg, the Austrian Empire's ambassador to Spain.

Nikolaus II, Prince Esterházy bought the work in 1820 and the painting remained in the Esterházy family after his death in 1833.

The work entered the Hungarian national collection in 1871, and is now on display in the Museum of Fine Arts in Budapest since 1871.

== Bibliography ==
- Alfonso Pérez Sánchez, Nicola Spinosa, Jusepe de Ribera, 1591-1652, Metropolitan Museum of Art, 1992 pp. 86–87
