= Fundación Carlos de Amberes =

Carlos de Amberes Foundation
- Fundación Carlos de Amberes (Spanish)
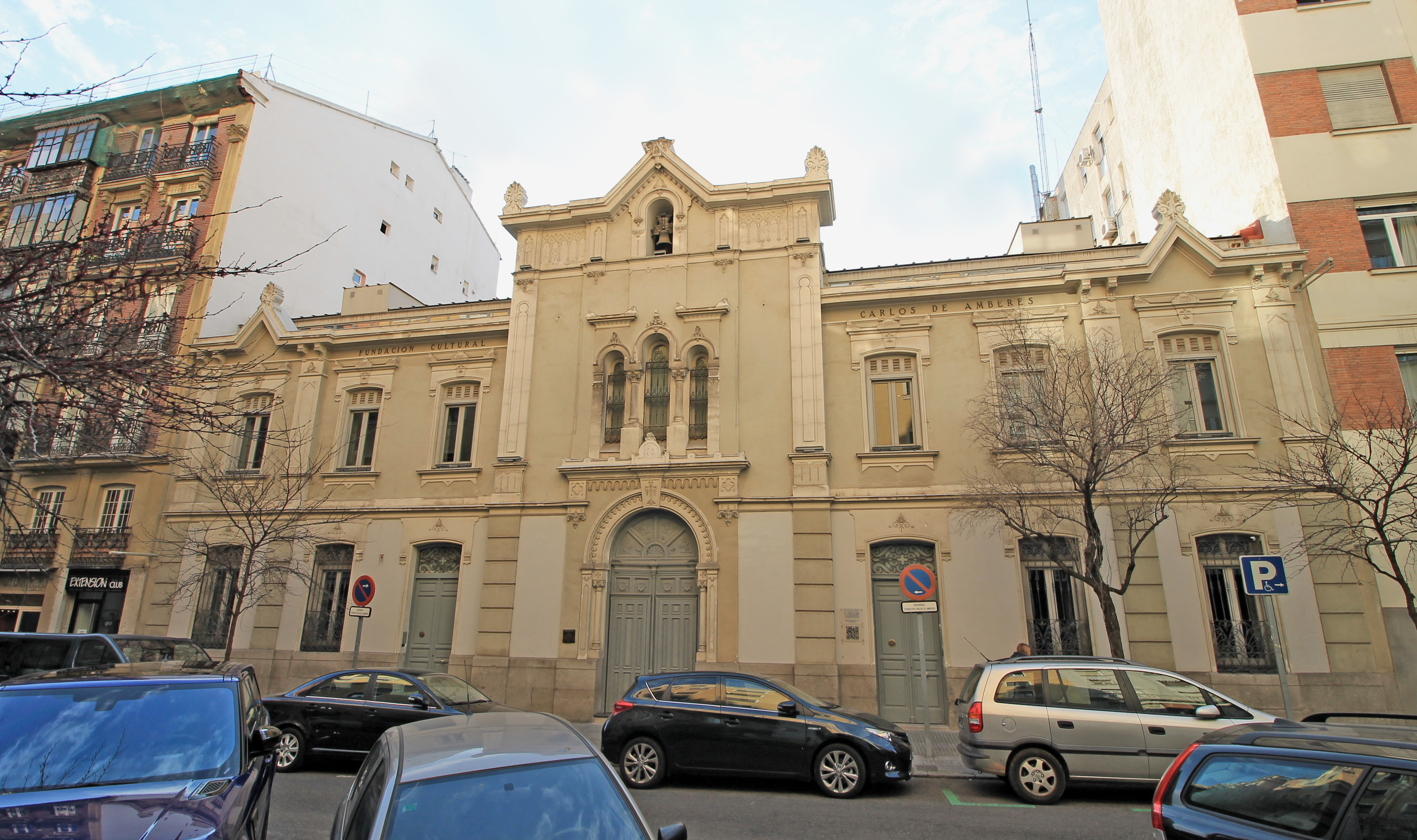

- Location within Spain
- 40.431284°N 3.685849°W
- Location: Madrid, Spain

History
- Built: 1877

Site notes
- Architect(s): Agustín Ortiz de Villajos; Manuel Ortiz de Villajos
- Architectural style: Eclecticism

Spanish Cultural Heritage
- Official name: Fundación Carlos de Amberes
- Type: Non-movable
- Criteria: Monument
- Designated: 1994
- Reference no.: RI-51-0007300

The Carlos de Amberes Foundation (Spanish: Fundación Carlos de Amberes) is a private non-profit institution created in 1594 to house the poor and the pilgrims who, arriving from the former Seventeen Provinces of the Netherlands (today Belgium, Luxembourg, the Netherlands, and Northern France) were travelling to the Court in Madrid. Nowadays, it promotes programs, activities, and publications in the humanistic and scientific areas, as well as exhibitions, concerts, conferences, and seminars. Its main lines of action are focused on the Modern History of Europe, especially that of Spain and the Benelux, and the reflection on the construction of Europe.

== History ==
Originally, it was created under the name of the Real Diputación de San Andrés de los Flamencos, to house and accommodate the poor and pilgrims from the Seventeen Provinces of the Netherlands.

The history of the Real Diputación de San Andrés de los Flamencos dates back to the year 1594, when on August 16, Charles of Antwerp (Spanish: Carlos de Amberes) ceded a series of properties in a public deed so that upon his death they would serve as a shelter and lodging for the poor from the Seventeen Provinces of the Netherlands visiting the Court of Madrid. The creation of the San Andrés de los Flamencos hospital coincided with the birth of other private charitable institutions, which have gradually disappeared or continue to this day, although modified, such as San Luis de los Franceses, San Antonio de los Alemanes, or San Fermín de los Navarros. At the death of the founder, in 1604, the soldier of the ancient noble guard of the House of Burgundy Miguel du Frêne, executor of Charles of Antwerp's will, with the support of the Flemish guard, materialized the founder's idea and created the new hospital for the poor, under the invocation of Saint Andrew, patron of the Duchy of Burgundy.

Since 1606, King Philip III of Spain accepted the Board of Trustees of the Foundation for himself and for his successors, establishing in his first Constitutions (1616) that it should be directed by natural persons from any of the Seventeen Provinces of the Netherlands, or by descendants of these.

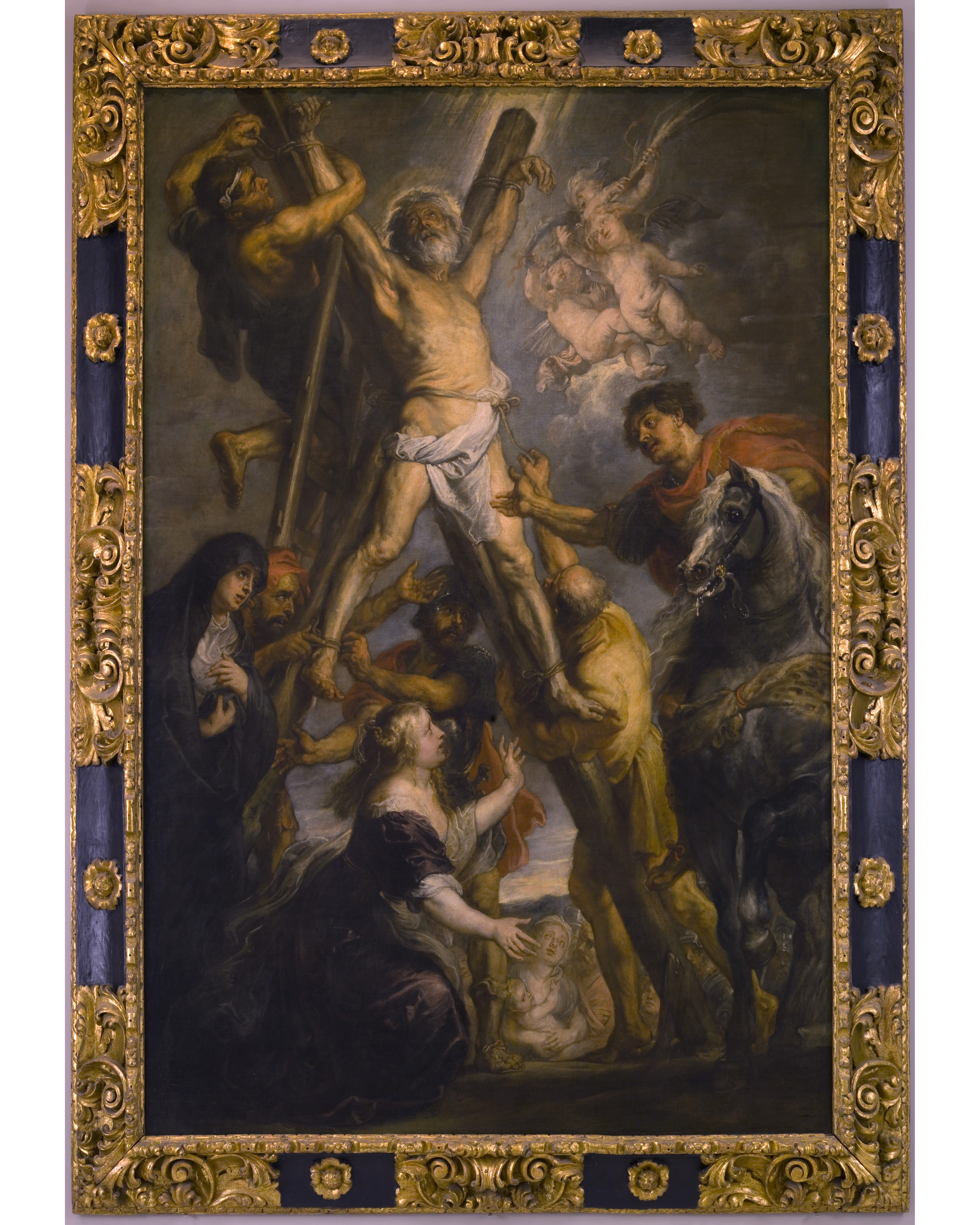
The Martyrdom of Saint Andrew (Rubens) (c. 1638-1639). Oil on canvas, 306 x 216 cm.

In 1621, the architect Juan Gómez de Mora was commissioned to create a new building on San Marcos Street in Madrid, which would house the hospital and a church. Jan Van Vucht, representative in Madrid of Balthasar Moretus, commissioned the Flemish painter Peter Paul Rubens in 1636 the painting of the Martyrdom of Saint Andrew, which after his death was placed on the main altar of the Hospital of San Andrés's Church. This painting has remained in the possession of the Real Diputación de San Andrés's hospital, according to the express wish of Van Vucht. After more than 380 years it still retains its original frame.

With the confiscation of the assets of hospitals and houses of mercy, decreed by Godoy in 1798, the Royal Delegation of San Andrés de los Flamencos had to go through very serious crises, and was on the verge of disappearing. The economic situation worsened even more during the reign of Ferdinand VII, due to the impossibility of maintaining the building, which resulted in the collapse of the old church in 1848. Thanks to the Belgian diplomats in Madrid, who obtained support from the Spanish Crown, the Foundation was able to rise again. On November 30, 1877, the feast of San Andrés, those active representatives of the Kingdom of Belgium inaugurated, with the assistance of King Alfonso XII and the Princess of Asturias, Isabel of Bourbon, a new hospital and a new church on Claudio Coello Street, in the modern expansion of Madrid promoted in those years by the financier Marquis of Salamanca. Its church became the first parish in the district of Salamanca. Since then, the headquarters of the Carlos de Amberes Foundation have remained there. The author of the church was the architect Agustín Ortiz de Villajos. For its design, it was based on that of the pantheon of the counts of Santamarca located in the Saint Isidore Cemetery, using practically identical shapes and motifs.

The Royal Hospital of San Andrés de los Flamencos is one of the few institutions that, due to successive circumstances in history, has remained alive for more than 400 years. It has currently become one of the oldest non-profit private foundations in Europe, and has managed to evolve thanks to the work of its deputies and collaborators.

The Foundation radically changed its character and functions after requesting King Juan Carlos I of Spain to transform it into a cultural entity, abandoning the charitable and welfare purpose that had originated it. After receiving the royal approval, it was registered in the Protectorate of the Ministry of Culture as a non-profit Private Cultural Foundation on January 22, 1988.

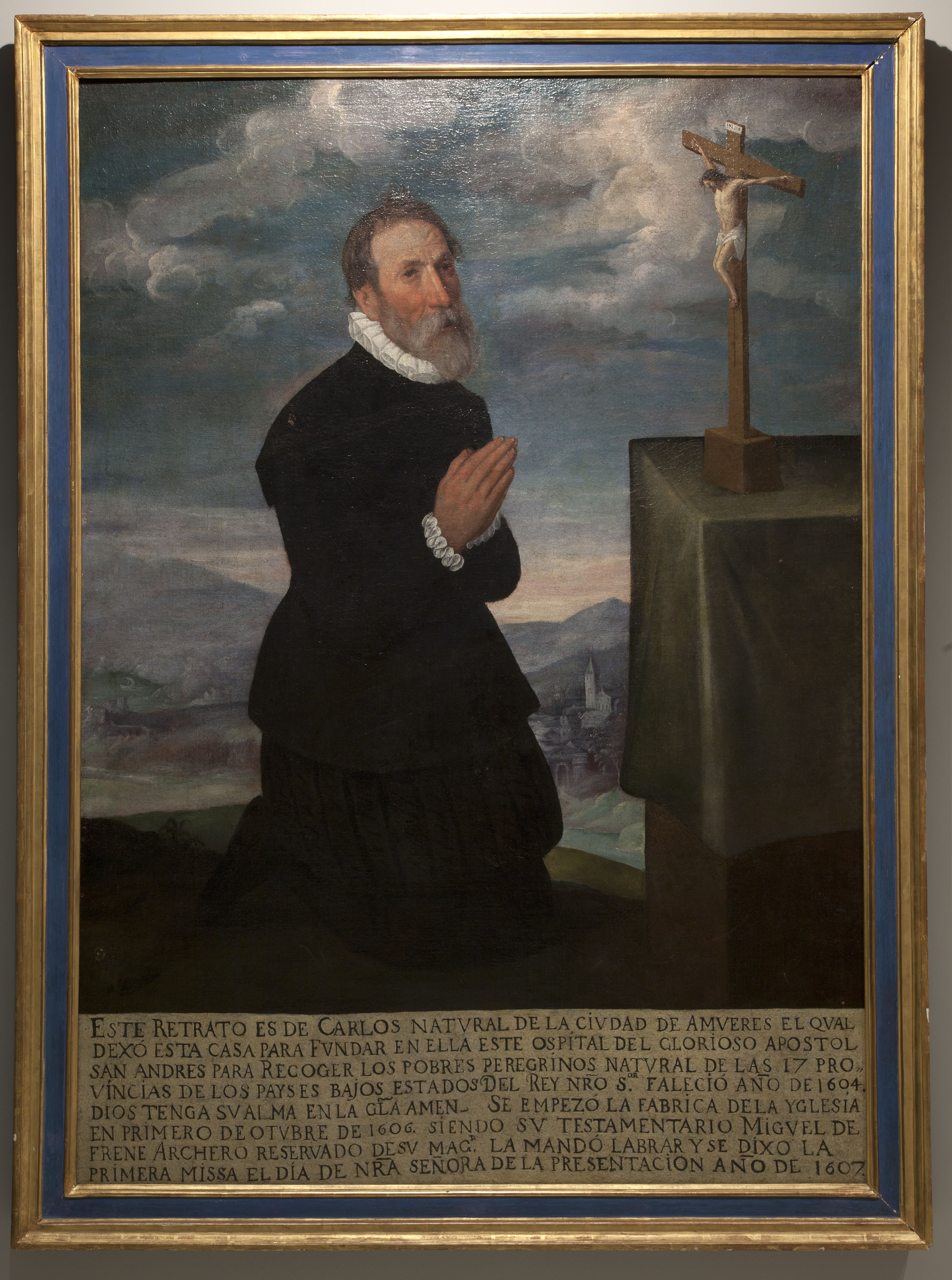
Anonymous Portrait of Charles of Antwerp (1598)

Soon a series of reforms began to be carried out in the old structure of the building, the original work of the brothers Agustín and Manuel Ortíz de Villajos (1876-1877). The eclectic-style building, which had been conceived in the 19th century as a church, hostelry, and infirmary, underwent extensive remodeling to adapt its spaces to the new aims of the Foundation. The architects Solans - Briales del Amo created a modern cultural center, integrating into the old building new spaces for an auditorium, exhibition halls, library, technical services, and offices.

On November 25, 1992, the Kings of Spain, Don Juan Carlos, and Doña Sofía, accompanied by the Kings of Belgium, Baudouin I and Queen Fabiola, inaugurated the renovated and expanded headquarters of the Carlos de Amberes Foundation, converted into one of reference centers in the capital of Spain. As of that year, the Foundation began new activities aimed at promoting cultural, historical, and scientific exchanges between Spain and the former Provinces of the Netherlands, which today are divided between the current Netherlands, Luxembourg, Belgium, and France. The building that houses the Carlos de Amberes Foundation was declared of cultural interest in 1994.

It has a library of more than 4,000 volumes, specialized in European subjects, Francophone literature and Dutch literature, and subjects of History and Fine Arts of the former Seventeen Provinces. Most of its bibliographic holdings come from the Belgian Embassy, from donations from the French-speaking and Flemish Communities of Belgium, from private entities and from people interested in the work of the Foundation.

The Foundation also exhibits the portrait of the Second Marquis of Casa Riera, by Raimundo de Madrazo, a painting deposited by Queen Fabiola of Belgium at the Foundation since 1997. It also has a magnificent symphonic harmonium from 1857, unique in Spain, the work of Jean-Baptiste-Napoleon Fourneaux, supplier to Emperor Napoleon III. Since its restoration in 1994, numerous concerts have been offered on this harmonium by specialists such as Christian Mouyen, and recordings of contemporary music have been made on the instrument.

== The Foundation's activities ==
The Carlos de Amberes Foundation has been carrying out a highly varied range of activities since 1992, ranging from art exhibitions (photography, plastic arts, modern art, history) to conferences, seminars, poetry recitals, and classical and jazz music concerts. The space can also be rented for private company events.

== Exhibitions ==
The Foundation has carried out more than 60 exhibitions, some of special relevance, such as those dedicated to the photographs of Edward Steichen, René Magritte and Man Ray, to scientific instruments, astrolabes and clocks from the 16th century from the Leuven mathematical studies, to the works on paper by Rembrandt and Van Dyck, to Christophe Plantin and the Flemish printers of the 16th and 17th centuries, to the cartographers from Flanders and the Netherlands such as Blaeu and Mercator, the illustrator Hergé and his most famous and universal creation, Tintin, and to draftsmen, engravers and painters of modern and avant-garde art such as Félicien Rops, M. C. Escher, Paul Delvaux, Ramón Casas or Toulouse-Lautrec.

Other notable historical exhibitions are those dedicated to "The end of the Flanders War (1621-1648)", "That war of ours with the United States", "Iustitĭa", "The Fruit of Faith" and "The Royal Alcázar of Madrid".

Outside the Spanish capital, the Foundation has organized exhibitions such as "Philip I the Handsome, beauty and madness", first in Burgos, the city where the monarch died in 1506, and later in Bruges, his birthplace and resting place of his ancestors.

From November 5, 2014, to August 2, 2015, the Carlos de Amberes Museum opened to the public. Flemish and Dutch masters, with works mostly on loan from the Royal Museum of Fine Arts in Antwerp (KMSKA), to which were added those from other institutions such as the Prado Museum and National Heritage, and private collectors, including the Foundation Alba's house (Spanish: Fundación Casa de Alba). The museum was made up of pieces by Rubens, Pieter Brueghel the Elder, Anton van Dyck, David Teniers II, Jordaens, Francken, de Vos, etc. The exhibition criteria, determined by the scientific adviser of the museum and member of the board of trustees of the Fernando Checa Cremades Foundation, is to show a journey through the various genres of Flemish painting: portraits, landscapes, mythology, religion, daily life, still lifes, etc. ...The museum was complemented by two temporary exhibitions, one of Rembrandt engravings donated by the National Library and the Fondation Custodia and another of Flemish and Dutch landscapes from the 17th century from the Deltoro-Vives collection.

Once the museum closed, the Foundation returned to hosting exhibitions of various kinds such as the Pepe Estévez Prize for contemporary art or a collection of 17th century paintings.

== Concerts and music cycles ==
Since 1992, more than 80 concerts have been held in its auditorium, both for chamber music and for soloists and vocal groups of international prestige. The average number of concerts per year is 15, with the participation of institutions such as the Royal Conservatory of Brussels, the Reina Sofía School of Music, or ensembles and artists such as the Huelgas Ensemble, Brussels Virtuosi, The Scholars, The Chapel of Burgundy, Oxalys of Brussels and jazz groups from Spain, Belgium, and the Netherlands. The Foundation has published music recordings with the repertoire of Philip I the Handsome, Maximilian I, Mary of Burgundy, and Margaret of Austria; balls and dances of the Duchy of Burgundy and its heritage in Europe; and released for the first time, through concerts and recordings, the figure and work of the Spanish composer Juan Oliver y Astorga, a traveling musician through the Courts of Naples, Germany, Brussels, England and Spain.

== Conferences ==
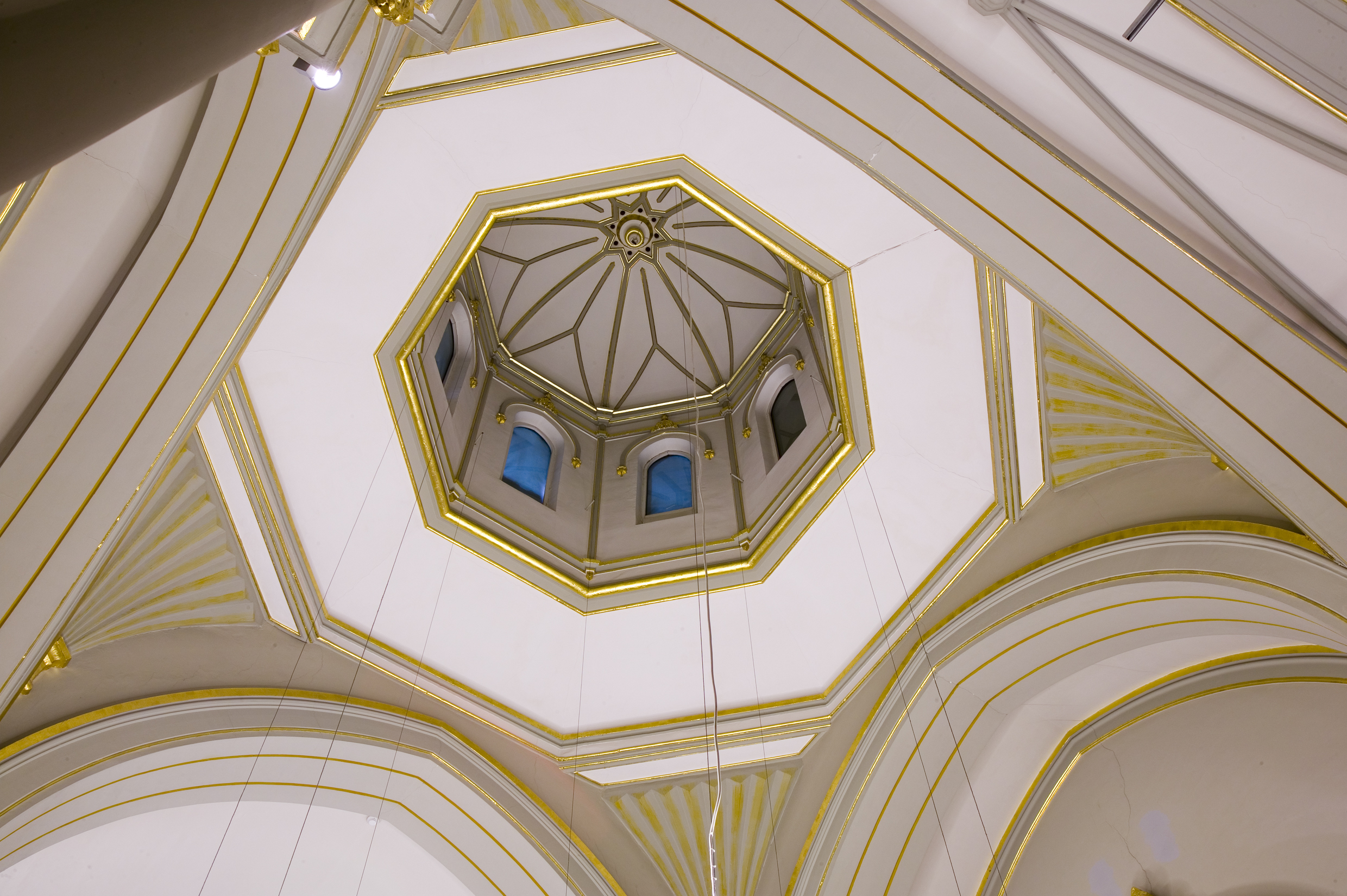
The Carlos de Amberes Foundations's Dome viewed from the inside.

The conferences organized by the Carlos de Amberes Foundation deal with historical-cultural, Europeanist issues or those related to commemorations of famous historical figures and major events.

Since 1999, every year the Foundation organizes an International History Seminar with an interdisciplinary approach, addressing topics such as: "The Empire of Charles V", "The Royal Chapel of the Habsburgs", "Sephardism in the Hispanic Monarchy", " The Spanish Monarchy as Monarchy of Nations", "Art in the Court of the Catholic Kings", "Banking, Credit and Capital in the Hispanic Monarchy", "The War of the Spanish Succession" and "The legacy of Burgundy in the ceremonial and the party of Court".

Other series of conferences have been dedicated to the figures of the Duke of Alba, William of Orange, Joanna the Mad, the siege of Breda in 1625, the painters Van Dyck, Frans Hals and Vermeer, or Paul Delvaux.

Regarding the conferences with Europeanist content, it is worth noting the presence at the Foundation of a large number of relevant figures from Spanish and European politics: Leo Tindemans, Philippe Maystadt, Guy Spitaels, Willy Claes, Alexandre Lamfalussy, Jacques Santer, Jean-Luc Dehaene, Wim Kok, Jean-Claude Juncker, Felipe González, José María Aznar, Javier Solana and Joaquín Almunia. These conferences have been complemented by the organization of lectures on the various preparatory Intergovernmental Conferences for the Treaty of Amsterdam. The foundation has also dealt, in a successive series of three summer courses at the Complutense University of Madrid, with issues related to cooperation and development policies in Africa, or the South-South dialogue.

== Other activities ==
Apart from the aforementioned activities, the Foundation also carries out research programs, postgraduate courses with the National University of Distance Education (Spanish: Universidad Nacional de Educación a Distancia, UNED) and the Autonomous University of Madrid, seminars, and presentations by distinguished writers.

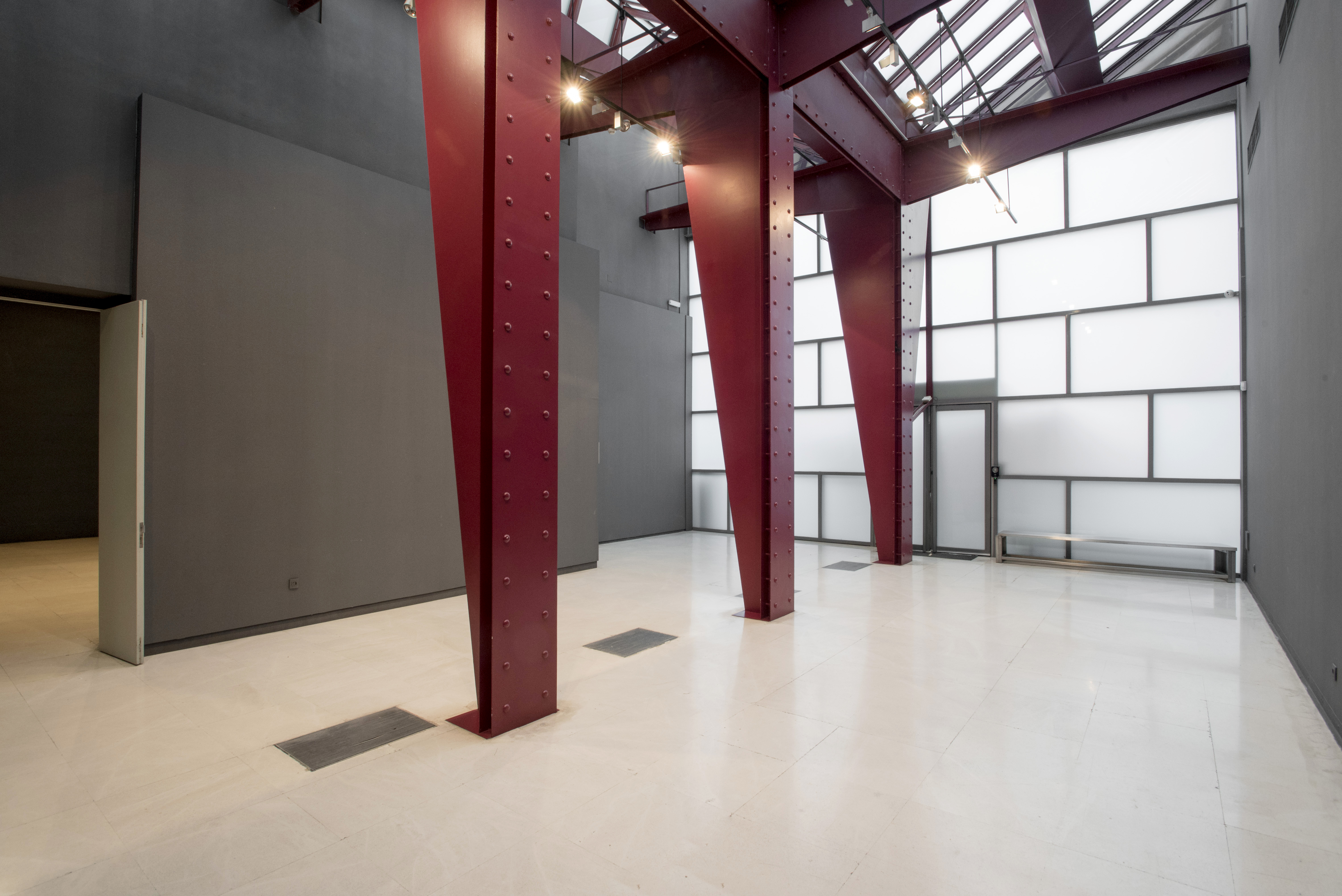
The Carlos de Amberes Foundations' "Gante" Room

The Carlos de Amberes Foundation has signed collaboration agreements in recent years with institutions and companies, to contribute to a better development of its foundational purposes. Among them, the Assembly of Madrid, Charles III University of Madrid, Autonomous University of Madrid, Complutense University of Madrid, University of Alcalá, Polytechnic University of Madrid, The National Library of Spain, Cervantes Institute, Fundación Universidad-Empresa, Fundación General de la Universidad Carlos III, Sociedad Estatal para la Conmemoración de los Centenarios de Felipe II y Carlos V, Fundación Ortega y Gasset, Fundación Ramón Areces, Fundación Tabacalera, Fundación Caja Madrid, Fundación Isaac Albéniz, Confederación Española de Fundaciones, Centro de Fundaciones, Ibercaja, Sabena, Petrofina, Fortis España, Ministry of Culture, Community of Madrid and the City Council of Madrid.

Its auditorium and exhibition halls can be rented to institutions, companies and individuals who want to celebrate a promotional or social event in them. In particular, the auditorium has excellent acoustic quality, which makes it the ideal room for all kinds of chamber music recordings.

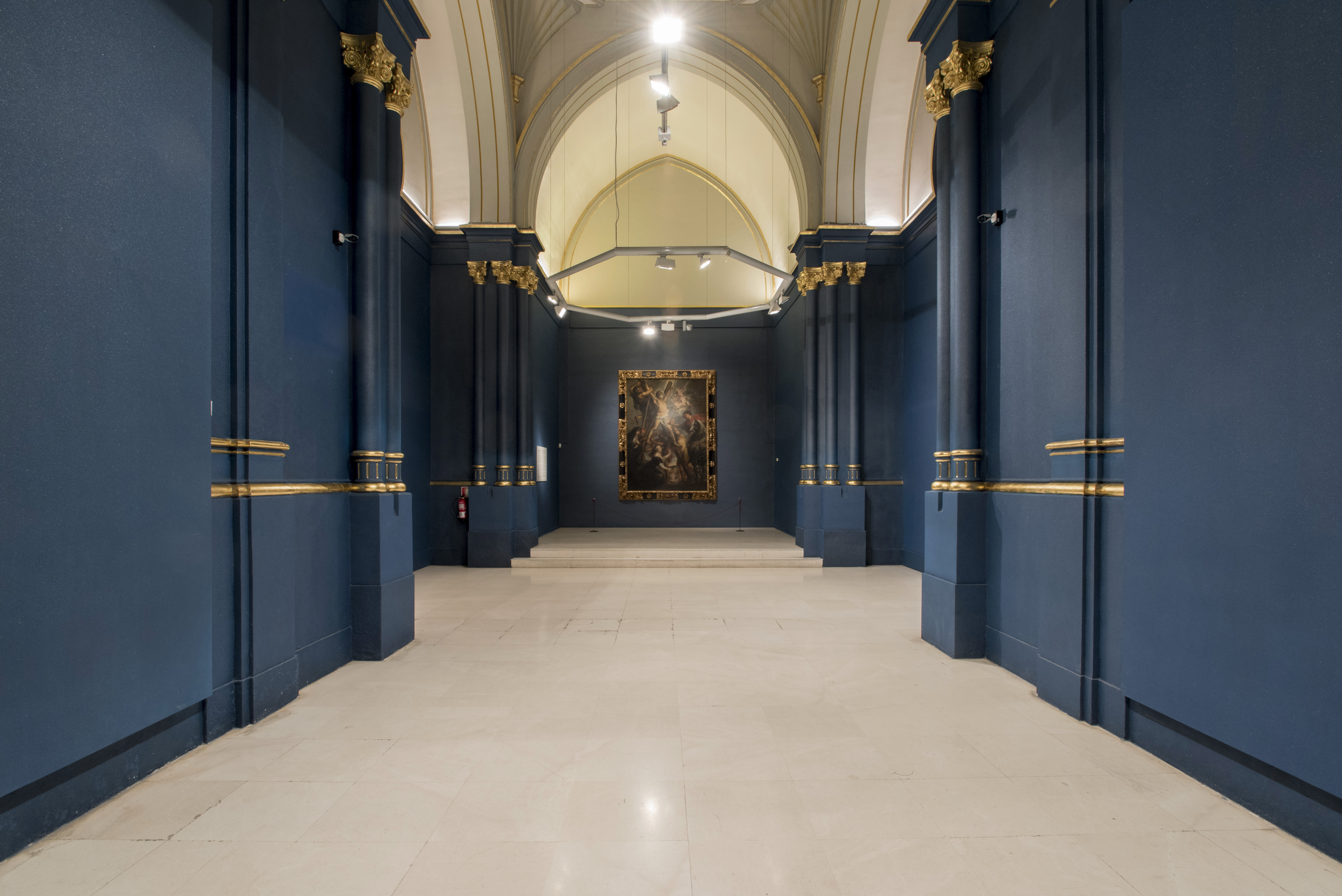
The Chapel of the Carlos de Amberes Foundation, Madrid
