= Crucifixion of Saint Peter =

The Crucifixion of Saint Peter refers to the death of Saint Peter.

It may also refer to:

- Crucifixion of Saint Peter (Caravaggio), a painting of 1600
- The Crucifixion of Saint Peter (Michelangelo), a fresco painting of c. 1546–1550

== See also ==
- Cross of St. Peter
