= The Martyrdom of Saint Andrew (Murillo) =

Painting by Bartolomé Murillo

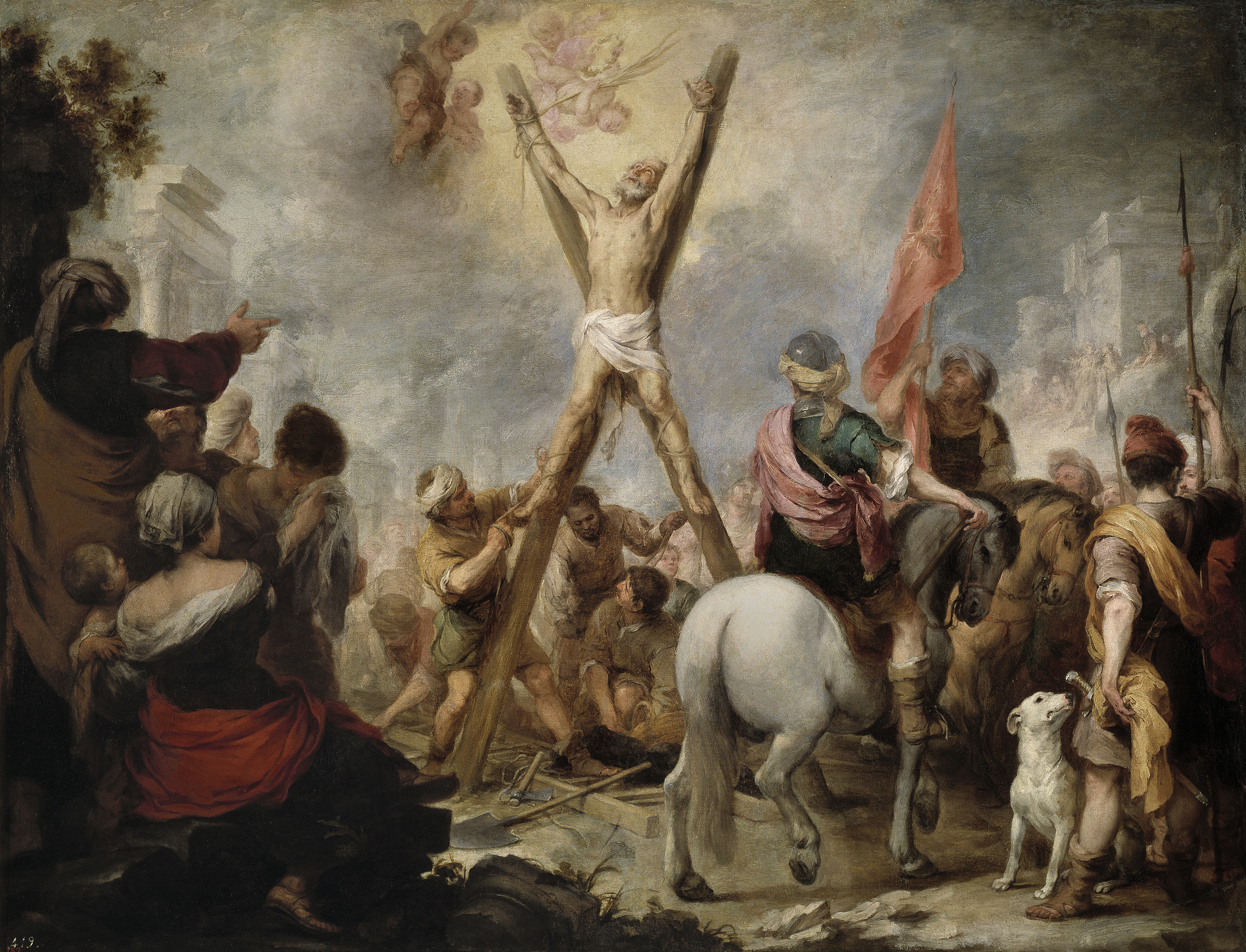

The Martyrdom of Saint Andrew is a 1675-1682 oil on canvas painting by Murillo, now in the Museo del Prado.

Its tone is heavily influenced by the work of Peter Paul Rubens, particularly his own depiction of the same subject, and de Ribera's The Martyrdom of Saint Philip.
