= Girolamo Rossi (composer) =

Italian composer

Girolamo Rossi (fl. Naples 1733–1768) was an Italian composer.

== Selected recordings ==
- G. Rossi: Cantata in onore di S. Antonio da Padova & Lectio quarta. Lucia Casagrande Raffi, Elisabetta Pallucchi Rombarocca Ensemble, Lorenzo Tozzi Bongiovanni 2020
