= Girolamo Rossi (physician) =

Italian physician and writer

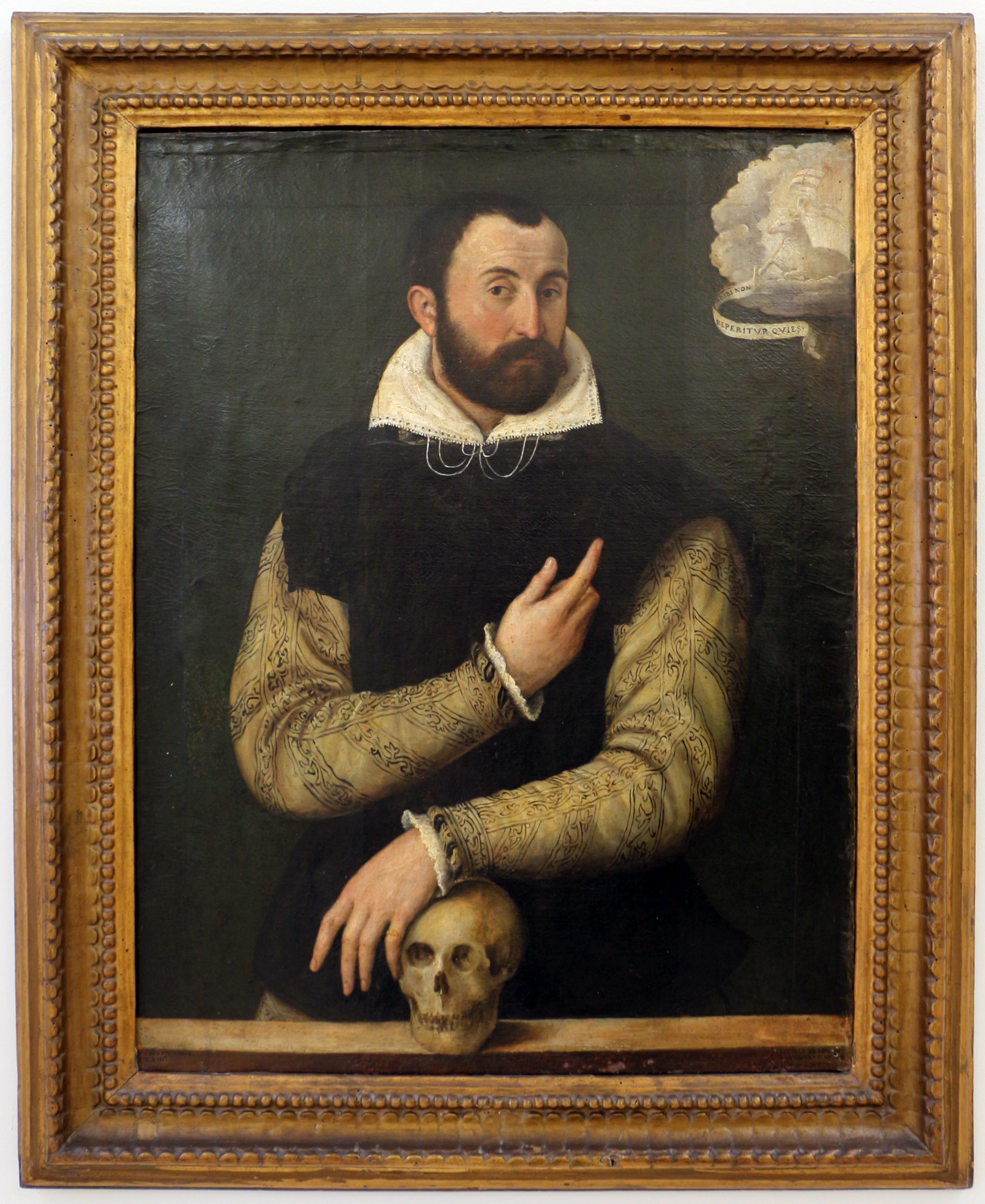

Girolamo Rossi (15 July 1539 – 22 April 1607) was an Italian physician and writer.

He was born to a prominent noble family of Ravenna, but was sent to study medicine in Rome under the patronage of an uncle, who was governor general of the order of the Carmelites. At the age of 28 he married Laura Bifolci. In addition to his skills in the medical art, including the patronage of Clement VIII, he was a prominent historian. His writings include:

- Historiarum Ravennatum ab ejus fundatione (1572), a ten volume history of Ravenna
- De distillatione (1582)
- De melonibus (1607)
- Vita Nicolai Papae IV (published posthumously in 1761)

He participated in the creation of a list of books approved by the Vatican.
