= San Salvador (Guipúzcoan squadron) =

History

Spain
- Name: San Salvador
- Honours and awards: Vice-flagship: Guipúzcoan squadron
- Captured: 1 August 1588 (English)
- Fate: Wrecked

General characteristics
- Tons burthen: 958 (Spanish rating) 600 (English assessment)
- Armament: 25 guns

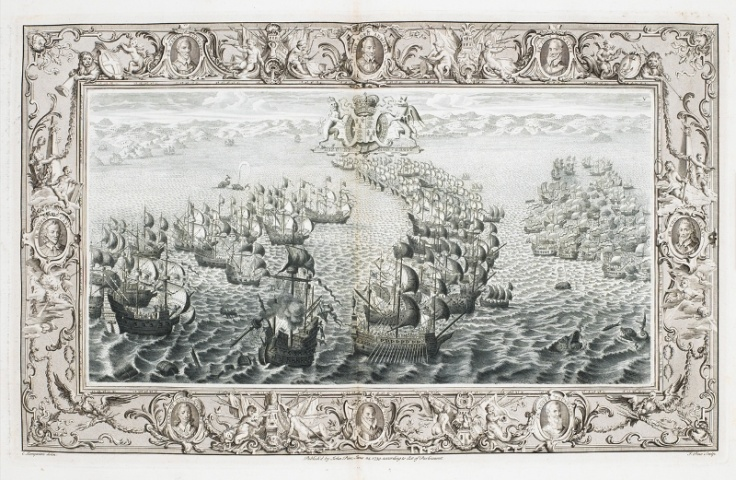
The burning and capture of Miguel de Oquendo's ship, the San Salvador

San Salvador was a Spanish galleon of the Spanish Armada as part of the Guipúzcoan squadron of Miguel de Oquendo. She was damaged and captured as a result of the first encounter of the Armada with the Royal Navy in 1588. San Salvador was lost at sea in the English Channel later that same year.

== Capture ==
During the first encounter with the English fleet on 31 July 1588, during a lull in battle, San Salvador's gunpowder magazine exploded, lighting a portion of the ship on fire. The Spanish fleet was able to extinguish the flames and rescue some of the injured. 49 crew died as a result of this explosion and 23 had died previously due to combat. On 1 August, San Salvador was ordered to be scuttled, but instead was simply set adrift. The English dispatched an inspection party to San Salvador and found approximately fifty burnt bodies aboard. Golden Hind, a ship in the English fleet, then towed San Salvador to the English port at Weymouth.

== Significance ==
San Salvador was one of the heaviest armed in the Spanish fleet. The Spanish records rate the ship at 958 tons, while the English assessment rated the ship at only 600 tons. These are the only numbers available for calibration of the reported vessel tonnage between the two fleets (the Spanish tended to give higher ratings). Between San Salvador and Rosario (another ship captured during the first encounter), the English retrieved a significant amount of cannon shot and powder. One estimate places the 229 barrels of powder captured from these two ships at one quarter the total used by the English during the entire campaign.

== After the campaign ==
San Salvador became known as the Great Spaniard to the English fleet after her capture. On 15 November 1588, notice was sent to Lord Charles Howard that San Salvador had been lost at sea at Studland. Twenty-three men died with the ship; thirty-four were saved by a small man-of-war. A wreck discovered in 1983 in Studland Bay was initially believed to be the San Salvador but is now thought to be a Spanish merchant ship, Santa Maria de Luce.

== See also ==
- Spanish Armada
- Galleon
