= Crucifixion of Saint Peter (Caravaggio) =

Painting by Caravaggio

- Crocifissione di San Pietro (Italian)
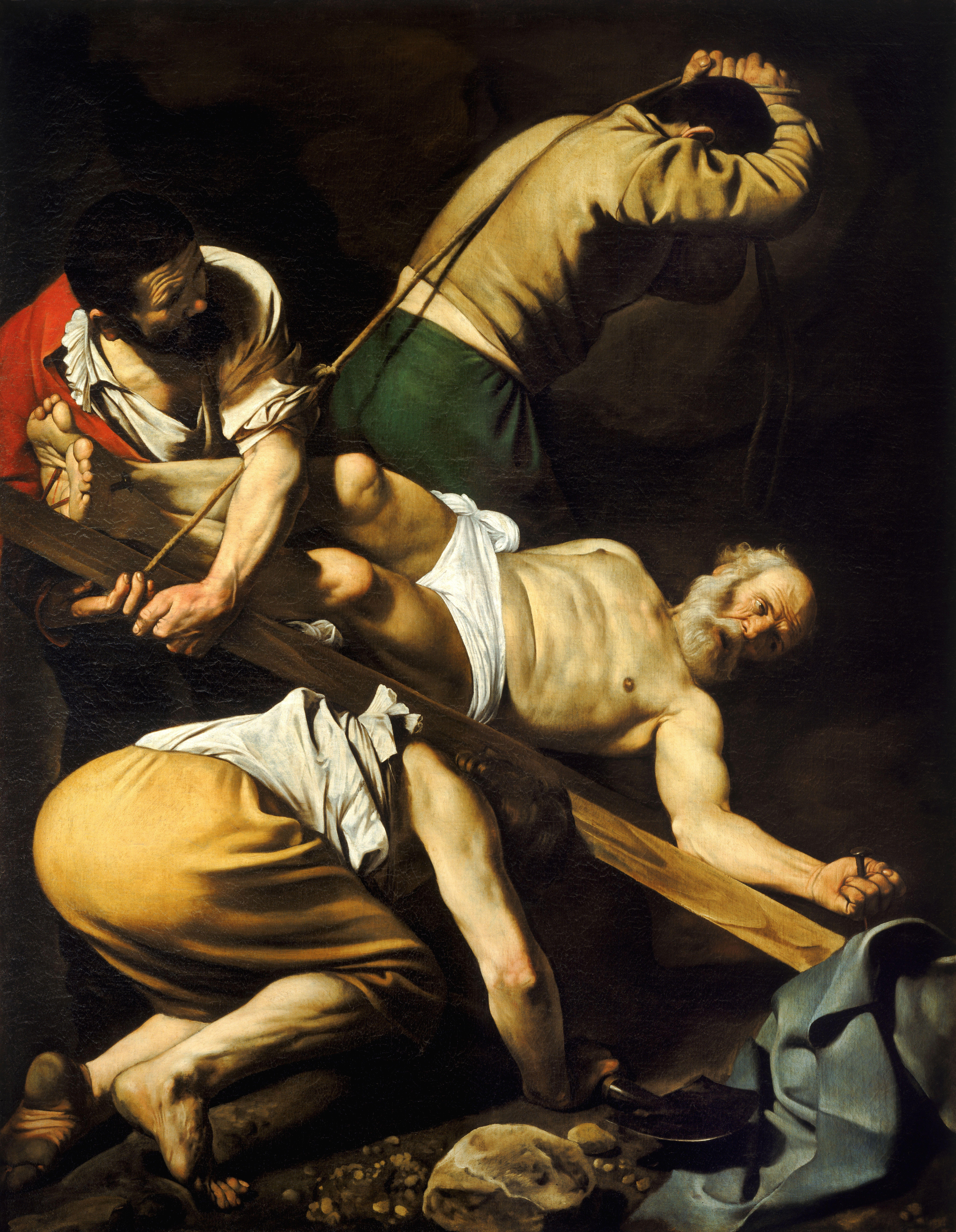
- Artist: Caravaggio
- Year: 1601
- Medium: Oil on canvas
- Dimensions: 230 cm × 175 cm (91 in × 69 in)
- Location: Santa Maria del Popolo; Rome

The Crucifixion of Saint Peter (Italian: Crocifissione di san Pietro) is a painting by the Italian Baroque master Michelangelo Merisi da Caravaggio, painted in 1601 for the Cerasi Chapel of Santa Maria del Popolo in Rome. Across the chapel is a second Caravaggio work depicting the Conversion of Saint Paul on the Road to Damascus (1601). On the altar between the two is the Assumption of the Virgin Mary by Annibale Carracci.

== History ==
The two lateral paintings were commissioned in September 1600 by Monsignor Tiberio Cerasi, Treasurer-General to Pope Clement VIII, who purchased the chapel from the Augustinian friars on 8 July 1600 and commissioned Carlo Maderno to rebuild the small edifice in Baroque style. The contract for the altarpiece with Carracci has not been preserved but it is generally assumed that the document had been signed somewhat earlier, and Caravaggio had to take into consideration the other artist's work and the overall iconographic programme of the chapel. Cerasi nourished a deep devotion towards Saint Peter and Paul, and invoked them in his will. Together the two saints represented the foundation of the Catholic Church, and they were called the Princes of the Apostles. Both had a strong connection to the city of Rome and the papacy. Caravaggio's paintings were thus intended to express Cerasi's attachment to the Church of Rome and his closeness to papal power. Their position in the chapel was important but the devotional focus was still on the Assumption of the Virgin Mary on the altar in the middle. The juxtaposition of the two scenes had a well-known precedent in the frescos of the Capella Paolina at the Apostolic Palace (1542–1549) but the paintings of Caravaggio were starkly different from the crowded Mannerist scenes of Michelangelo.

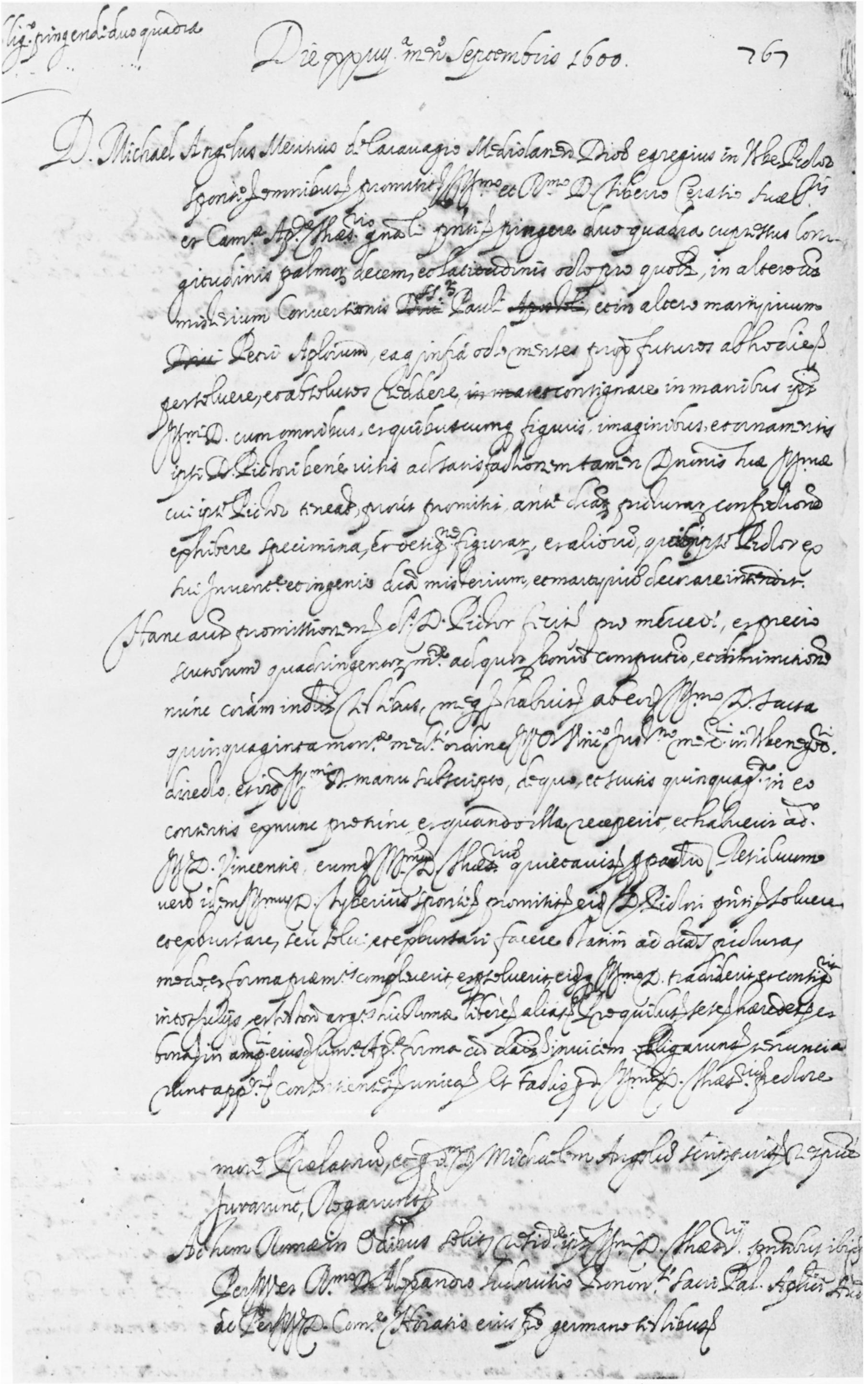
A notary's copy of the contract between Caravaggio and Cerasi.

Although much has been said about the supposed rivalry between Carracci and Caravaggio, there is no historical evidence about any serious tensions. Both were successful and sought-after artists in Rome. Caravaggio gained the Cerasi commission right after his celebrated works in the Contarelli Chapel had been finished, and Carracci was busy creating his great fresco cycle in the Palazzo Farnese. In these circumstances there was little reason for them to regard each other as business rivals, states Denis Mahon.

The contract signed on 24 September 1600 stipulates that "the distinguished painter, Michelangelo Merisi da Caravaggio" will paint two large cypress panels, ten palms high and eight palms wide, representing the conversion of Saint Paul and the martyrdom of Saint Peter within eight months for the price of 400 scudi. The contract gave a free hand to the painter to choose the figures, persons and ornaments depicted in the way as he saw fit, "to the satisfaction however of his Lordship", and he was also obliged to submit preparatory studies before the execution of the paintings. Caravaggio received 50 scudi as advance payment from the banker Vincenzo Giustiniani with the rest earmarked to be paid on completion. The dimensions specified for the panels are virtually the same as the size of the existing canvasses.

When Tiberio Cerasi died on 3 May 1601, Caravaggio was still working on the paintings, as attested by an avviso dated 5 May which mentioned that the chapel was being decorated by the hand of the "famosissimo Pittore", Michelangelo da Caravaggio. A second avviso dated 2 June proves that Caravaggio was still at work on the paintings a month later. He completed them sometime before 10 November when he received the final instalment from the heirs of Tiberio Cerasi, the Fathers of the Ospedale della Consolazione. The total compensation for the paintings was reduced to 300 scudi for unknown reasons.

The paintings were finally installed in the chapel on 1 May 1605 by the woodworker Bartolomeo who received four scudi and fifty baiocchi from the Ospedale for his work.

The first version

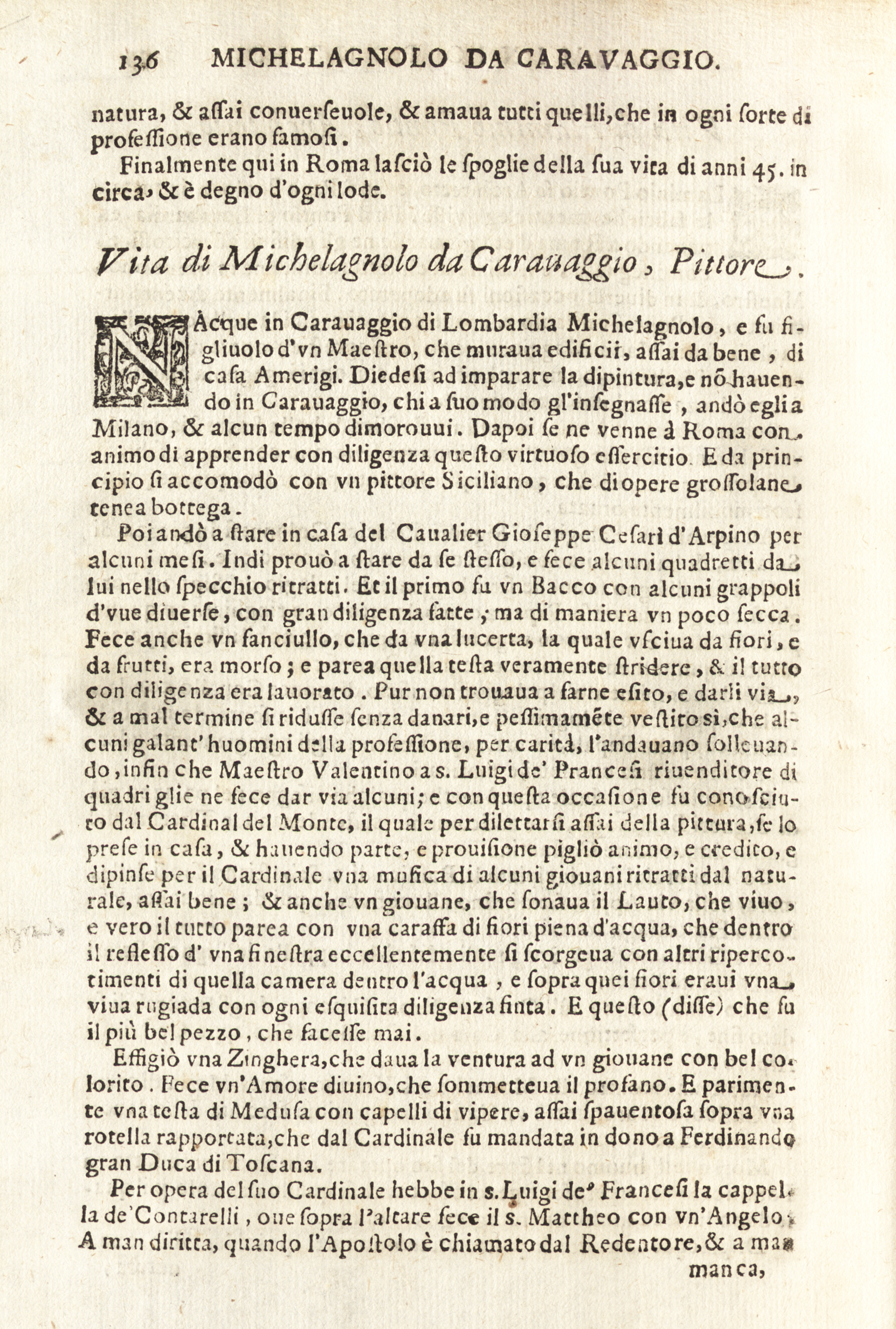
Giovanni Baglione's Life of Michelagnolo da Caravaggio, published in 1642

Giovanni Baglione in his 1642 biography about Caravaggio reported that the first versions of both paintings were rejected:

"The panels at first had been painted in a different style, but because they did not please the patron, Cardinal Sannesio took them; in their place he painted the two oil paintings that can be seen there today, since he did not use any other medium. And – so to speak – Fortune and Fame carried him along."

This report is the only historical source for the well-known story. Although the biography was written decades after the events, its veracity has generally been accepted. Baglione provided no further explanation about the reasons and circumstances of the rejection but modern scholarship put forward several theories and conjectures. The first versions of the paintings were obviously acquired by Giacomo Sannesio, secretary of the Sacra Consulta and an avid collector of art. Caravaggio's biographer, Giulio Mancini mentioned these paintings being in the collection of Cardinal Sannesio around 1620 but he thought them retouched copies of the originals. The paintings reappeared in an inventory of Francesco Sannesio, Cardinal Giacomo's heir, dated to 19 February 1644 that recorded "two large panels, that represent Saint Peter crucified and the other the conversion of Saint Paul, framed in gold". This time the heirs sold the paintings to the Spanish Viceroy of Naples, Juan Alfonso Enríquez de Cabrera who transported them to Madrid two years later. After his death, the paintings were recorded again in the inventory of his assets on 7 August 1647. At the time "The Martyrdom of Saint Peter" was valued to a total of 3300 ducats, its gilded and carved frame estimated to have a value of 300 ducats in itself. The panel was registered for the last time in the inventory of the possessions of Juan Gaspar Enríquez de Cabrera, the tenth Admiral of Castile, in 1691. After that the first version of the Crucifixion of Peter has disappeared from the documents, and its further fate remains unknown. The painting of this subject in the Museo del Patriarca in Valencia is attributed to Caravaggio and may be the first version.

== Description ==
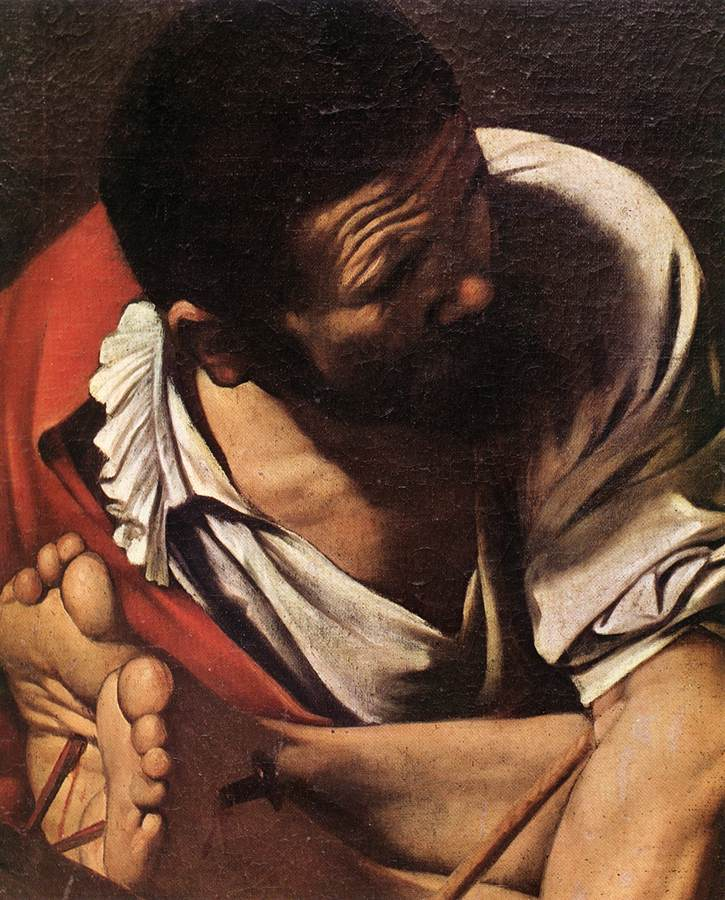
The Crucifixion of Saint Peter (detail)

The painting depicts the martyrdom of St. Peter. According to ancient and well-known tradition, Peter, when he was condemned to death in Rome, requested to be crucified upside-down because he did not believe that a man is worthy to be killed in the same manner as Jesus Christ.

"But now it is time for thee, Peter, to deliver up thy body unto them that take it. Receive it then, ye unto whom it belongeth. I beseech you the executioners, crucify me thus, with the head downward and not otherwise: and the reason wherefore, I will tell unto them that hear" – Acts of Peter

The large canvas shows the three executioners fighting to straighten the cross. Peter is already nailed to the rafters, his hands and feet are bleeding. The apostle is practically naked, which emphasizes his vulnerability. He is an old man, with a gray beard and a bald head, but his aging body is still muscular, suggesting considerable strength. He rises from the cross with great effort, turning his whole body, as if he wants to look towards something that is out of the picture (God). His eyes do not look at the executioners but he has a lost look.

The lifting of the cross requires the efforts of three men. One is pulling it up with ropes while his helpers try to raise the heavy equipment with their arms and shoulders. The yellow-breeched workman, who is crouching under the cross, grabs a shovel that was used to dig a hole into the rocky ground for the stake. The whole process seems disorganized and chaotic as if the sudden heaviness of the cross caught the executioners off-guard. Their faces are largely shielded from the viewer making them characterless executors of an unjust act ordered by an invisible authority. The background of the scene looks like a wall of impenetrable darkness but it is in fact a cliff of rock. This is an allusion to the meaning of Peter's name: the "rock" upon which Christ declared his Church to be built (Gospel of Matthew 16:18).

== Style ==
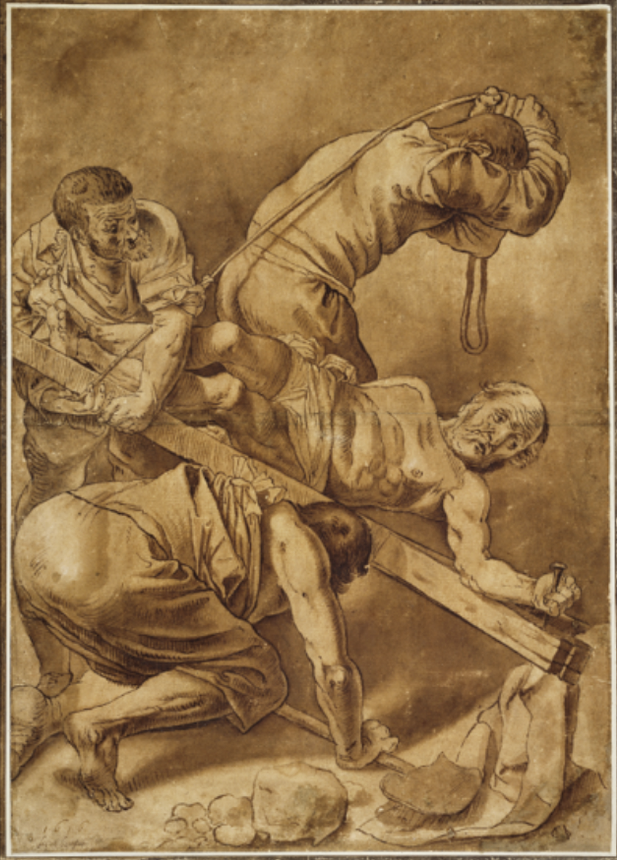
Copy drawing by Gerrit van Honthorst from 1616

According to Denis Mahon, the two paintings in the Cerasi Chapel form "a closely-knit group of sufficiently clear character" with The Inspiration of Saint Matthew in the Contarelli Chapel and The Entombment of Christ in the Pinacoteca Vaticana. He called these four works "the middle group" and stated that they belong to Caravaggio's mature period. Comparing the two paintings in the Cerasi Chapel, Mahon saw the Conversion of Saint Paul "much more animated than its companion" which does not succeed conveying such a vivid sense of movement.

The most striking feature of the painting is its pronounced realism: the saint is "very much the poor fisherman from Bethsaida, and the executioners, their hands heavily veined and reddened, their feet dusty, are toiling workmen", says Helen Langdon. This was the beginning of a new phase in Caravaggio's art where he concentrated on the Christian ethos of humility and salvation through suffering.

== Related works ==
The painting was copied in 1616 by Gerrit van Honthorst when he studied in Rome. His drawing was discovered in the Nasjonalgalleriet in Oslo and published in 1946 by Jan Gerrit van Gelder. The young Honthorst was strongly influenced by the works of Caravaggio, and later became one of the Utrecht caravaggisti who tried to emulate the naturalism and tenebrosity of the Italian painter. Honthorst signed and dated the drawing in the lower left-hand corner. He must have observed the painting very carefully because only few details of the original were omitted. This copy drawing proves that the two Caravaggios in the Cerasi Chapel were already held in high regard a few years after they had been installed.

Some scholars have identified the first version of the Crucifixion with a painting now in the Hermitage Museum in St. Petersburg, but this is not generally accepted (in the Hermitage catalog Martyrdom of St. Peter is attributed, with a question mark, to Leonello Spada and dated on the first quarter of the 17th century).

== See also ==
- List of paintings by Caravaggio

== Bibliography ==
- Gash, John (2004). Caravaggio. Chaucer. ISBN 1-904449-22-0.
- Langdon, Helen (1998). Caravaggio: A Life. Farrar, Straus and Giroux. ISBN 0-374-11894-9.
- Robb, Peter (1998). M. Macmillan. ISBN 978-0-312-27474-0.
