= Agents of Roman Congregations =

Agents of Roman Congregations are persons whose business it is to look after the affairs of their patrons at the Roman Curia.

== History ==
The name is derived from the Latin Agens in Rebus, corresponding to the Greek Apocrisiarius (both have specific historical secular uses in the Roman/ Byzantine empires).

Such agents first appear for ecclesiastical matters not at the court of Rome, but at the imperial palace of Constantinople. Owing to the close connection between Church and State under the early Christian emperors and the absence of canons concerning many matters of mixed jurisdiction, the principal bishops found it necessary to maintain agents to look after their interests at the imperial court. Until the French Revolution, the prelates of France maintained similar agents at the royal court of St. Denis.

By the 16th century, various curial congregations had the authority to decide petitions within the area of their own competence. The importance of mediators grew, particularly on behalf of those who could not appear in person.

While serving as Pope Urban VIII's unofficial representative in England, Carlo Rossetti not only managed to persuade some at the English court to banish Roman Catholic priests from England, rather than execute them, but also relayed requests for funds from Queen Henrietta Maria through his Barberini patrons. As a cardinal, Alessandro Albani furthered the interests of the governments of Austria, Savoy and Britain against those of France and Spain.

The agents often acted as facilitators, helping to move requests or information through the curial bureaucracy. In modern times the agents of the Roman Congregations were employed by bishops or private persons to transact their affairs in the pontifical courts. If it is a question of papal favors, such as dispensations or increased faculties, these agents prepare the proper paperwork, pay the filing fee and call repeatedly on the officials of the proper congregation until an answer is obtained.

As rector of the Pontifical Irish College, Paul Cullen often acted as Roman agent for the Irish hierarchy. His successor, Tobias Kirby. was rector for forty-one years, during which time he acted as agent for Irish, Australian, Canadian, and American bishops. Irish Benedictine Bernard Smith was Roman procurator for the English and American Benedictine congregations, and Roman agent for at least 22 American dioceses and several American religious communities.

Under regulations promulgated by Pope Paul VI, it is forbidden for any dicastery official or subaltern "...to act in any way as agent, procurator, or advocate in one's own or in another dicastery."
