= Juan Martínez de Recalde =

Spanish admiral (died 1588)

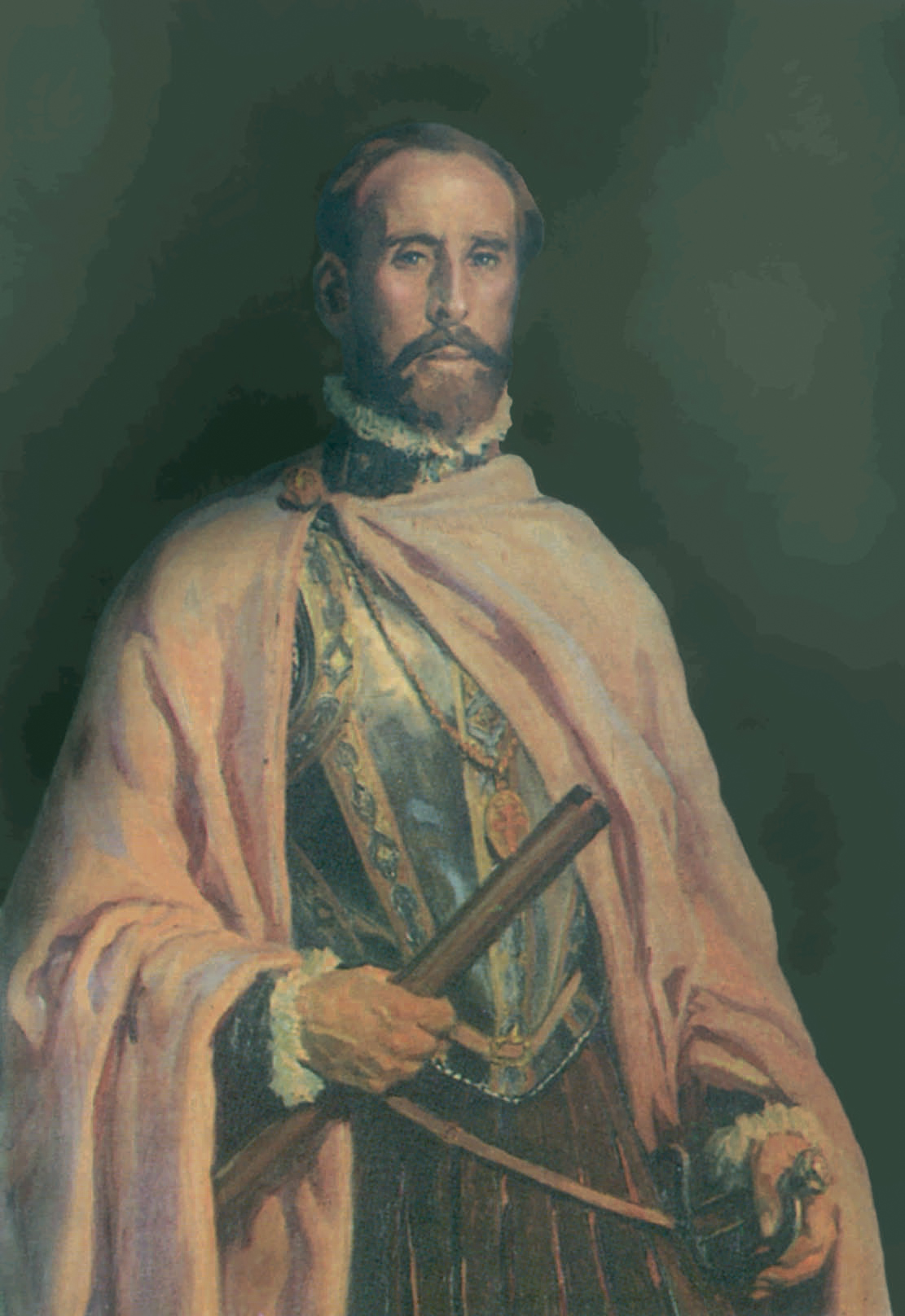
- Born: Juan Martinez de Recalde c. 1540; Bilbao, Biscay, Crown of Castile, Spain
- Died: 22 October 1588 (aged 47-48); A Coruña, Spain
- Military career
- Allegiance: Spain
- Branch: Spanish Navy
- Rank: Admiral
- Nickname: Recalde
- Conflicts: Anglo-Spanish War; Battle of Gravelines
- Awards: Order of Santiago [knight]

Admiral Juan Martínez de Recalde, KOS (c. 1540 – 23 October 1588) was a Spanish Navy officer who was named admiral of the fleet and second-in-command of the Spanish Armada, and commanded the San Juan de Portugal. He was a knight of the Order of Santiago.

== Life and career ==
Juan Martínez de Recalde was born in Bilbao around 1540. He joined the Spanish Navy by entering the Biscay Squadron. He commanded an escort of three fleets to the Indies. He gained fame when he was instrumental in the rescue of a gold-laden galleon at Madeira Island, as a result of which he was awarded command of the Laredo Fleet. He became linked with the influential Admiral Álvaro de Bazán. It was under de Bazán's command that de Recalde took part in two expeditions to the Azores in the early 1580s.

Later that decade, he was granted command of an operation to oppose the English in Ireland, where he landed a number of troops. He was appointed as Admiral of the Fleet which would spearhead a planned invasion of England, an operation under the overall command of the Duke of Medina-Sidonia. He commanded the Biscayan squadron in the battle, but rather than command that squadron's flagship, the Santa Ana a 30-gun vessel, he commanded the vice-flagship of the principal squadron, the San Juan de Portugal a larger, 50-gun ship. He was also second-in-command of the entire fleet. Despite his role, de Recalde had little operational power, and lacking support from the Duke, he underwent a number of battles below fighting strength. In addition, although he was second-in-command, he would have not gained operational command of the fleet had the Duke died; this would have instead passed to the nobly born Don Alonso Martínez de Leiva.

He was separated from the fleet in one skirmish in July 1588, and had to battle with several of the most powerful English ships. Although he survived the battle, he lost a significant number of men, and his ships suffered heavy damage. Towards the end of the operation, he was forced to put into port in Ireland, and then returned to A Coruña, suffering from fever and battle wounds. He died a few days after his squadron docked at the port.

== Bibliography ==
- Martin, Colin; Parker, Geoffrey (1999) [1988]. The Spanish Armada. Manchester University Press. ISBN 1-901341-14-3.
