= Nicola Grimaldi I =

Italian Catholic cardinal (1645–1717)

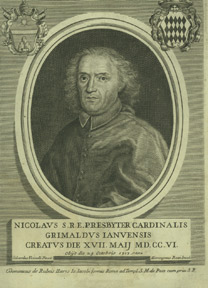

Orders
- Created cardinal: May 17, 1706

Personal details
- Born: 1645 Naples
- Died: 25 October 1717 (aged 71–72) Rome

Nicola Grimaldi (1645–1717) was born at the Castello della Pietra, Naples, a member of the noble Grimaldi family of Genoa.

== Career ==
During the pontificate of Pope Innocent XI he became a governor of several cities in the Papal States. He was created a cardinal in the consistory of May 17, 1706, the same year in which he became the papal legate in Bologna. In 1716 he became Prefect of the Sacred Consulta a position he held until his death.

== Death ==
Grimaldi died at his palazzo in Rome on October 25, 1717, and was buried in the Capuchin Church of Santissima Concezione, Rome.
