= Sacra Consulta =

The Sacred Congregation of the Consulta or Sacra Consulta was a dicastery of the Roman Curia. It was set up as a 'special commission' by pope Paul IV in 1559 and officialised on 22 January 1588 by Pope Sixtus V in the papal bull Immensa Aeterni Dei. Sixtus named it the 'Congregation over the consultations of the ecclesiastical state' (Congregatio decimoquarta pro consultationibus negociorum Status Ecclesiastici) and established its composition of four cardinals, the Secretary of State as prefect and a suitable number of prelates (around eight), one of whom would act as secretary.

== Jurisdiction ==
It interpreted laws and resolved administrative, jurisdictional and feudal questions such as vassals' appeals against their barons regarding their feudal obligations. It acted as a supreme court for disputes between cities and their governors, making it a forerunner of the modern Italian Council of State. Pope Clement XII (1730–40) built the palazzo della Consulta on the piazza del Quirinale as its headquarters, housing eight prelates, though the court actually held its sessions in the palazzo di Montecitorio or in rooms in the Palazzo apostolico.

It was suppressed in 1809 but revived in 1814 after the French released Pope Pius VII. In 1833 Pope Gregory XVI did not abolish the court when he abolished all the other competencies of the Secretariat of State. It finally ceased to operate on 20 September 1870 when the Papal States were abolished.

== List of prefects ==
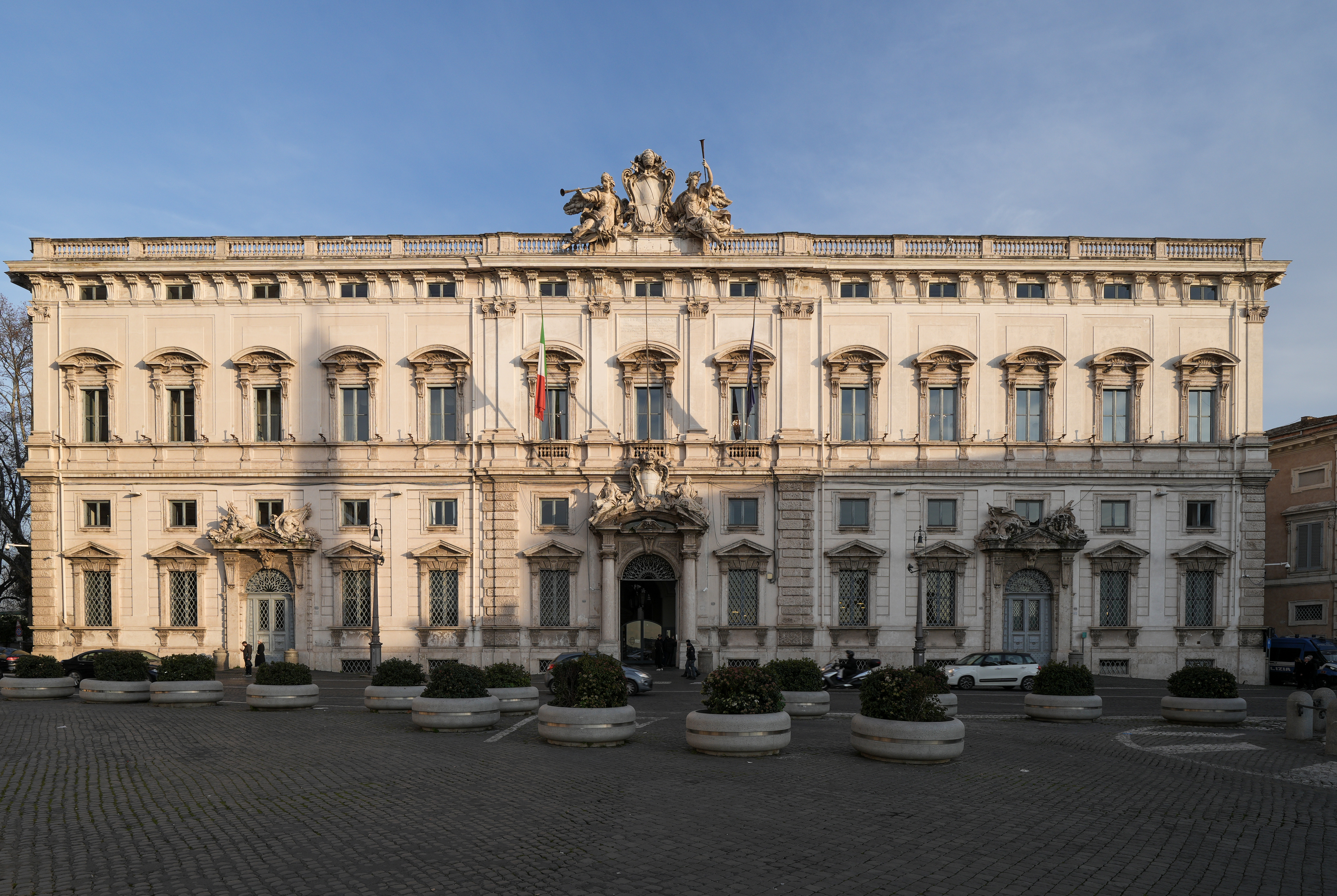
The Palazzo della Consulta in Rome housed the Congregazione della Consulta until 1870.

Generally a cardinal nephew held the office of prefect, though there were two exceptions to this rule:

- Domenico Pinelli, made prefect by Gregory XIV in 1590
- Bonifazio Bevilacqua, appointed by Clement VIII in 1599.

Pope Alexander VII (1655–67) ended the cardinal nephews' influence on the Consulta. The other prefects were:

- Nicola Grimaldi † (1707 - 1716, died in office)
- Niccolò Maria Lercari (1724–1730), as Secretary of State
- Antonio Banchieri † (1730 - 1733, died in office)
- Silvio Valenti Gonzaga † (1740 - 1756, died in office)
- Alberico Archinto † (1756 - 1758, died in office)
- Ignazio Gaetano Boncompagni Ludovisi † (1775 - 1789, resigned)
- Giuseppe Maria Doria Pamphilj † (1797 - 1799, resigned)
- Ercole Consalvi † (1800 - 1806, resigned)
- Tommaso Bernetti (1831–1836), as Secretary of State
- Mario Mattei † (1841 - 1848, resigned)

== Bibliography ==
- (in Italian) Gaetano Moroni, Dizionario di erudizione storico-ecclesiastica, vol. XVI, Venezia 1842, p. 181-185.
- (in French) Philippe Bountry, Souverain et Pontife. Recherches prosopographiques sur la Curie Romaine à l'âge de la Restauration (1814-1846), Publications de l'École française de Rome, 2002, pp. 140–149.
