= Congregation of the Vatican Press =

Organ of the Roman Curia

The Holy Congregation of the Vatican Press (Latin: Congregatio pro typographia vaticana) was an organ of the Roman Curia.

The Holy Congregation of the Vatican Press was one of the Vatican bodies set up by Pope Sixtus V on 22 January 1588, in his papal bull Immensa Aeterni Dei.

The Holy Congregation of the Vatican Press was in charge of the printing press which had been installed in the Vatican by Pope Pius IV, which also printed Chinese and Japanese language works and employed the celebrated humanist Paolo Manuzio.

Sixtus V gave it a more specifically religious role, printing all works approved by the Catholic Church, particularly those of Saint Ambrose, a particular favourite of Sixtus. It was suppressed by Pope Paul V.
