= Immensa aeterni Dei =

1588 apostolic constitution by Pope Sixtus V

Immensa aeterni Dei ("The immeasurable [wisdom of] the eternal God") is an apostolic constitution in the form of a papal bull issued by Pope Sixtus V on 22 January 1588. The constitution reorganized the Roman Curia, establishing permanent congregations of cardinals to advise the pope on various subjects.

== Content ==
The one role of the document was to provide instruction in condemning or correcting literature which were against Catholic doctrine. The document also had the authority to give permission for selected individuals to read books which were forbidden. It has since been superseded, most recently by Pope Francis's constitution Praedicate Evangelium.

The Constitution also created the Congregation of Rites, which at that time included jurisdiction over Causes of the Saints.

== Congregations ==
Immensa aeterni Dei called for the formation of 15 permanent congregations:

- Congregation of the Inquisition
- Congregation of the Segnatura
- Congregation for the Erection of Churches and Consistorial Provisions
- Congregation for Sacred Rites and Ceremonies
- Congregation of the Index of Forbidden Books
- Congregation of the Council
- Congregation of Regulars
- Congregation of Bishops
- Congregation of the Vatican Press
- Congregation of the Annona, for the provisioning of Rome and the provinces
- Congregation of the Navy
- Congregation of the Public Welfare
- Congregation of the Sapienza
- Congregation of Roads, Bridges, and Waters
- Congregation of State Consultations
