= The Martyrdom of Saint Andrew (Rubens) =

Painting by Peter Paul Rubens

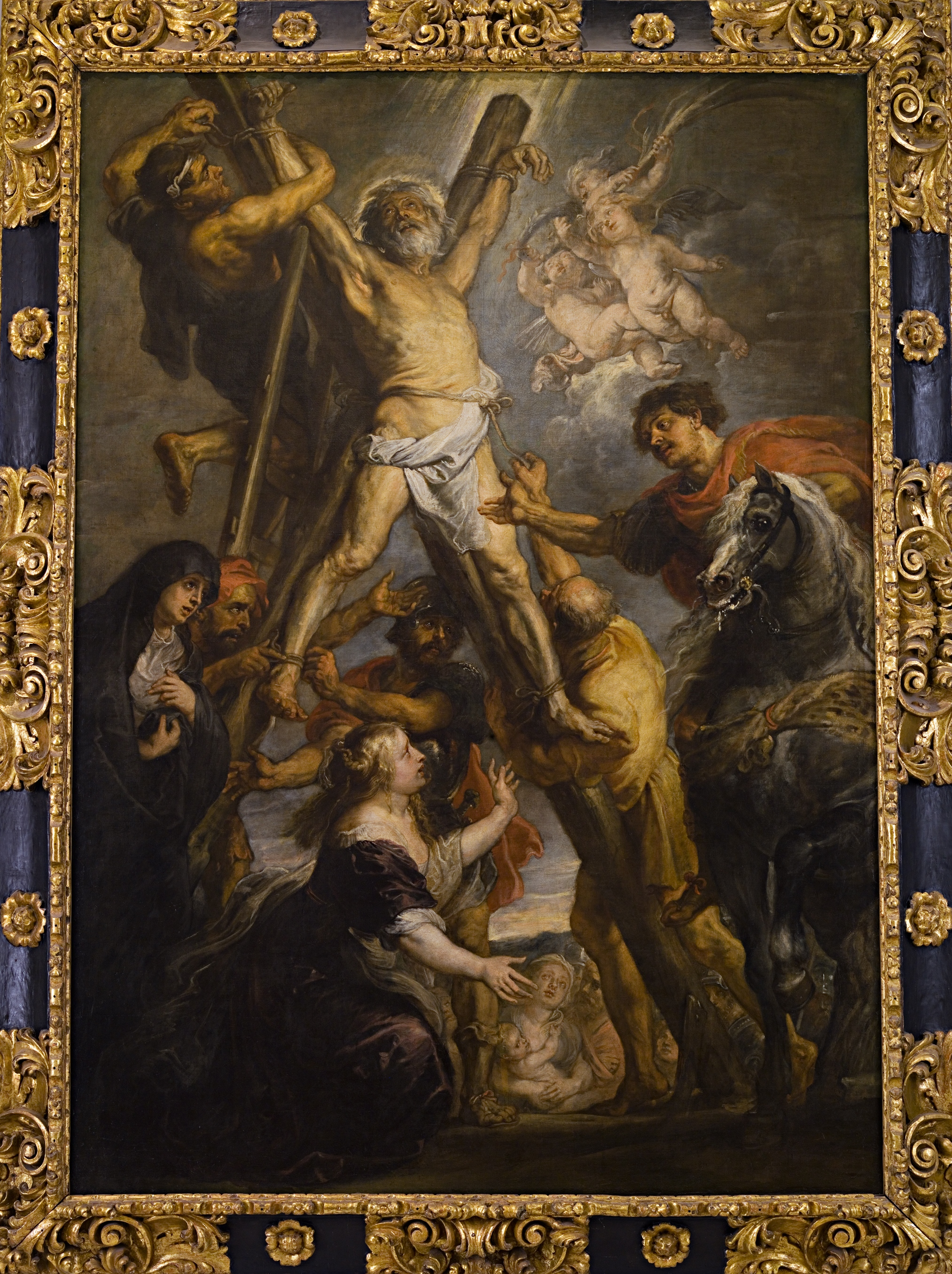

The Martyrdom of Saint Andrew is an oil on canvas painting by Peter Paul Rubens, which since 1989 has been in the collection of the Fundación Carlos de Amberes, Madrid. It was painted in 1639, the year before the artist's death.

The work was a commission from Jan van Vucht from Flanders living in Madrid. He modelled its composition on a painting of the same subject which his teacher Otto van Veen had painted for the high altar of the church dedicated to Saint Andrew in Antwerp. A drawing after Rubens' painting with a few variations survives in the British Museum in London.

On van Vucht's death in 1639 he left the painting to the Hospital de San Andrés de los Flamencos, which had been founded in 1594 by Carlos de Amberes. When the hospital was abolished in 1844 the painting was assigned to the El Escorial Monastery but after the hospital was renovated it was moved back there in 1891, this time in its new chapel. From 1978 to 1989 it temporarily formed part of the Museo del Prado collection.

From 28 May to 1 September 2019 it was displayed in the International Museum of the Baroque in Puebla de Zaragoza, the first time the work had been exhibited in South America. It was then displayed from 5 September to 8 December 2019 at the Museo Nacional de Arte in Mexico City, in an exhibition showing Rubens' influence on New Spanish artists such as José Juárez, Cristóbal de Villalpando and Baltasar de Echave y Rioja.
