= Conversion on the Way to Damascus =

Painting by Caravaggio

The Conversion on the Way to Damascus
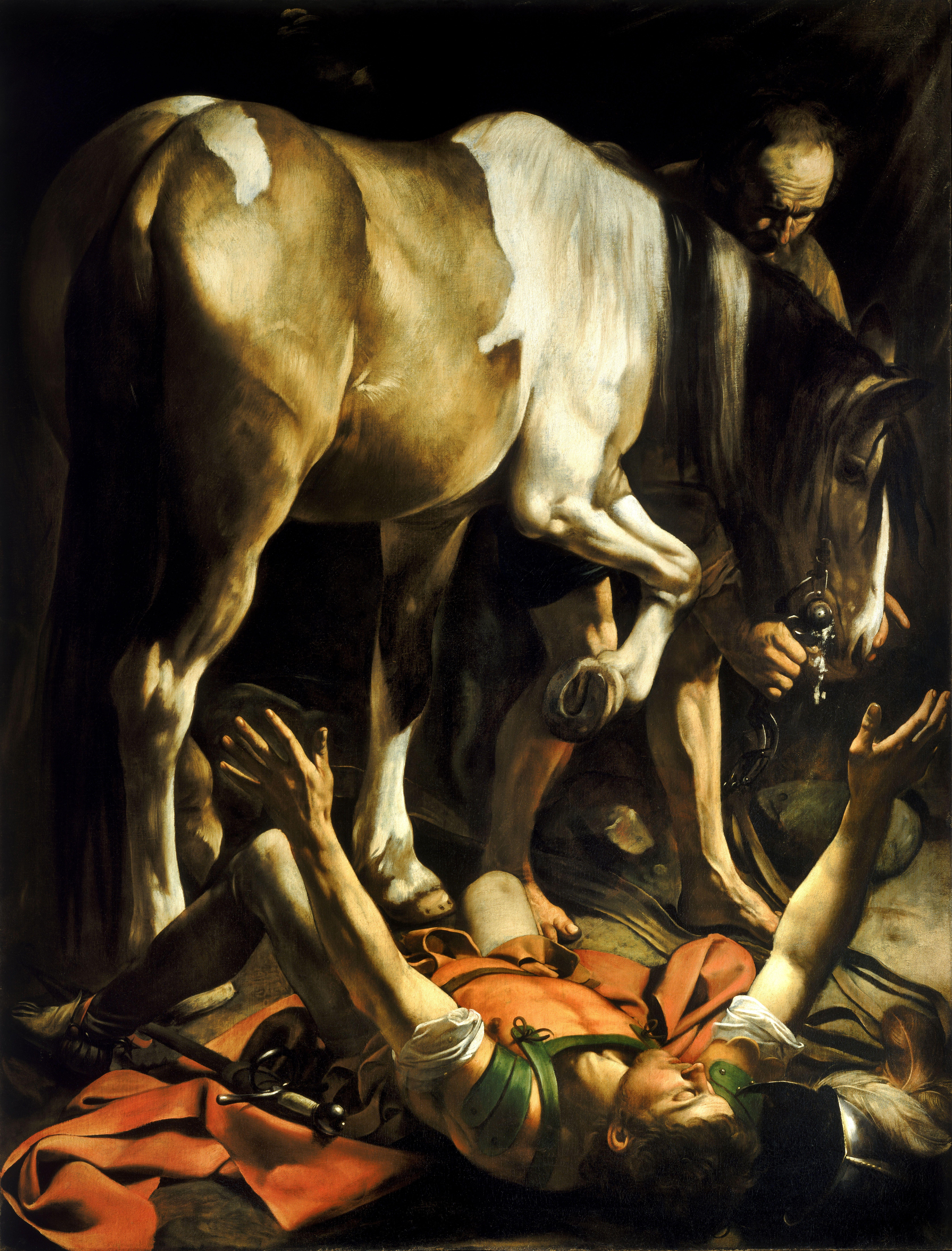
- Artist: Caravaggio
- Year: 1601
- Medium: Oil on canvas
- Dimensions: 230 cm × 175 cm (91 in × 69 in)
- Location: Santa Maria del Popolo, Rome

The Conversion on the Way to Damascus (Conversione di San Paolo) is a work by Caravaggio, painted in 1601 for the Cerasi Chapel of the church of Santa Maria del Popolo, in Rome. Across the chapel is a second Caravaggio depicting the Crucifixion of Saint Peter. On the altar between the two is the Assumption of the Virgin Mary by Annibale Carracci.

== History ==
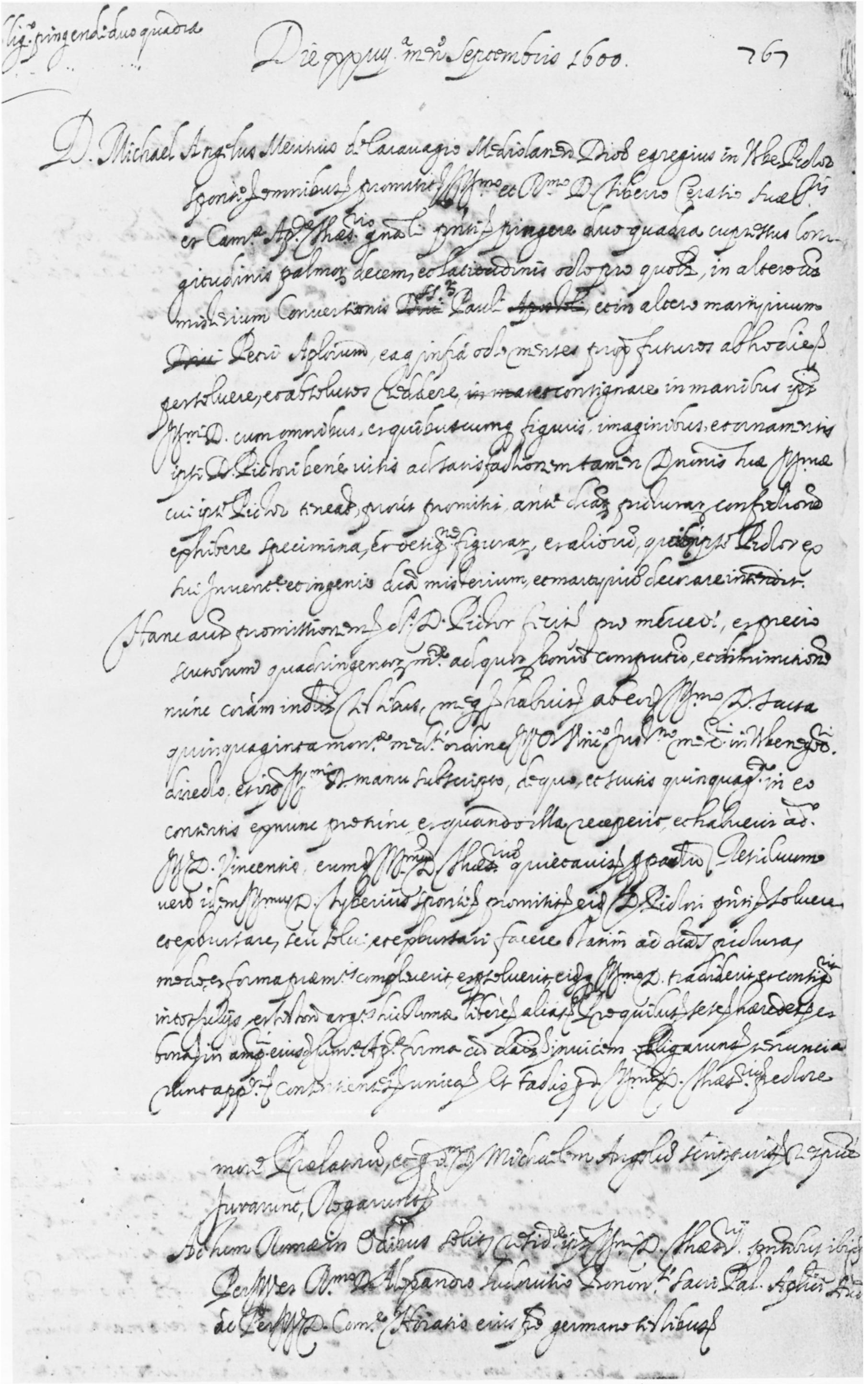
A notary's copy of the contract between Caravaggio and Cerasi.

The two lateral paintings of the Cerasi Chapel were commissioned in September 1600 by Monsignor Tiberio Cerasi, Treasurer-General to Pope Clement VIII who purchased the chapel from the Augustinian friars on 8 July 1600 and entrusted Carlo Maderno to rebuild the small edifice in Baroque style. The contract for the altarpiece with Carracci has not been preserved but it is generally assumed that the document had been signed somewhat earlier, and Caravaggio had to take into consideration the other artist's work and the overall iconographic programme of the chapel.

Although much has been said about the supposed rivalry between the painters, there is no historical evidence about any serious tensions. Both were successful and sought-after artists in Rome. Caravaggio gained the Cerasi commission right after his celebrated works in the Contarelli Chapel had been finished, and Carracci was busy creating his great fresco cycle in the Palazzo Farnese. In these circumstances there was little reason for them to regard each other as business rivals, states Denis Mahon.

The contract signed on 24 September 1600 stipulates that "the distinguished painter, Michelangelo Merisi da Caravaggio" will paint two large cypress panels, ten palms high and eight palms wide, representing the conversion of Saint Paul and the martyrdom of Saint Peter within eight months for the price of 400 scudi. The contract gave a free hand to the painter to choose the figures, persons and ornaments depicted in the way as he saw fit, "to the satisfaction however of his Lordship", and he was also obliged to submit preparatory studies before the execution of the paintings. Caravaggio received 50 scudi as advance payment from the banker Vincenzo Giustiniani with the rest earmarked to be paid on completion. The dimensions specified for the panels are virtually the same as the size of the existing canvasses.

When Tiberio Cerasi died on 3 May 1601 Caravaggio was still working on the paintings as attested by an avviso dated 5 May mentioned that the chapel was being decorated by the hand of the "famosissimo Pittore", Michelangelo da Caravaggio. A second avviso dated 2 June proves that Caravaggio was still at work on the paintings a month later. He completed them sometime before 10 November when he received the final instalment from the heirs of Tiberio Cerasi, the Fathers of the Ospedale della Consolazione. The total compensation for the paintings was reduced to 300 scudi for unknown reasons.

The paintings were finally installed in the chapel on 1 May 1605 by the woodworker Bartolomeo who received four scudi and fifty baiocchi from the Ospedale for his work.

The Odescalchi Balbi version of the painting

The first version

Giovanni Baglione in his 1642 biography about Caravaggio reports that the first versions of both paintings were rejected:

"The panels at first had been painted in a different style, but because they did not please the patron, Cardinal Sannesio took them; in their place he painted the two oil paintings that can be seen there today, since he did not use any other medium. And - so to speak - Fortune and Fame carried him along."

This report is the only historical source for the well-known story. Although the biography was written decades after the events, its veracity is generally accepted. Baglione provided no further explanation about the reasons and circumstances of the rejection but modern scholarship has put forward several theories and conjectures. The first versions of the paintings were obviously acquired by Giacomo Sannesio, secretary of the Sacra Consulta and an avid collector of art. The first Conversion of Saint Paul ended up in the Odescalchi Balbi Collection. It is a much brighter and more Mannerist canvas, with an angel-sustained Jesus reaching down towards a blinded Paul.

X-ray examination revealed another, almost complete version of the scene under the present painting, in which the saint is shown fallen to the ground, on the right of the canvas, his eyes open, his forehead lined, and his right hand raised.

== Description ==
The conversion of Paul from persecutor to apostle is a well-known biblical story. According to the New Testament, Saul of Tarsus was a zealous Pharisee, who intensely persecuted the followers of Jesus, even participating in the stoning of Stephen. He was on his way from Jerusalem to Damascus to arrest the Christians of the city.

As he went he drew near Damascus, and suddenly a light from heaven shone around him. He fell to the ground and heard a voice saying to him, “Saul, Saul, why do you persecute Me?" He said, “Who are You, Lord?” The Lord said, “I am Jesus, whom you are persecuting.”

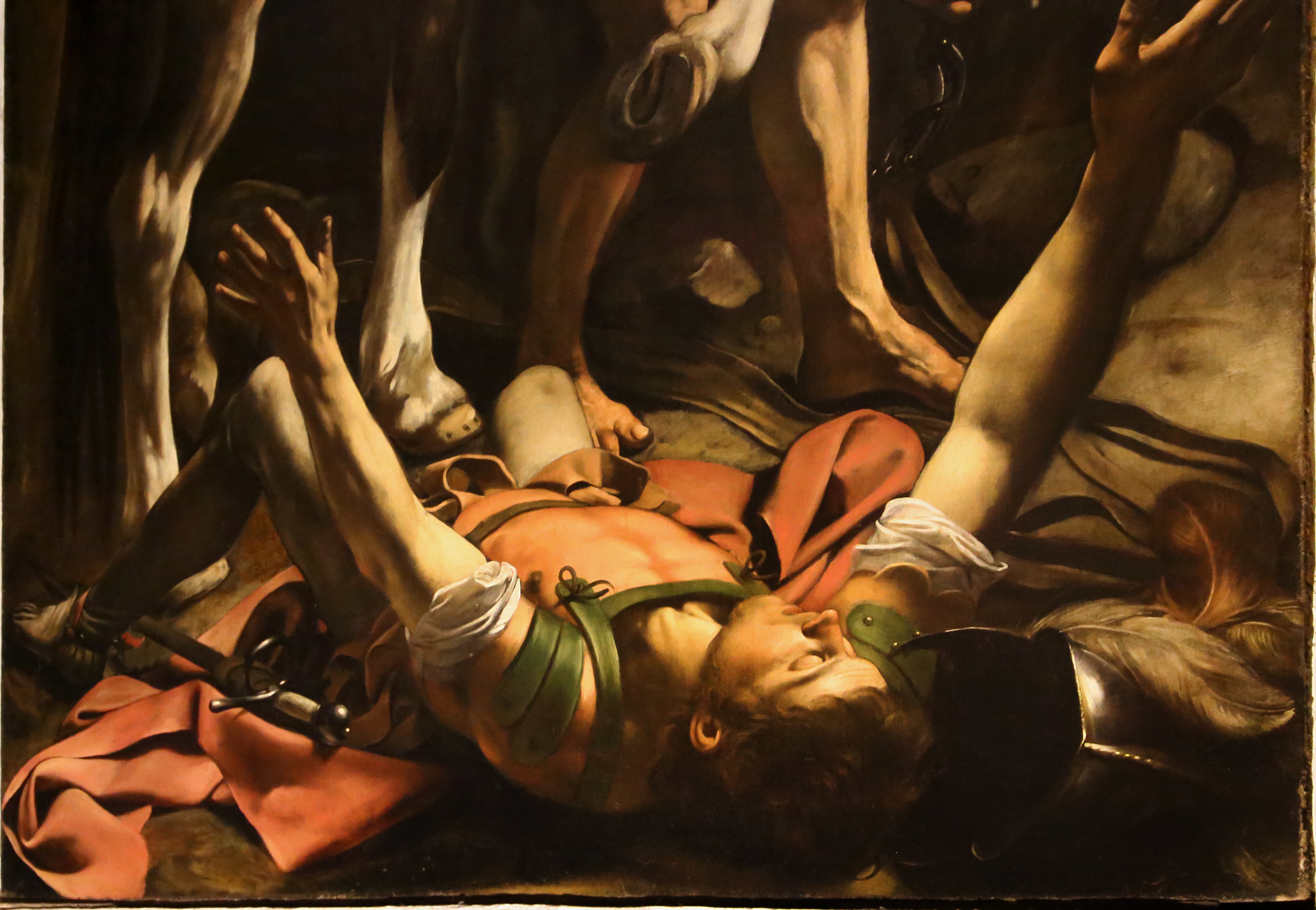
Saul is almost embracing his vision

The painting depicts this moment recounted in the Acts of the Apostles, except Caravaggio has Saul falling off a horse (which is not mentioned in the story) on the road to Damascus, seeing a blinding light and hearing the voice of Jesus. For Saul this is a moment of intense religious ecstasy: he is lying on the ground, supine, eyes shut, with his legs spread and his arms raised upward as if embracing his vision. The saint is a muscular young man, and his garment looks like a Renaissance version of a Roman soldier's attire: orange and green muscle cuirass, pteruges, tunic and boots. His plumed helmet fell off his head and his sword is lying by his side. The red cape almost looks like a blanket under his body. The horse is passing over him led by an old groom, who points his finger at the ground. He had calmed down the animal, and now prevents it treading upon Saul. The huge steed has a mottled brown and cream coat; it is still foaming at the mouth, and its hoof is hanging in the air.

The scene is lit by a strong light but the three figures are engulfed by an almost impenetrable darkness. A few faint rays on the right evoke Jesus' epiphany but these are not the real source of the lighting, and the groom remains seemingly oblivious to the presence of the divine. Because the skewbald horse is unsaddled, it is suggested that the scene takes place in a stable instead of an open landscape.

This painting has helped form the myth of Paul being on a horse although the text does not mention a horse at all. Rather in Acts 9:8 it says that afterwards "Saul got up from the ground and opened his eyes, but could not see a thing. So they took him by the hand and led him into Damascus."

== Style ==
=== Iconography ===
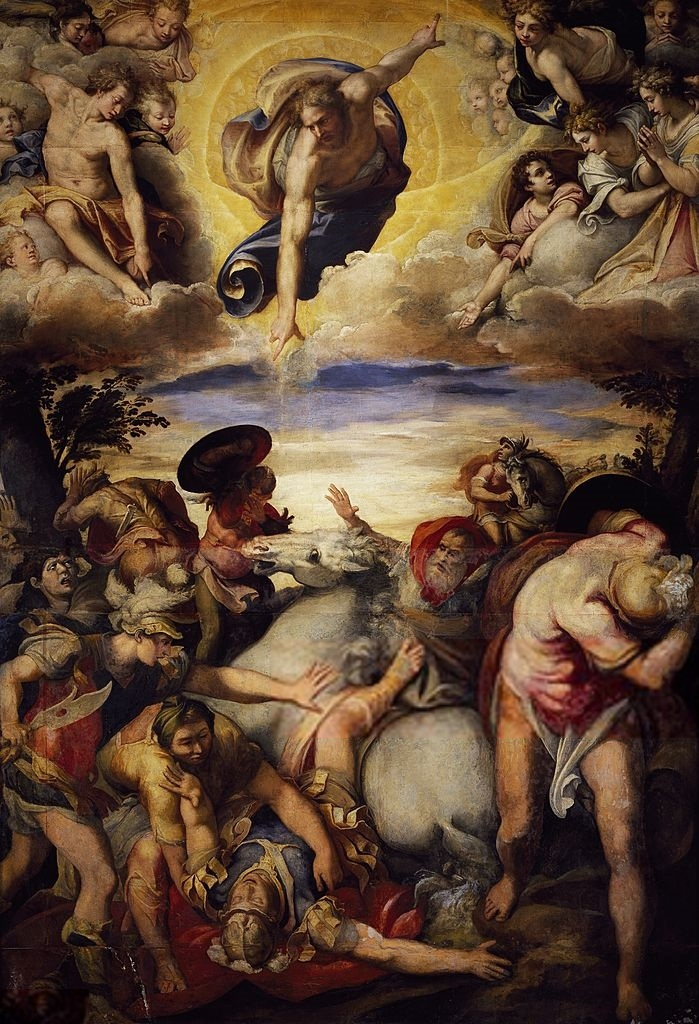
Taddeo Zuccari's Conversion of Saint Paul in the Church of San Marcello al Corso

Well-established iconographic tradition stipulated how the Conversion of Paul should be depicted in Renaissance and Baroque art. Its characteristic elements were a rearing, panicked horse—although there is no mention of a horse in the Bible—with Saul lying on the ground, Jesus appearing in the sky and a retinue of soldiers reacting to the events. This is how Taddeo Zuccari, one of the most renowned painters in Caravaggio's Rome, portrayed the scene on a large altarpiece in the Church of San Marcello al Corso around 1560. The figure of Paul in the Cerasi Conversion was derived from a model by Raphael via Zuccari. Raphael's version was part of his Raphael Cartoons, a series of tapestries created for the Sistine Chapel in 1515–16.

"If we could turn Raphael's Saint Paul in such a way that his head would touch the lower frame and the length of his body would be directed more or less orthogonally inward, we would have a figure similar to that in Caravaggio's painting", observed Walter Friedlaender. He also suggested that the inspiration for the horse was Albrecht Dürer's most famous print, The Large Horse (1505), whose main subject has the same bulky, powerful hindquarters and the rest of its body is seen from a similar oblique angle.

Another possible source for the painting is a four-block woodcut attributed to Ugo da Carpi (c. 1515–20) whose central detail depicts Saul on the ground and a groom trying to calm his panicked horse and leading the animal away. This is the only known example among the antecedents which represents exactly the same moment as Caravaggio's painting. A more obvious, although less close precursor was the Conversion of Saint Paul by Michelangelo in the Pauline Chapel (1542–45) where a rearing horse and a soldier holding its bridle are conspicuous elements in the middle of the crowded scene. A painting that Caravaggio must have known was a very unusual Conversion which Moretto da Brescia painted for the Mint of Milan in 1540–41. This scene consists only two figures: Saul and his horse, and the horse strangely dominates the painting. Moretto was probably inspired by a similar Conversion attributed to Parmigianino (1527).

Although some details and motifs may have been borrowed or inspired by these artworks, the pared-down composition and the intense spiritual drama of the Cerasi Conversion was a novelty without any direct iconographic precedent at the time. It represented a break with the tradition that even Caravaggio's own previous version more or less followed.

=== Tenebrism ===
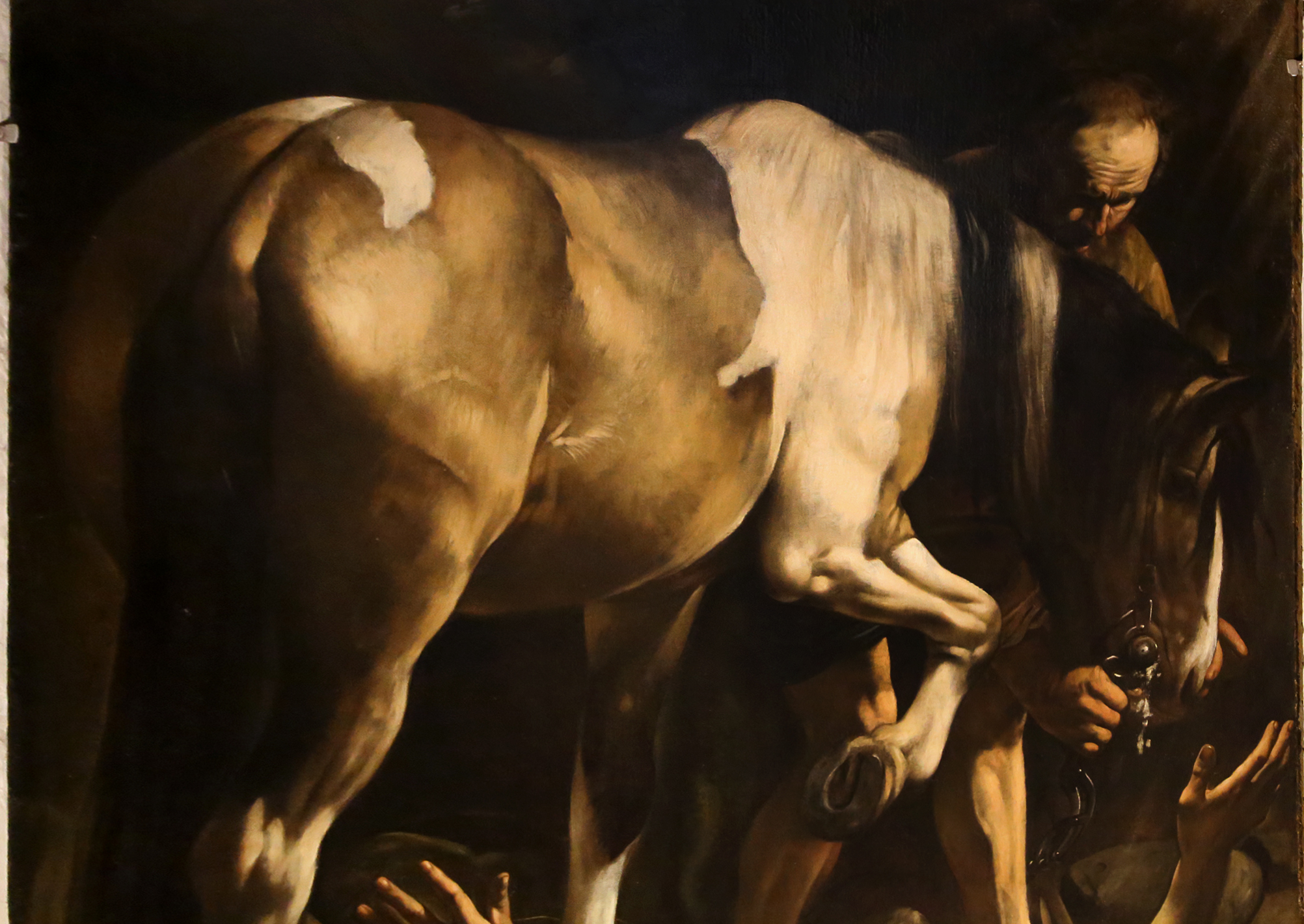
Tenebrism creates strong contrasts between lighted and dark areas of the painting

Most of Caravaggio's paintings after 1600 depicted religious subjects, and were placed in churches. According to Denis Mahon, the two paintings in the Cerasi Chapel form "a closely-knit group of sufficiently clear character" with The Inspiration of Saint Matthew in the Contarelli Chapel and The Entombment of Christ in the Pinacoteca Vaticana. He called these four works "the middle group" and stated that they belong to Caravaggio's mature period. Comparing the two paintings in the Cerasi Chapel, Mahon saw the Conversion of Saint Paul "much more animated than its companion". This is conveyed solely by the ingenious use of the light because Caravaggio eschewed any but the slightest movements. This way he rendered "the scene unclear, mysterious and therefore curiously mouvementé."

External videos
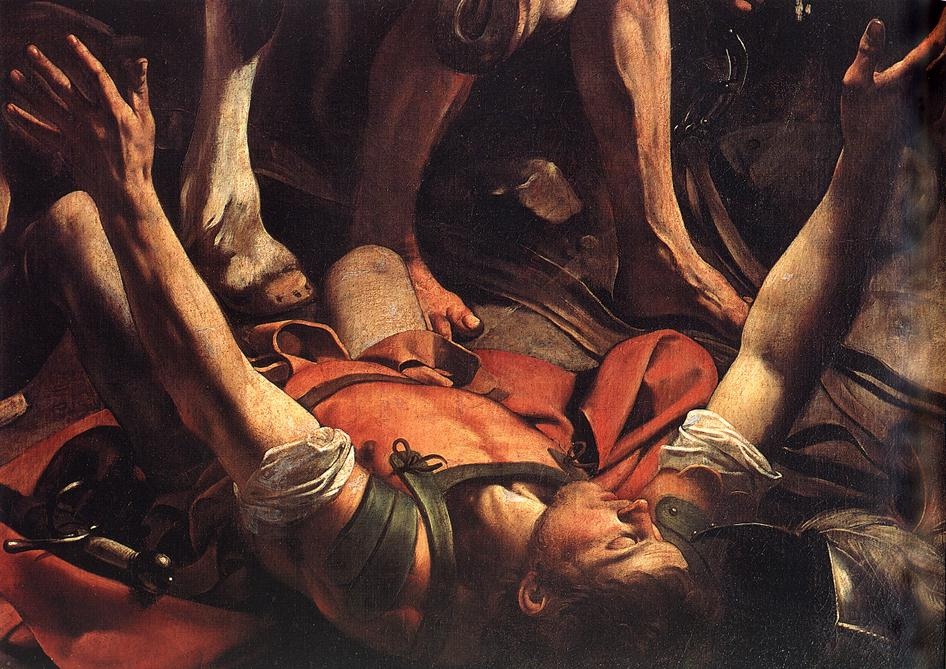
- Caravaggio, The Conversion of St. Paul, Smarthistory

Caravaggio's style of tenebrism, where forms in paintings emerge from a dark background with usually one source of stark light, created dramatic effects with its strong contrasts. This lighting was evoking spiritual drama in the Conversion of Saint Paul. The brighter areas are juxtaposed with "heavy dark patches, especially deep beneath the horse's belly and extending into impenetrable darkness that lies outside and beyond the circular grouping of the three figures". The usual landscape background was dismissed entirely and replaced with an intense concentration on the three figures who compose the scene. The strong light and the enveloping darkness makes this focus even more intense.

The unusual placement of the characters also served to convey the intensity of the moment. Although Saul gets the most light, the attention is given to him in a strange way. Lying on the ground, he is much smaller than the horse, which is also at the center of the painting. Paul's body is foreshortened, and is not facing the viewer, and yet his presence is the most powerful because of his body is pushing into the viewer's space. The position of the horse and especially the front leg, which is hanging in the air, creates even more visual tension. The first compositional draft revealed by the X-ray examination was a more traditional composition with a visible source of divine radiance coming from the left.

== Reception ==
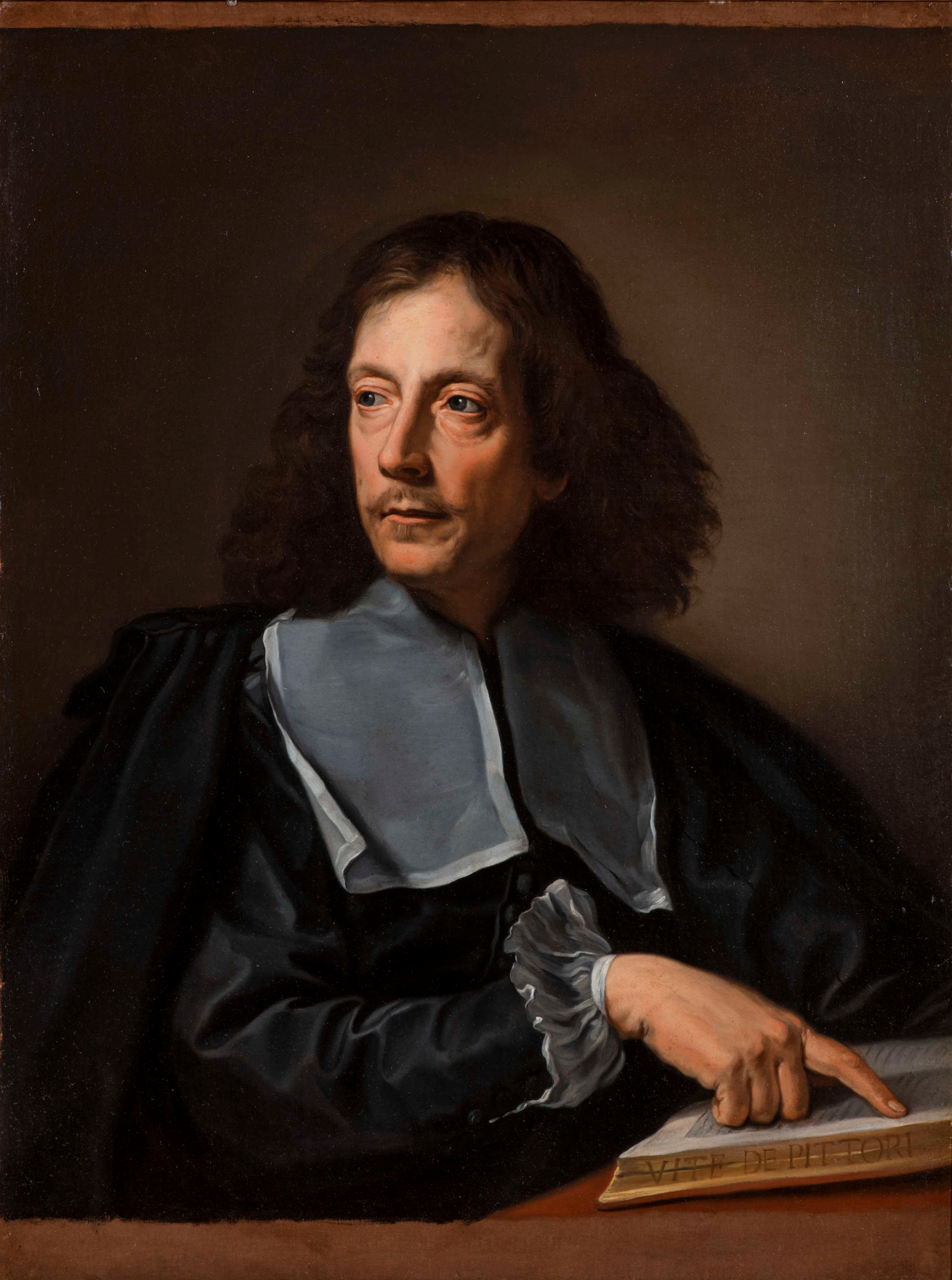
Giovanni Pietro Bellori by Carlo Maratta

Caravaggio was a successful and celebrated artist at the time of the Cerasi commission but the unusual style and composition of the painting gave rise to criticism early on. The first influential art critic who dismissed the painting was Giovanni Pietro Bellori. In 1672 he wrote in The Lives of the Modern Painters, Sculptors and Architects about the Cerasi Chapel:

Caravaggio executed the two lateral paintings, the Crucifixion of Saint Peter and the Conversion of Saint Paul; whose history is completely bereft of action.

This is a more scathing criticism than it sounds because Bellori claimed that "painting is nothing but the imitation of human action"; thus a painting completely without action was a non-painting for him. The deviations from the traditional iconography all made the painting "bereft of action" in his eyes: the prominence of the horse instead of the biblical hero; the absence of Jesus; and the focusing upon an insignificant moment in the story after the fall of Saul instead of its real climax, the divine epiphany. According to the art historian Lorenzo Pericolo, the narrative momentum of the painting was undoubtedly disrupted by these decisions, but Caravaggio did this to extend the conventional confines of pictorial narration.

Bellori stands at the head of a long line of hostile commentary. The art historian Jacob Burckhardt in his traveller's guide to painting in Italy (1855) instanced the Conversion on how "coarse" the compositions of Caravaggio were "when he did not care for expression", criticising that "the horse nearly fills the whole of the picture".

Caravaggio's reputation reached its lowest point in the second half of the 19th century. The most popular travel guides of the period, published by Karl Baedeker, simply omit the two canvases of Caravaggio and the Cerasi Chapel in their very detailed descriptions of Santa Maria del Popolo. The paintings are not mentioned in the fifteen editions published between 1867 and 1909.

In his Transformations (1927), the English art critic Roger Fry says that the Conversion is a combination of melodrama and photographic realism which is typical of the religious paintings of Caravaggio. "The original design of man and horse is not without merit, despite the triviality of observation and insistence on details for their illusive effect, but the whole design comes to pieces when St. Paul is thus wilfully pushed into the scene and the parts have no longer any significance in relation to the whole", he argues. Even in 1953, Bernard Berenson, probably the greatest authority on Italian Renaissance painting in the first half of the 20th century, called the painting a charade:

Nothing more incongruous than the importance given to horse over rider, to dumb beast over saint. Surely more picaresque than holy.

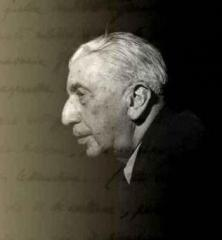
Roberto Longhi

Opinions changed again fundamentally in the middle of the 20th century, when Caravaggio was recognized as one of the greatest painters in the history of Western art. Roberto Longhi wrote in 1952 that, by completely sweeping away the iconographical tradition of the time, Caravaggio offered for public view "what is perhaps the most revolutionary painting in the history of religious art. […] Were it not for the fact that the painting was placed on a side wall, we might wonder how Caravaggio could have had it put on public exhibition without encountering severe criticism, or even an outright rejection."

Another leading scholar at the time, Walter Friedlaender, in his monograph Caravaggio Studies (1955), used his analysis of the Conversion of Saint Paul as an introduction to the art of Caravaggio. He emphasized that both paintings of the Cerasi Chapel "were, in spite of their radically new and unaccustomed conceptions, perfectly fit objects for devotional meditation", because the scenes "are not remote spectacles, far separated from the spectator. They speak directly to him, on his own level. He can understand and share their experiences: the awakening of faith, and the martyrdom of faith."

This appreciation found a literary expression in a poem by Thom Gunn, a young English poet who was highly regarded by British critics in the 1950s. Gunn spent a few months in Rome on a student fellowship in 1953 after graduating at Cambridge, and he was much impressed by the paintings of Caravaggio in the Cerasi Chapel. The poem was published in the Poetry magazine in 1958 under the title In Santa Maria del Popolo ('The Conversion of St. Paul'). It gives an entirely secular reading of the painting, devoid of anything sacred, interpreting it as "the defeat of a yearning for the Absolute which is inevitably denied to man [...], as a sort of defeated Faust."

== See also ==
- List of paintings by Caravaggio
