= Conversion of Paul the Apostle =

Event recounted in the New Testament

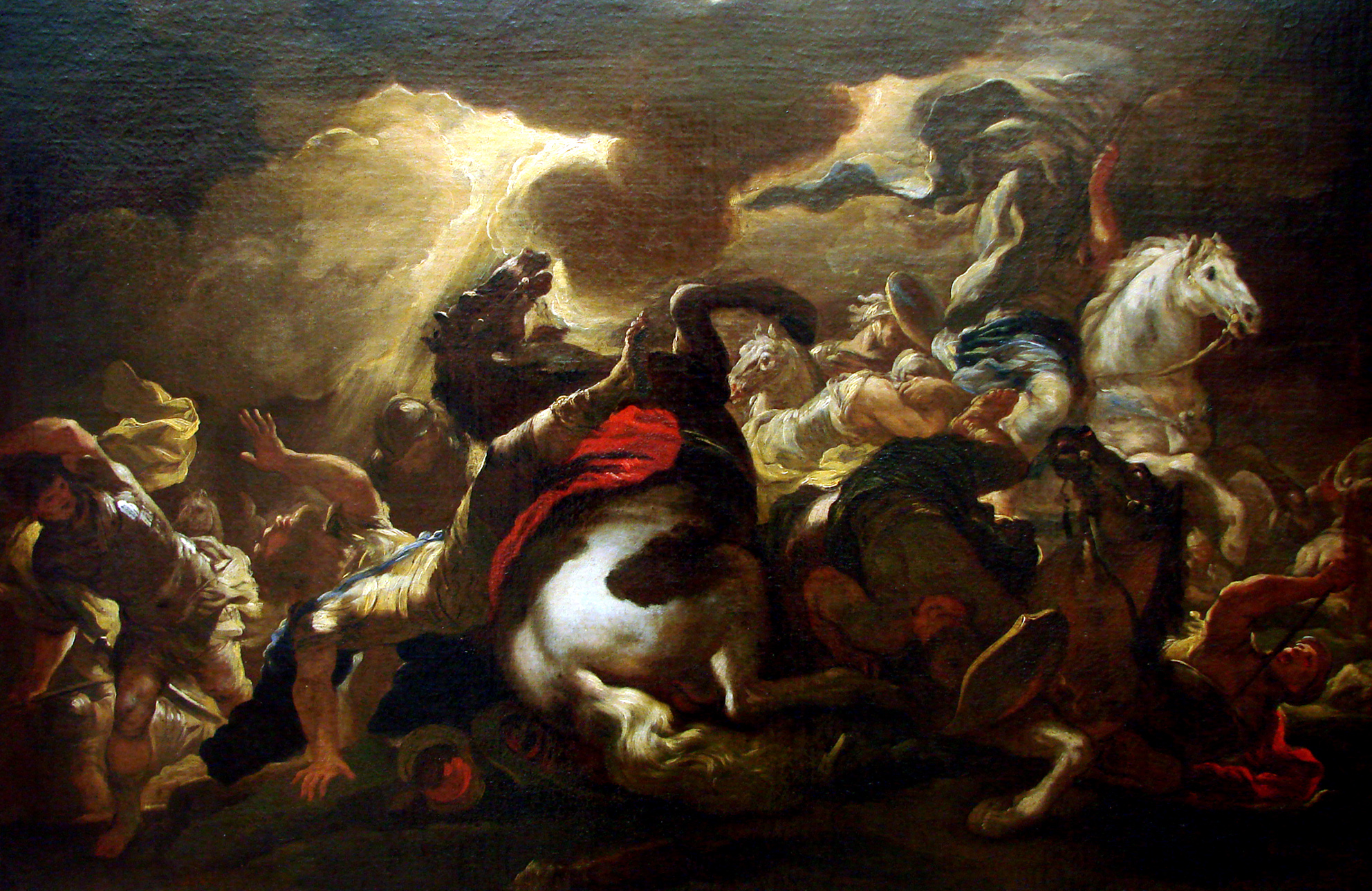
The Conversion of Saint Paul, Luca Giordano, 1690, Museum of Fine Arts of Nancy

The Conversion of Saint Paul, Caravaggio, 1600

The conversion of Paul the Apostle (also the Pauline conversion, Damascene conversion, Damascus Christophany and Paul's transformation on the road to Damascus) was, according to the New Testament, an event in the life of Saul of Tarsus, later Paul the Apostle, that led him to cease persecuting early Christians and to become a follower of Jesus.

== New Testament accounts ==
Paul's conversion experience is discussed in both the Pauline epistles and in the Acts of the Apostles. According to both sources, Saul/Paul was not a follower of Jesus and did not know him before his crucifixion. The narrative of the Book of Acts suggests Paul's conversion occurred four to seven years after the crucifixion of Jesus. The accounts of Paul's conversion experience describe it as miraculous, supernatural, or otherwise revelatory in nature.

=== Before conversion ===
Paul, who also went by Saul, was "a Pharisee of Pharisees" who "intensely persecuted" the followers of Jesus. Paul describes his life before conversion in his Epistle to the Galatians:

For you have heard of my previous way of life in Judaism, how intensely I persecuted the church of God and tried to destroy it. I was advancing in Judaism beyond many of my own age among my people and was extremely zealous for the traditions of my fathers.

— Galatians 1:13–14, NIV

Paul also discusses his pre-conversion life in his Epistle to the Philippians, 3:4–6, and his participation in the stoning of Stephen is described in Acts 7:57–8:3.

=== Pauline epistles ===
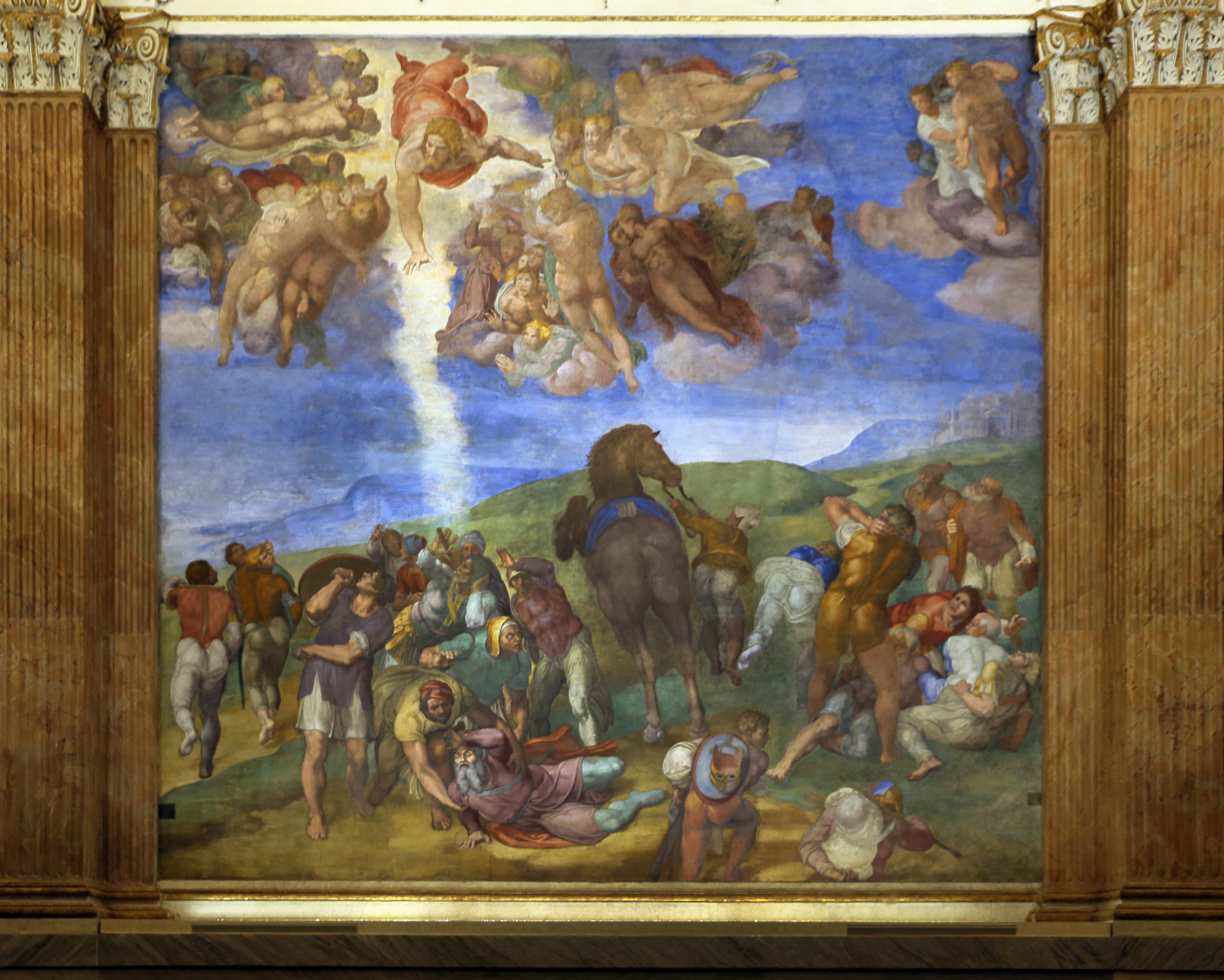
Fresco in the Vatican Cappella Paolina by Michelangelo, 1542–1545

In the Pauline epistles, the description of Paul's conversion experience is brief. The First Epistle to the Corinthians 9:1 and 15:3–8 suggests that Paul saw the risen Christ:

For what I received I passed on to you as of first importance: that Christ died for our sins according to the Scriptures, that he was buried, that he was raised on the third day according to the Scriptures, and that he appeared to Cephas, and then to the Twelve. After that, he appeared to more than five hundred of the brothers and sisters at the same time, most of whom are still living, though some have fallen asleep. Then he appeared to James, then to all the apostles, and last of all he appeared to me also, as to one abnormally born.

— 1 Corinthians 15:3–8, NIV

The Second Epistle to the Corinthians also discusses Paul's experience of revelation. In verse 1 the NIV translation mentions "revelations from the Lord", but other translations, including the NASB, translate that phrase as "revelations of the Lord". The passage begins with Paul seeming to speak about another person, but very quickly he makes it clear he is speaking of himself.

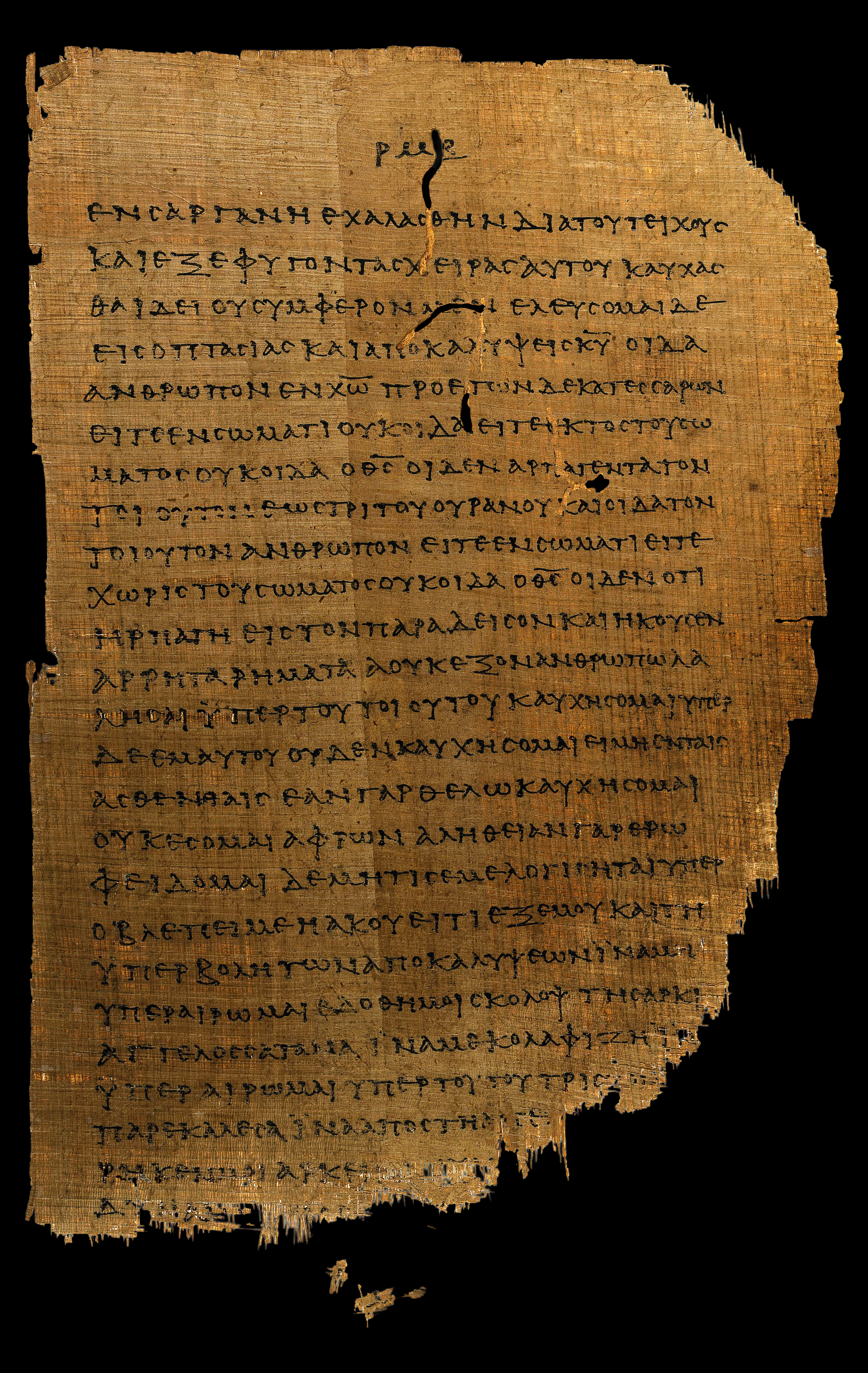
Papyrus 46 fol. 142r is one of the earliest extant copies of this section in 2 Corinthians.

Boasting is necessary, though it is not beneficial; but I will go on to visions and revelations of the Lord. I know a man in Christ, who fourteen years ago—whether in the body I do not know, or out of the body I do not know, God knows—such a man was caught up to the third heaven. And I know how such a man—whether in the body or apart from the body I do not know, God knows— was caught up into Paradise and heard inexpressible words, which a man is not permitted to speak. In behalf of such a man I will boast; but in my own behalf I will not boast, except regarding my weaknesses. For if I do wish to boast I will not be foolish, for I will be speaking the truth; but I refrain from this, so that no one will credit me with more than he sees in me or hears from me.

— 2 Corinthians 12:1-7, NASB

The Epistle to the Galatians chapter 1 also describes Paul's conversion as a divine revelation, with Jesus appearing to him

I want you to know, brothers and sisters, that the gospel I preached is not of human origin. I did not receive it from any man, nor was I taught it; rather, I received it by revelation from Jesus Christ. For you have heard of my previous way of life in Judaism, how intensely I persecuted the church of God and tried to destroy it. [...] But when God, who set me apart from my mother's womb and called me by his grace, was pleased to reveal his Son in me so that I might preach him among the Gentiles, my immediate response was not to consult any human being.

— Galatians 1:11–16, NIV

=== Acts of the Apostles ===
The Acts of the Apostles discusses Paul's conversion experience at three different points in the text, in far more detail than in the accounts in Paul's letters. The Book of Acts says that Paul was on his way from Jerusalem to Syrian Damascus with a mandate issued by the High Priest to seek out and arrest followers of Jesus, with the intention of returning them to Jerusalem as prisoners for questioning and possible execution. The journey is interrupted when Paul sees a blinding light, and communicates directly with a divine voice.

Acts 9 tells the story as a third-person narrative:

As he neared Damascus on his journey, suddenly a light from heaven flashed around him. He fell to the ground and heard a voice say to him, "Saul, Saul, why do you persecute me?"

"Who are you, Lord?" Saul asked.

"I am Jesus, whom you are persecuting," he replied. "Now get up and go into the city, and you will be told what you must do."

The men traveling with Saul stood there speechless; they heard the sound but did not see anyone. Paul got up from the ground, but when he opened his eyes he could see nothing. So they led him by the hand into Damascus. For three days he was blind, and did not eat or drink anything.

— Acts 9:3–9, NIV

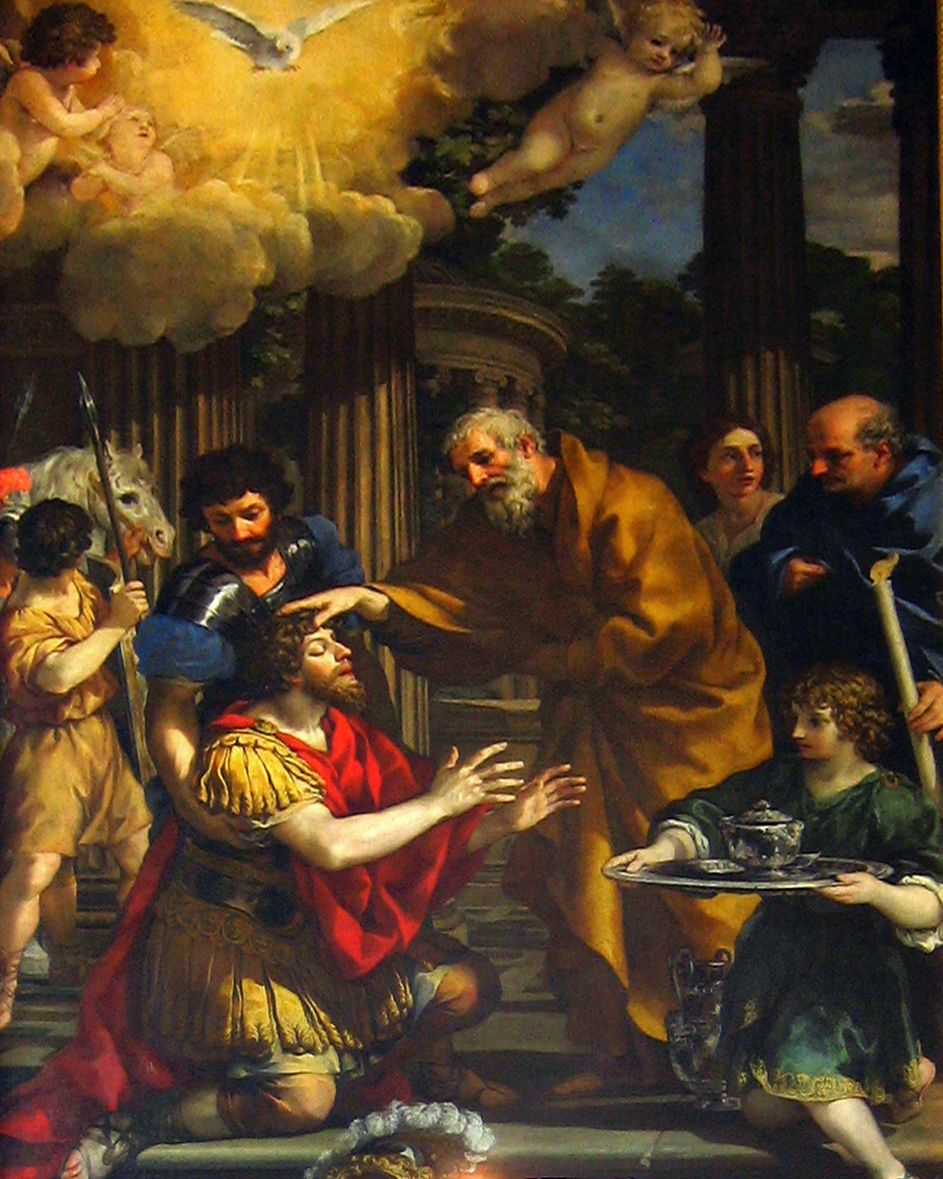
Ananias Restoring the Sight of St. Paul (c. 1631) by Pietro da Cortona

The account continues with a description of Ananias of Damascus receiving a divine revelation instructing him to visit Saul at the house of Judas on the Street Called Straight and there lay hands on him to restore his sight (the house of Judas is traditionally believed to have been near the west end of the street). Ananias is initially reluctant, having heard about Saul's persecution, but obeys the divine command:

Then Ananias went to the house and entered it. Placing his hands on Saul, he said, "Brother Saul, the Lord—Jesus, who appeared to you on the road as you were coming here—has sent me so that you may see again and be filled with the Holy Spirit." Immediately, something like scales fell from Saul's eyes, and he could see again. He got up and was baptized, and after taking some food, he regained his strength.

— Acts 9:13–19, NIV

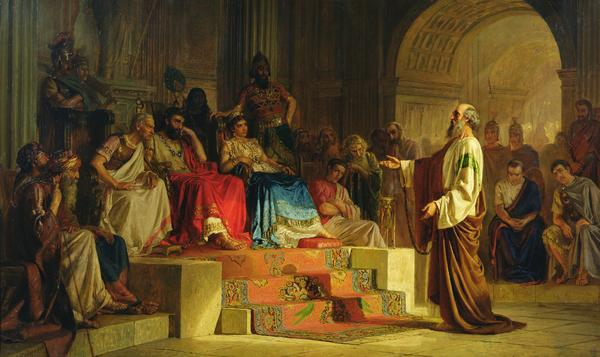
Paul on trial before Agrippa (Acts 26), as pictured by Nikolai Bodarevsky, 1875

Acts' second telling of Paul's conversion occurs in a speech Paul gives when he is arrested in Jerusalem. Paul addresses the crowd and tells them a different description of his conversion. The speech is clearly tailored for its Jewish audience, with stress being placed in Acts 22:12 on Ananias's good reputation among Jews in Damascus, rather than on his Christianity.

Acts' third discussion of Paul's conversion occurs when Paul addresses King Agrippa, defending himself against the accusations of antinomianism that have been made against him. This account is briefer than the others. The speech here is again tailored for its audience, emphasizing what a Roman ruler would understand: the need to obey a heavenly vision, and reassuring Agrippa that Christians were not a secret society.

== Differences between the accounts ==
While Acts 9:7 states that Paul's travelling companions heard a voice and did not see, Acts 22:9 states that they did not hear the voice but saw the light. Traditional readings and modern biblical scholarship both see a discrepancy between these passages, which has been the subject of some debate; Craig Keener notes that ancient historians would not have trifled over differences in minor details, with the point being selective revelation. Some modern conservative evangelical commentators argue that the discrepancy can be explained. Richard Longenecker argues that first century readers might have understood the two passages to mean that everybody heard the sound of the voice, but "only Paul understood the articulated words".

The debate revolves around two Greek words. The noun φωνή (phōnē - a source of English words such as "telephone", "phonic", and "phoneme") translates as "voice, utterance, report, faculty of speech, the call of an animal", but also as "sound" when referring poetically to an inanimate object; however, the normal Greek word for an inarticulate sound is ψόφος (psophos). The verb ἀκούω (akouō - a source of English words such as "acoustics"), which usually means "hear", has the secondary meaning of "understand", which is how most translations render it in 1 Cor. 14:2, for example. However, this meaning is so rare that the main English-to-Greek dictionaries do not list ἀκούω among the possible translations of "understand". Resolving the discrepancy involves translating φωνή and ἀκούω in Acts 9:7 as "sound" and "hear" respectively, but translating the same words in Acts 22:9 as "voice" and "understand".

The New Revised Standard Version Updated Edition (NRSVue) renders the two texts as follows:

The men who were traveling with him stood speechless because they heard the voice but saw no one. (Acts 9:7)
Now those who were with me saw the light but did not hear the voice of the one who was speaking to me. (Acts 22:9)

Most traditional translations including the English King James Version (KJV), the Latin Vulgate, and Luther's German translation are similar, translating the key words identically in each of the parallel texts, and thus not disguising the contradiction. However, since the 1970s, some versions have attempted a harmonizing translation, including the New International Version (NIV), which reads:

The men traveling with Saul stood there speechless; they heard the sound but did not see anyone. (Acts 9:7)
My companions saw the light, but they did not understand the voice of him who was speaking to me. (Acts 22:9)

Likewise the NET Bible and others. By translating φωνή and ἀκούω differently in each case, the contradiction is disguised.

Those who support harmonizing readings sometimes point out that in Acts 9:7, ἀκούω appears in a participle construction with a genitive (ἀκούοντες μὲν τῆς φωνῆς), and in Acts 22:9 as a finite verb with an accusative object (φωνὴν οὐκ ἤκουσαν). Nigel Turner suggests the use of the accusative indicates hearing with understanding. More commonly, proponents of this view have asserted that the genitive is used when a person is heard, the accusative for a thing, which goes in the same direction but yields a far weaker argument. New Testament scholars Daniel B. Wallace and F.F. Bruce find this argument based on case inconclusive and caution against using it. Wallace gathers all examples of ἀκούω with each construction in the New Testament and finds that there are more exceptions to the supposed rule than examples of it. He concludes: "regardless of how one works through the accounts of Paul's conversion, an appeal to different cases probably ought not to form any part of the solution."

== Theological implications ==
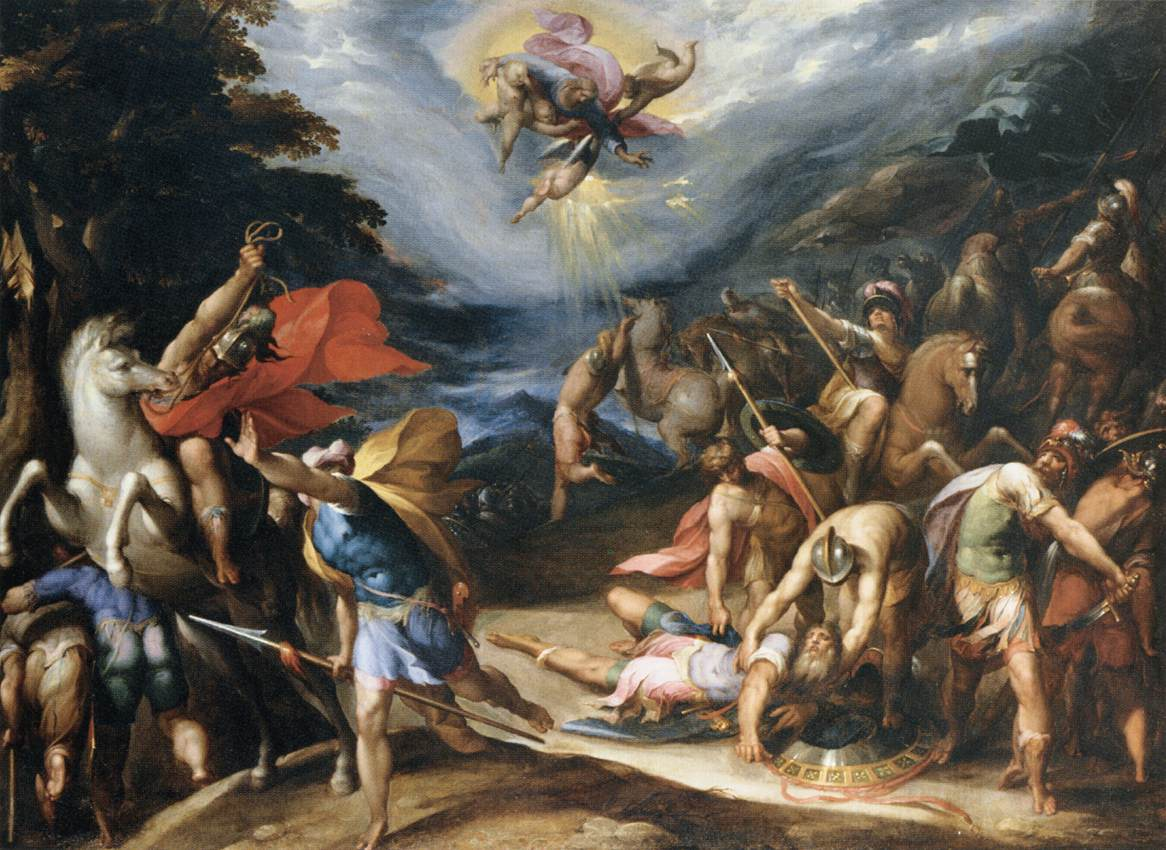
Hans Speckaert

Whereas Protestants saw the conversion as a demonstration of sola fide, Counter-Reformation Catholics saw it as a demonstration of, or at least a metaphor for, the power of preaching, which received a strong new emphasis after the Council of Trent.

The conversion of Paul, in spite of his attempts to completely eradicate Christianity, is seen as evidence of the power of Divine Grace, with "no fall so deep that grace cannot descend to it" and "no height so lofty that grace cannot lift the sinner to it." It also demonstrates "God's power to use everything, even the hostile persecutor, to achieve the divine purpose."

There is no evidence to suggest that Paul arrived on the road to Damascus already with a single, solid, coherent scheme that could form the framework of his mature theology. Instead, the conversion, and the associated understanding of the significance of the resurrection of the crucified Jesus, caused him to rethink from the ground up everything he had ever believed in, from his own identity to his understanding of Second Temple Judaism and who God really was.

The transforming effect of Paul's conversion influenced the clear antithesis he saw "between righteousness based on the law," which he had sought in his former life; and "righteousness based on the death of Christ," which he describes, for example, in the Epistle to the Galatians.

Based on Paul's testimony in Galatians 1 and the accounts in Acts (Acts 9, 22, 26), where it is specifically mentioned that Paul was tasked to be a witness to the Gentiles, it could be interpreted that what happened on the road to Damascus was not just a conversion from first-century Judaism to a faith centred on Jesus Christ, but also a commissioning of Paul as an Apostle to the Gentiles—although in Paul's mind they both amounted to the same thing.

== Alternative explanations ==
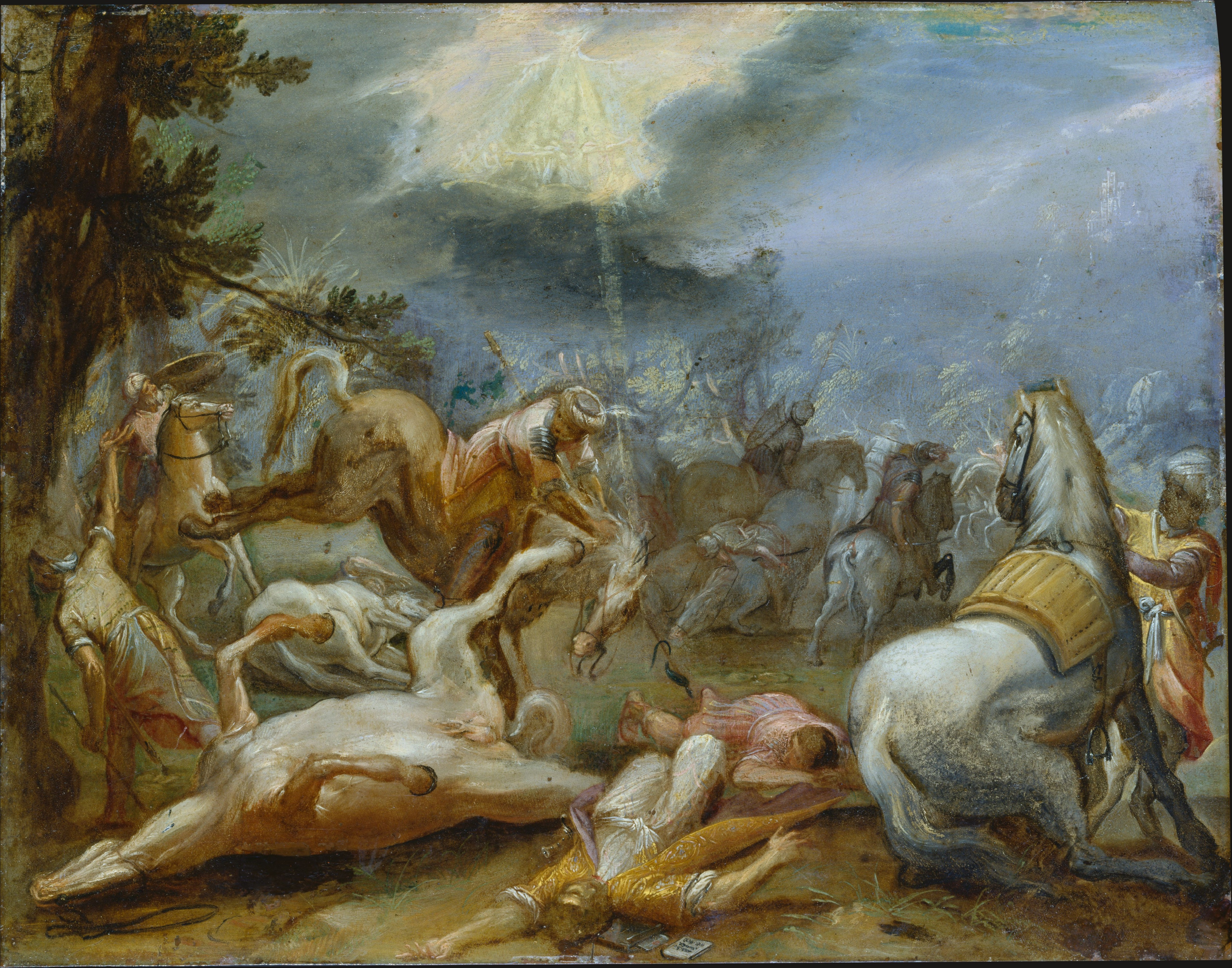
Adam Elsheimer

The Acts of the Apostles says that Paul's conversion experience was an encounter with the resurrected Christ. Alternative explanations have been proposed, including sun stroke and seizure. In 1987, D. Landsborough published an article in the Journal of Neurology, Neurosurgery, and Psychiatry, in which he stated that Paul's conversion experience, with the bright light, loss of normal bodily posture, a message of strong religious content, and his subsequent blindness, suggested "an attack of temporal lobe epilepsy, perhaps ending in a convulsion ... The blindness which followed may have been post-ictal."

This conclusion was challenged in the same journal by James R. Brorson and Kathleen Brewer, who stated that this hypothesis failed to explain why Paul's companions heard a voice (Acts 9:7), saw a light, or fell to the ground. Additionally, Paul's blindness remitted in sudden fashion, rather than the gradual resolution typical of post-ictal states, and no mention is made of epileptic convulsions; indeed such convulsions may, in Paul's time, have been interpreted as a sign of demonic influence, unlikely in someone accepted as a religious leader.

A 2012 paper in the Journal of Neuropsychiatry and Clinical Neurosciences suggested that Paul's conversion experience might be understood as involving psychogenic events. This occurring in the overall context of Paul's other auditory and visual experiences that the authors propose may have been caused by mood disorder associated psychotic spectrum symptoms.

== Catholic commentary ==
Justus Knecht comments on the power of divine grace in Paul's conversion:

Our Blessed Lord prevented Saul with His grace, enlightened his understanding, moved his heart, and prepared his will to do all that was commanded him. In the very midst of his sinful career grace called to Saul to stop, and changed his heart so completely that the bitter enemy of Jesus Christ was transformed into an apostle, all aglow with love; and the persecutor of the Christian faith became its indefatigable defender and advocate. Thus St. Paul was able to say of himself: "By the grace of God I am what I am; and His grace in me hath not been void, but I have laboured more abundantly than they all: yet not I, but the grace of God with me" (1 Cor. 15:10)."

Thomas Aquinas sees Paul's conversion as an example of a sudden grace of God, writing in his Summa Theologiae:

Since a man cannot prepare himself for grace unless God prevent and move him to good, it is of no account whether anyone arrive at perfect preparation instantaneously, or step by step. For it is written (Ecclus. 11:23): "It is easy in the eyes of God on a sudden to make the poor man rich." Now it sometimes happens that God moves a man to good, but not perfect good, and this preparation precedes grace. But He sometimes moves him suddenly and perfectly to good, and man receives grace suddenly, according to Jn. 6:45: "Every one that hath heard of the Father, and hath learned, cometh to Me." And thus it happened to Paul, since, suddenly when he was in the midst of sin, his heart was perfectly moved by God to hear, to learn, to come; and hence he received grace suddenly.

Pope Francis on 25 January 2024, dated a pastoral letter on the liturgical feast day of the conversion of St Paul, ahead of world mission sunday on 20 October 2024, ahead of the jubilee year of 2025 calling the faithful to be prayerful pilgrims of hope.

== Art ==
The subject was not common in medieval art, only usually being painted as one of a number of predella scenes of his life below an altarpiece dedicated to the saint. From the Renaissance it gradually became popular as a subject for larger paintings. Apart from the religious significance, the subject allowed the artist to include landscape elements, a crowd of figures and horses. The drama of the event especially appealed to Baroque painters. It was sometimes paired with the handing of the Keys to Saint Peter, although in the Vatican Cappella Paolina Michelangelo paired it with Peter's Crucifixion in the 1540s, perhaps in a change to the original plan.

The conversion of Paul has been depicted by many artists, including Albrecht Dürer, Francisco Camilo, Giovanni Bellini, Fra Angelico, Fra Bartolomeo, Pieter Bruegel the Elder, William Blake, Luca Giordano, Sante Peranda, and Juan Antonio de Frías y Escalante. Michelangelo's fresco The Conversion of Saul is in the Cappella Paolina of the Vatican Palace.

Caravaggio painted two works depicting the event: The Conversion of Saint Paul and Conversion on the Way to Damascus. Peter Paul Rubens also produced several works on the theme.

A large number of the many depictions show Paul, and often several of his companions, travelling the Damascus Road on horseback, Paul most often on a white horse. This is not mentioned in the biblical accounts (which do not say how he travelled), and certainly makes for a more dramatic composition. The horses are usually shown as disturbed by the sudden appearance of the vision, and have often fallen to the ground themselves. It may also reflect how people of the various periods expected a person of Paul's importance to travel a distance of 135 miles (or 218 km). Perhaps first appearing in the 14th century, Paul's horse appears in the most important depictions from the 15th century onwards.

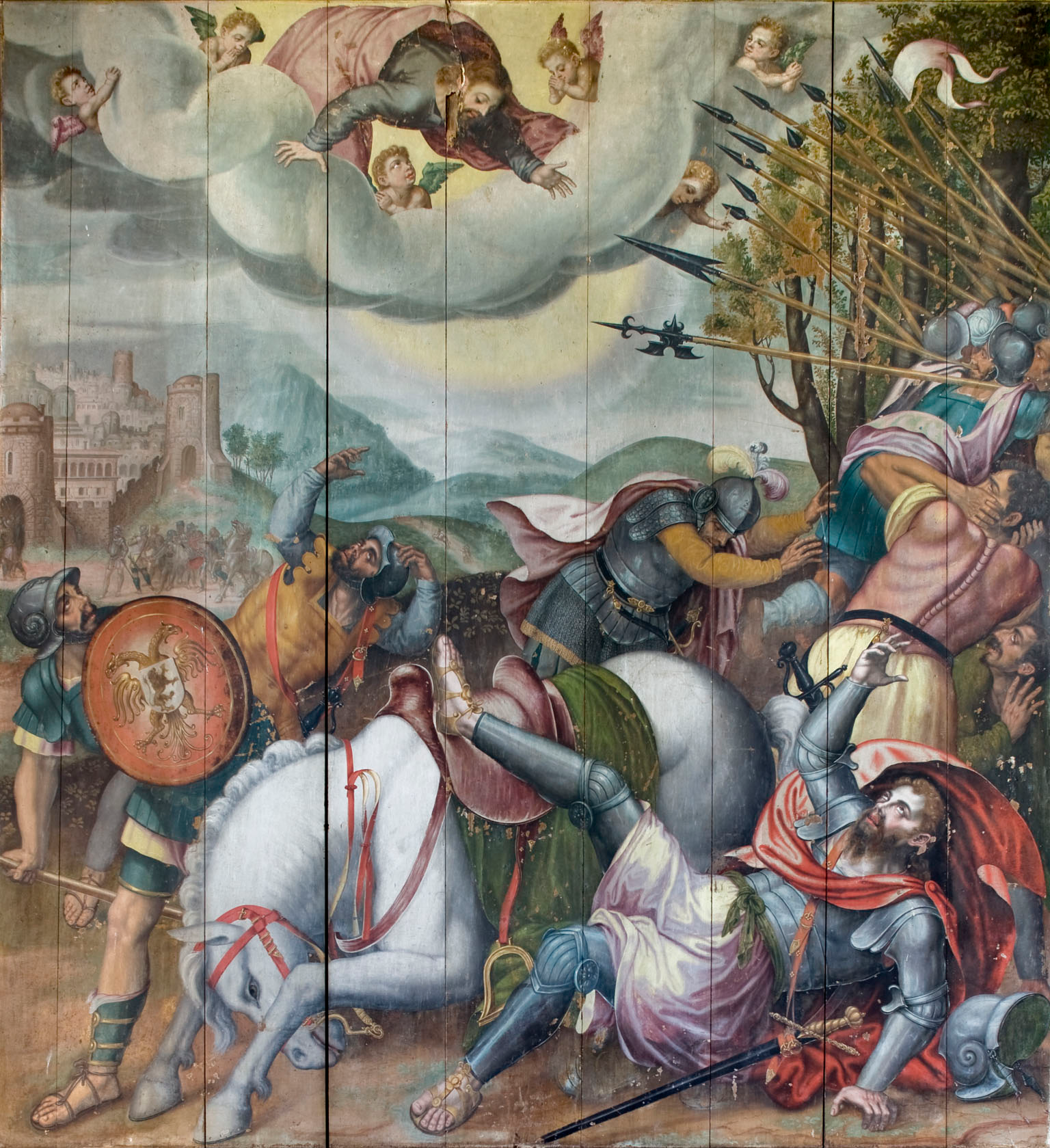
Conversão de São Paulo (c. 1562–1595) - Francisco João (Igreja Matriz de São Paulo em Pavia, Mora)

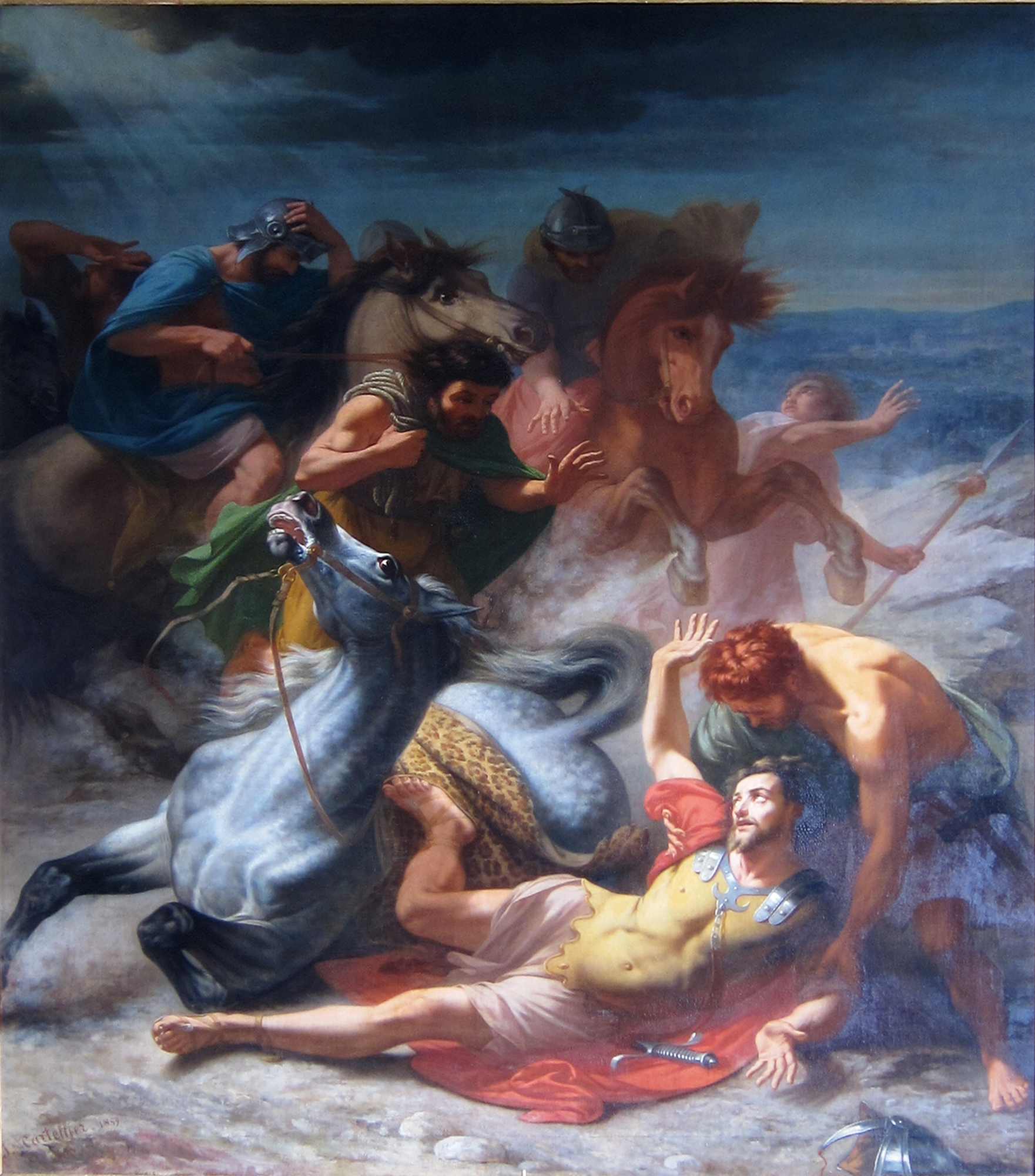
Lille st pierre st paul cartellier

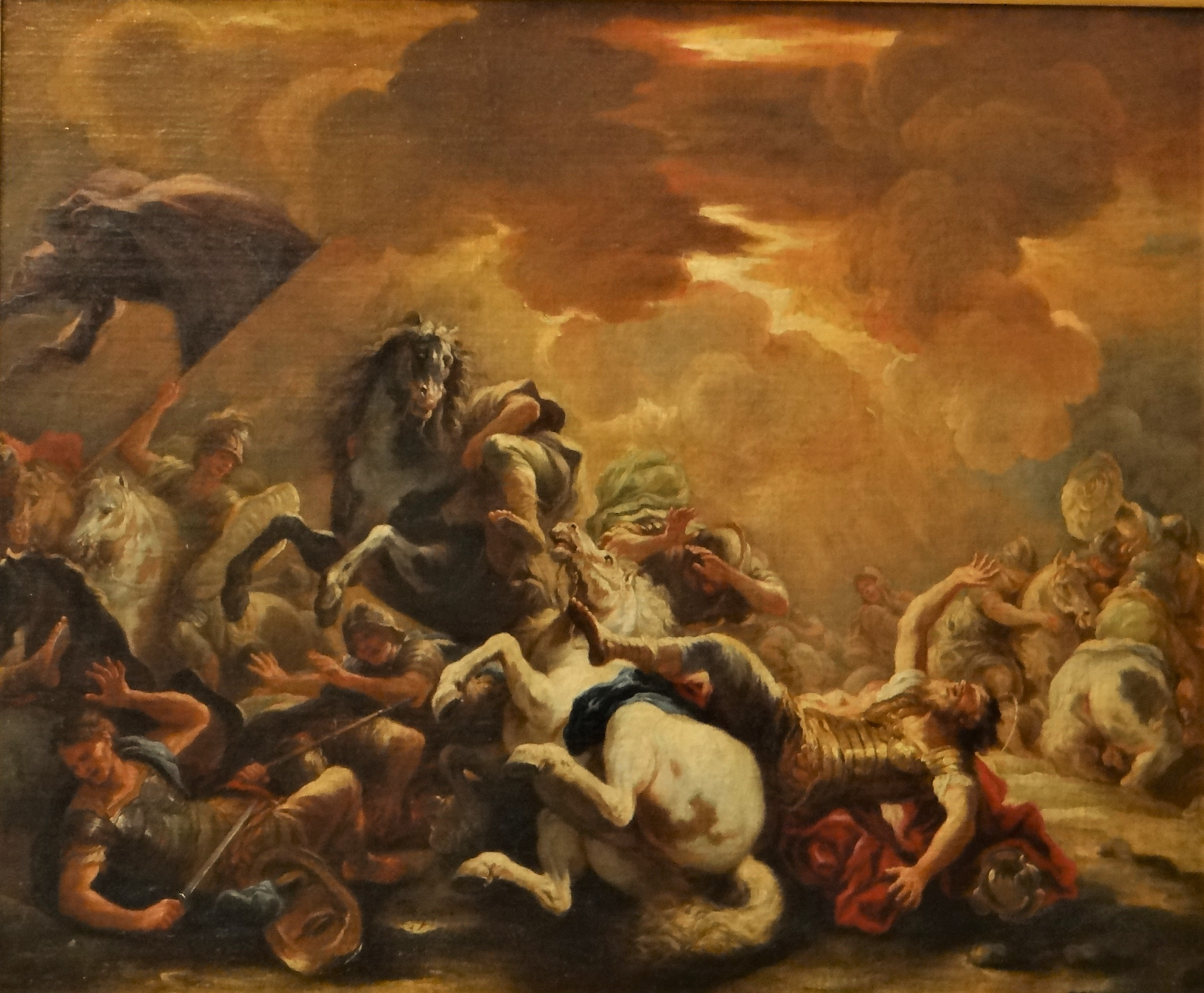
Musée d'art et d'archéologie du Périgord - Luca Giordano - Saint Paul sur le chemin de Damas

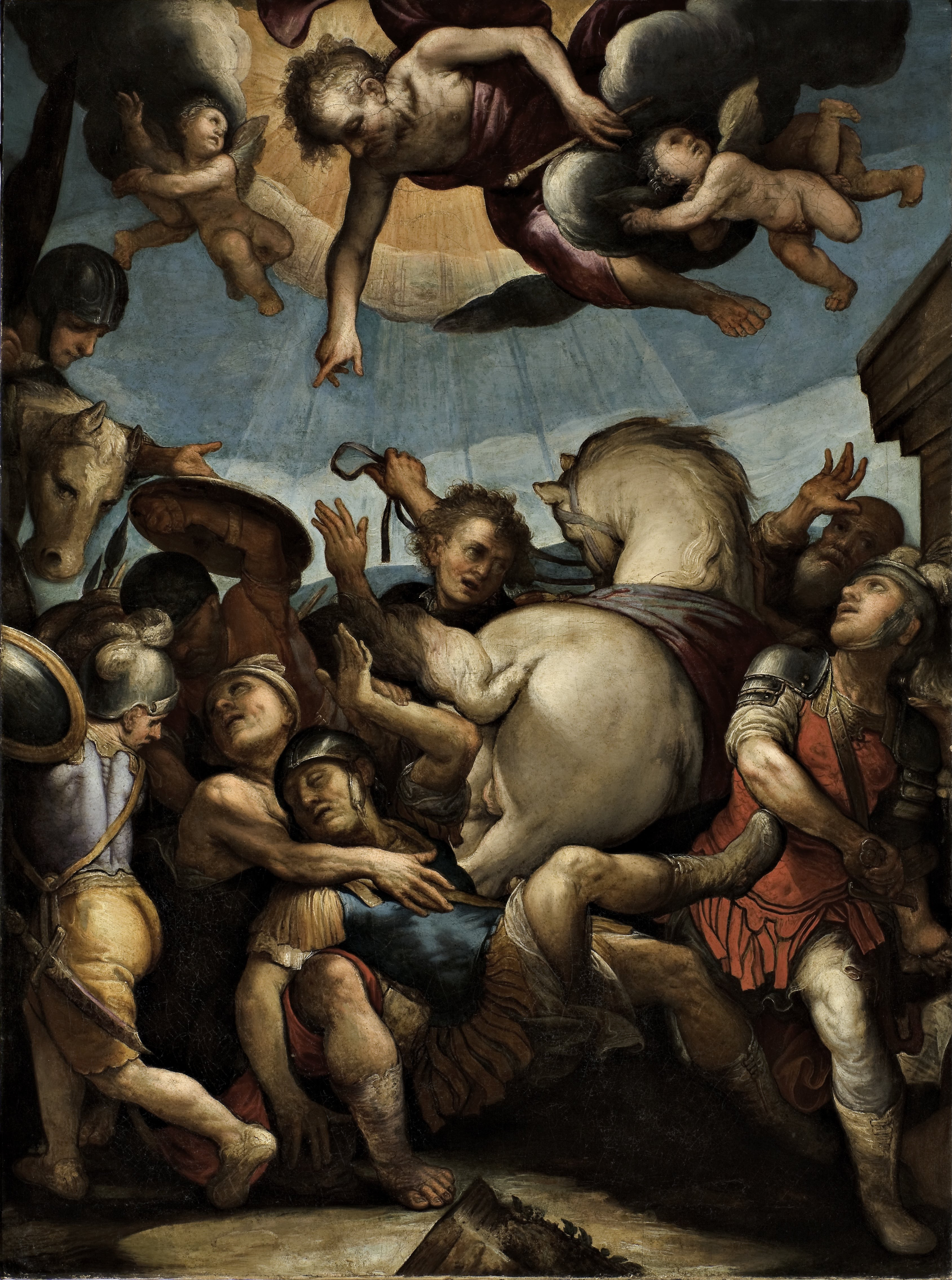
Ferraù Fenzoni - The conversion of St Paul

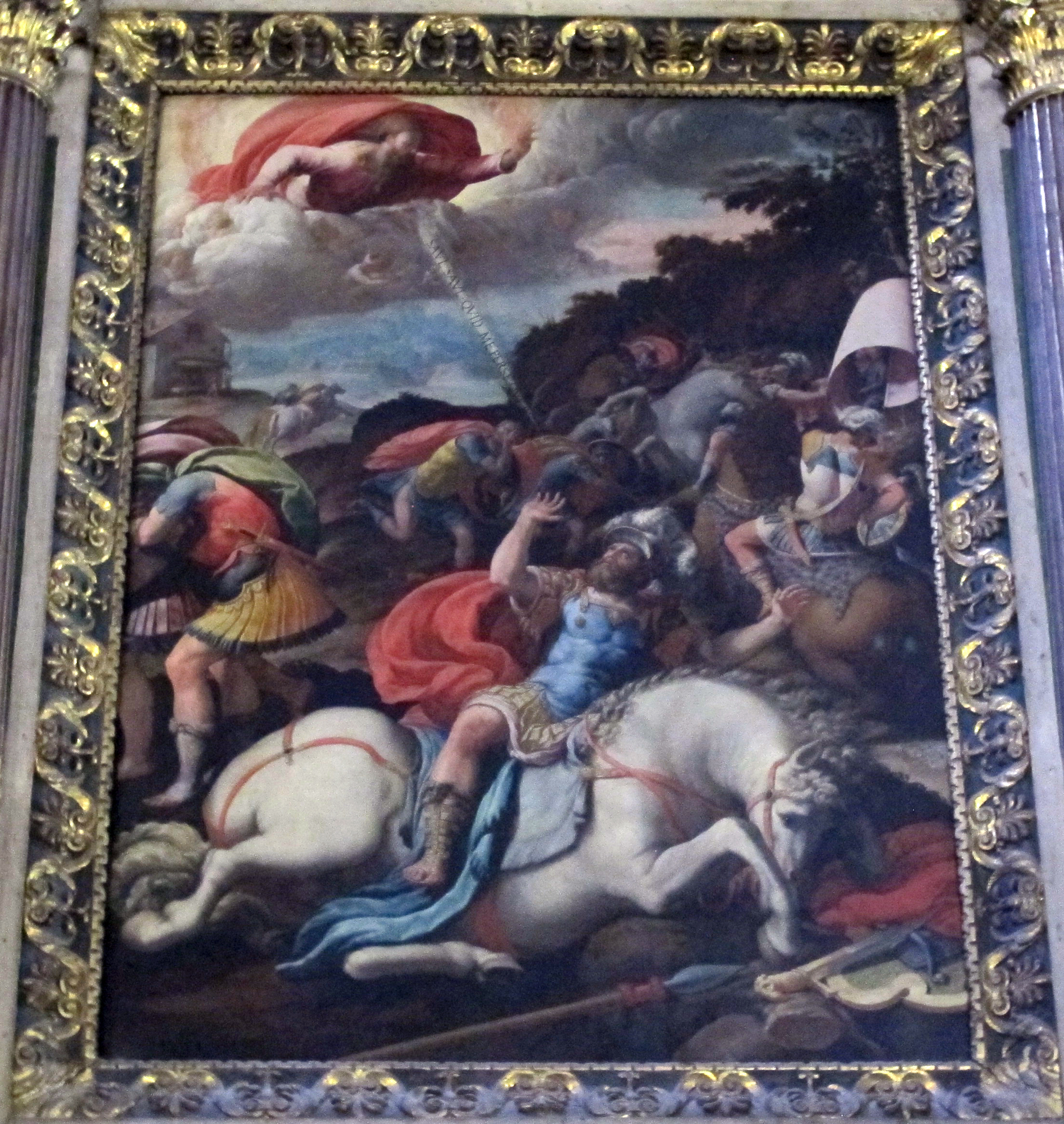
Francesco ruviale, conversione di saulo 04

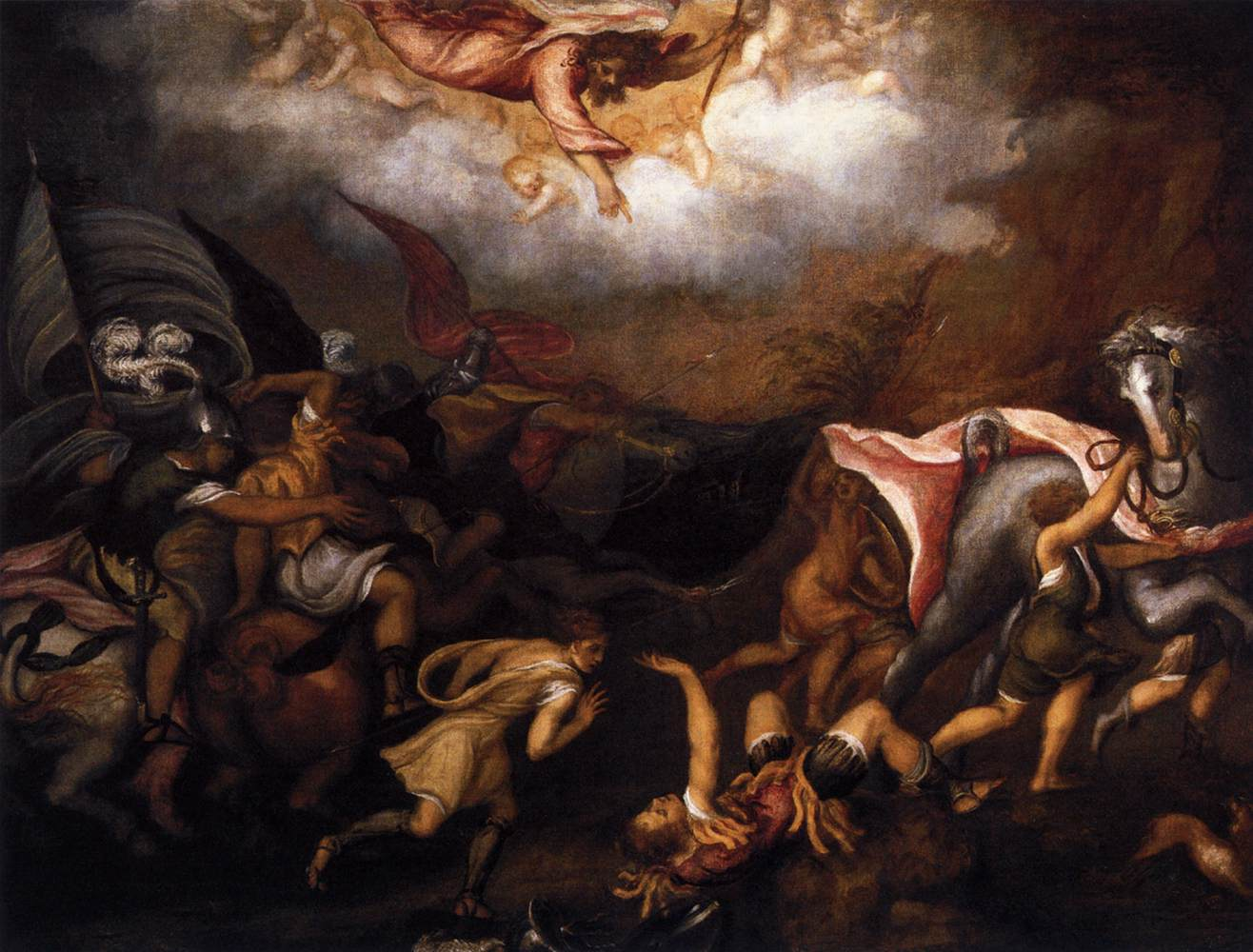
Schiavone 2

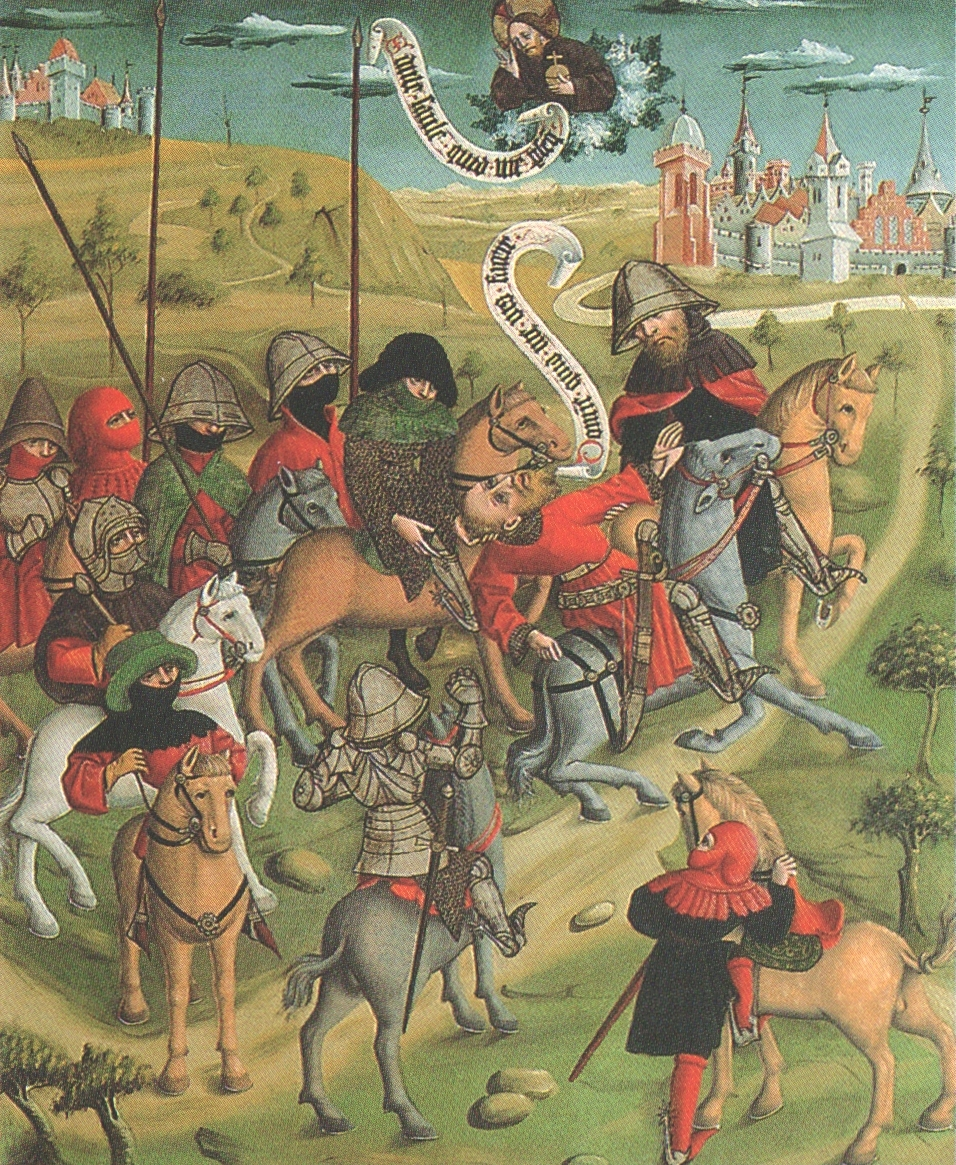
The Trinity Altar- Conversion of St. Paul

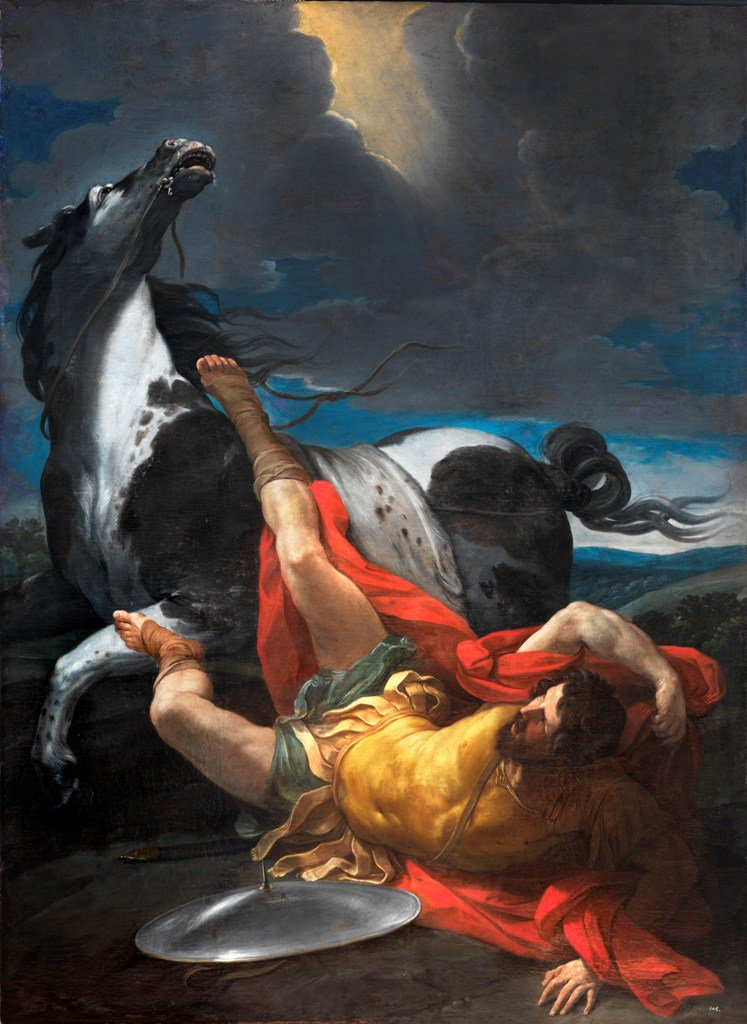
Conversión de Saulo (Reni)

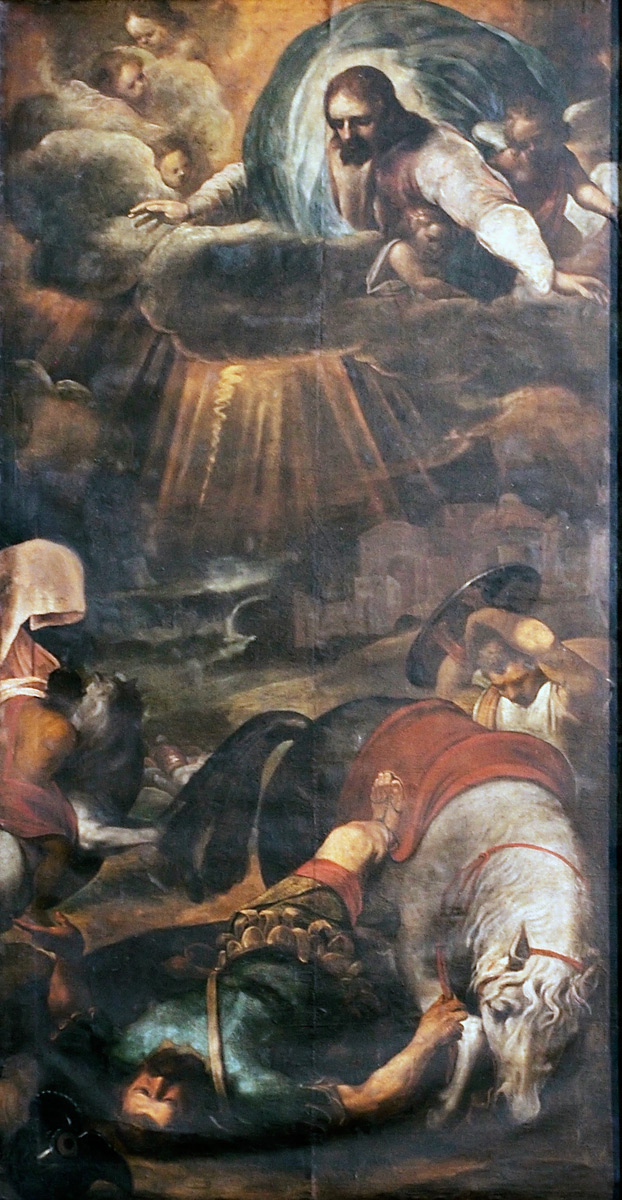
Cárdenas - Conversión de San Pablo 20140710

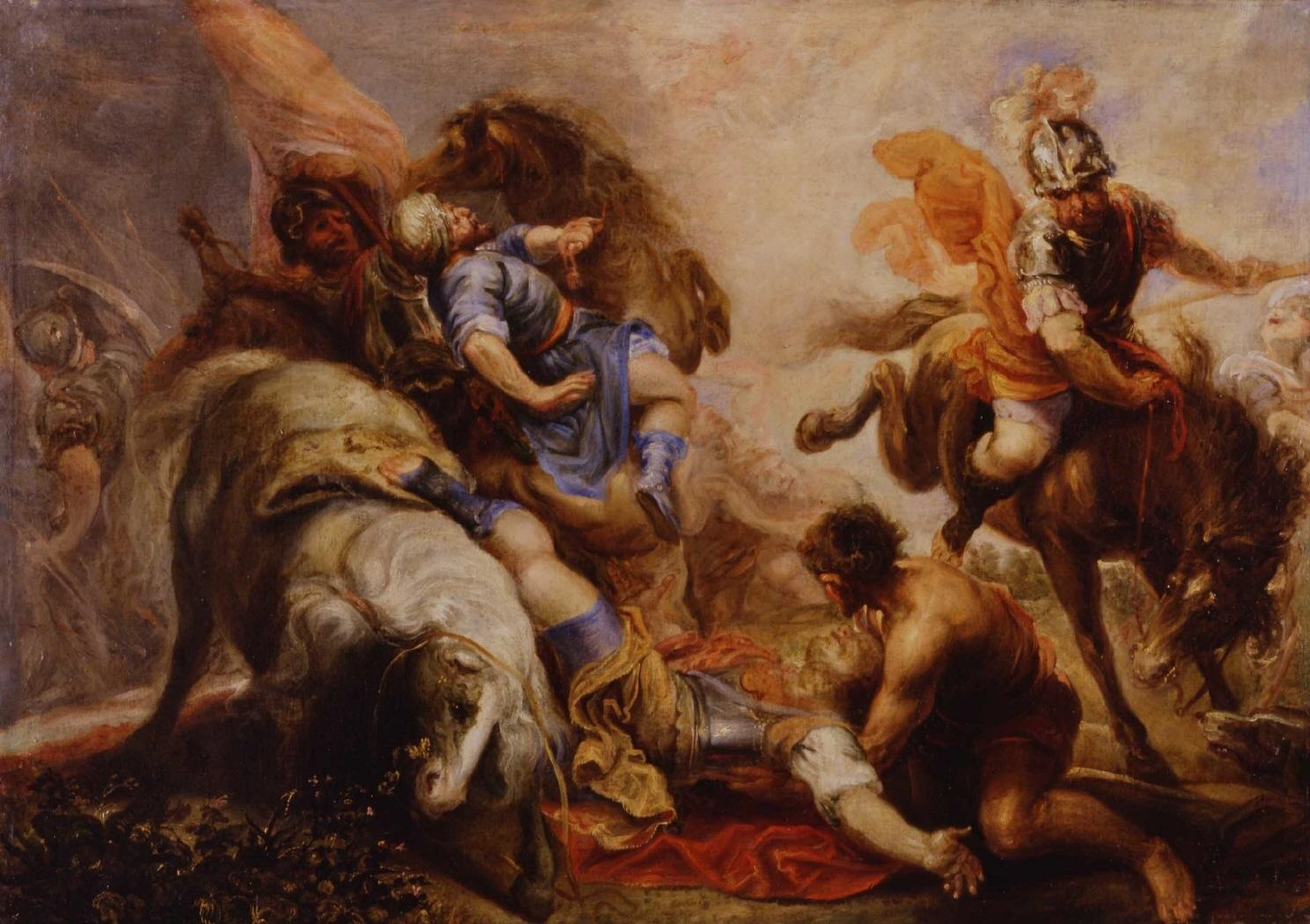
Escalante 001

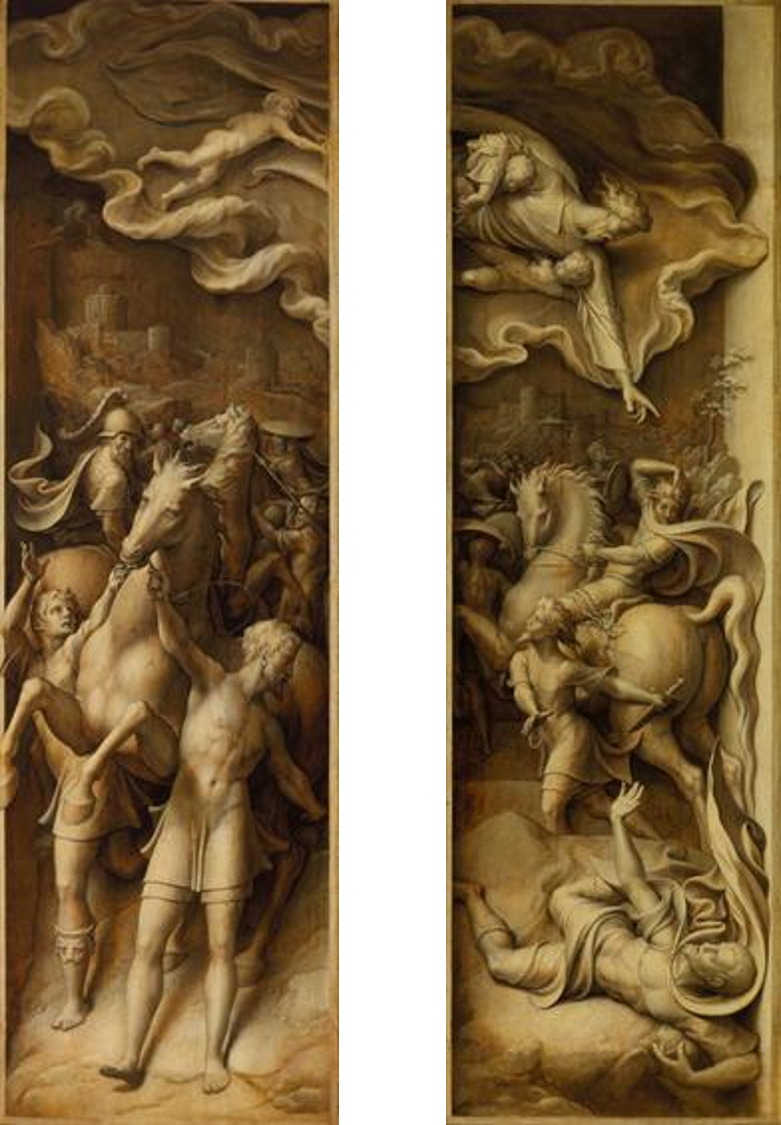
Tríptico da Descida da Cruz (c. 1540–1545) - Pieter Coecke van Aelst (closed)

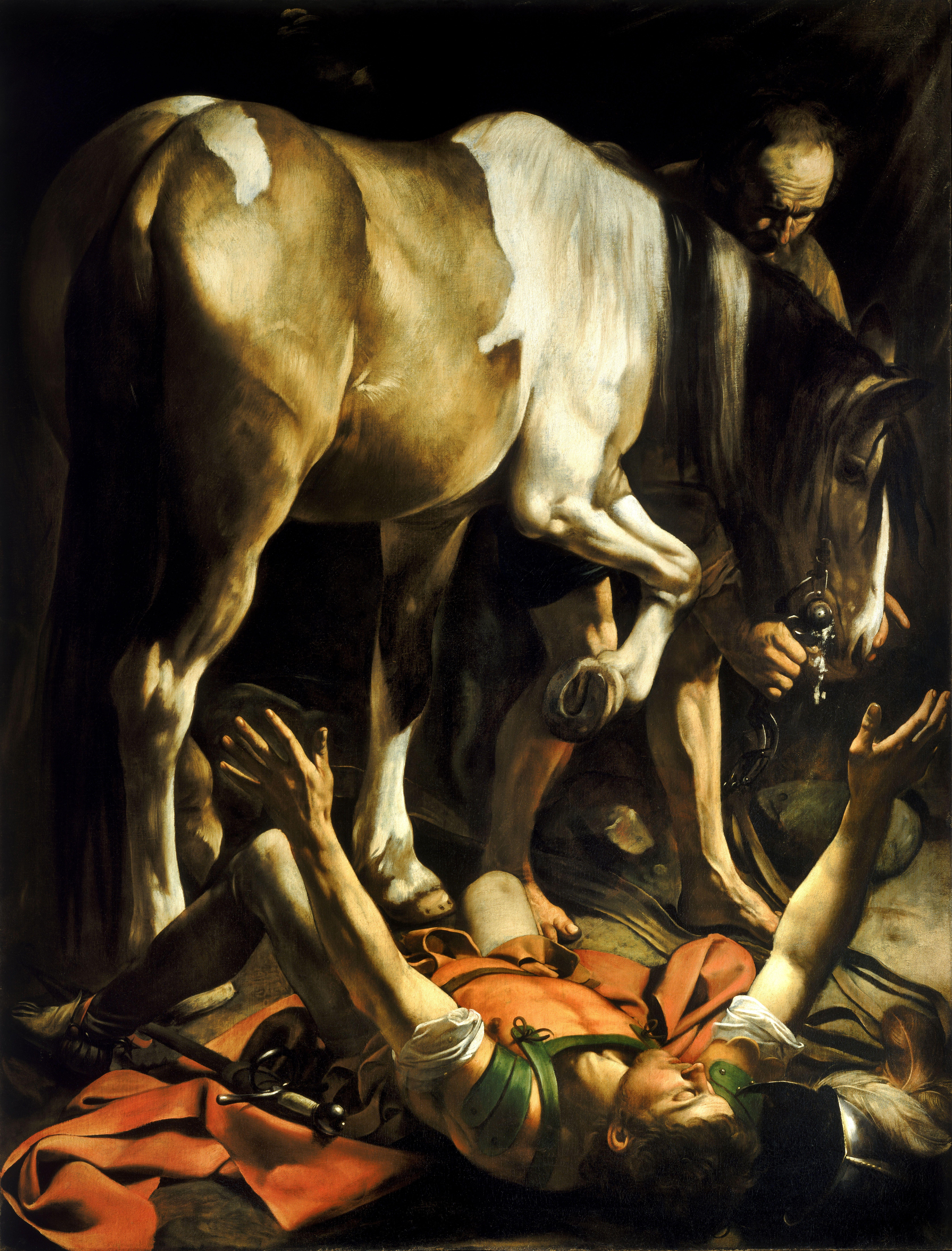
Conversion on the Way to Damascus, Caravaggio (c. 1600–01)

=== Literature ===
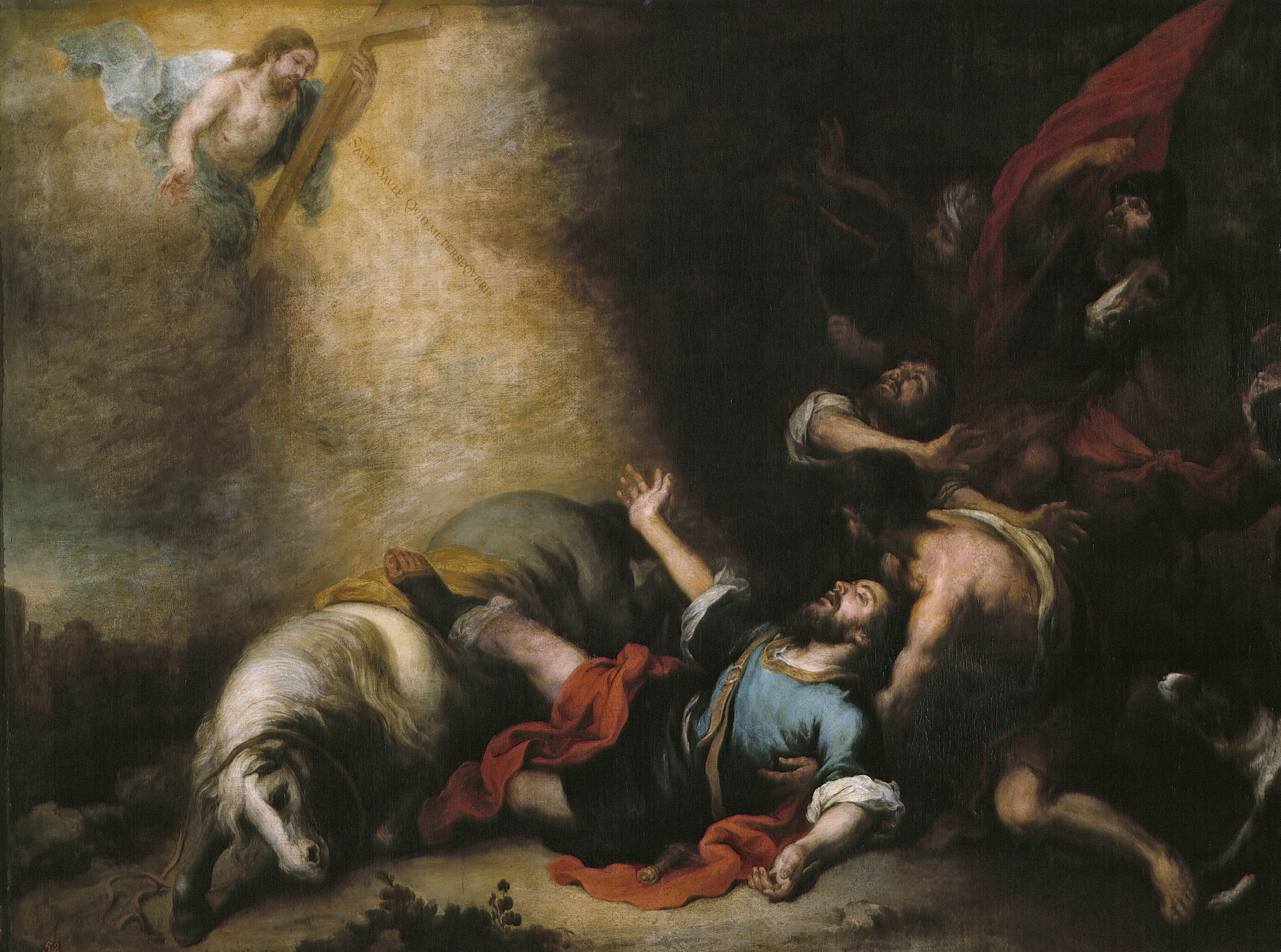
Murillo

Chapter seventeen of Ralph Ellison's 1952 novel Invisible Man includes a literary device related to the Saul to Paul conversion: "'You start Saul, and end up Paul,' my grandfather had often said. 'When you're a youngun, you Saul, but let life whup your head a bit and you starts to trying to be Paul – though you still Sauls around on the side.'"

Paul's conversion is the subject of the medieval play The Digby Conversion of Saint Paul.

=== Music ===
The conversion of Paul is the main term of argument of Felix Mendelssohn Bartholdy's oratorio Paulus (St. Paul), MWV A 14 / Op. 36] (1833–36). It is also subject of the choral motet Saule, Saule, quid me persequeris by Giaches de Wert (1535–1596). It is also the focus of an eight part mixed choir a cappella piece (The Conversion of Saul) composed by Z. Randall Stroope.

=== Popular usage ===
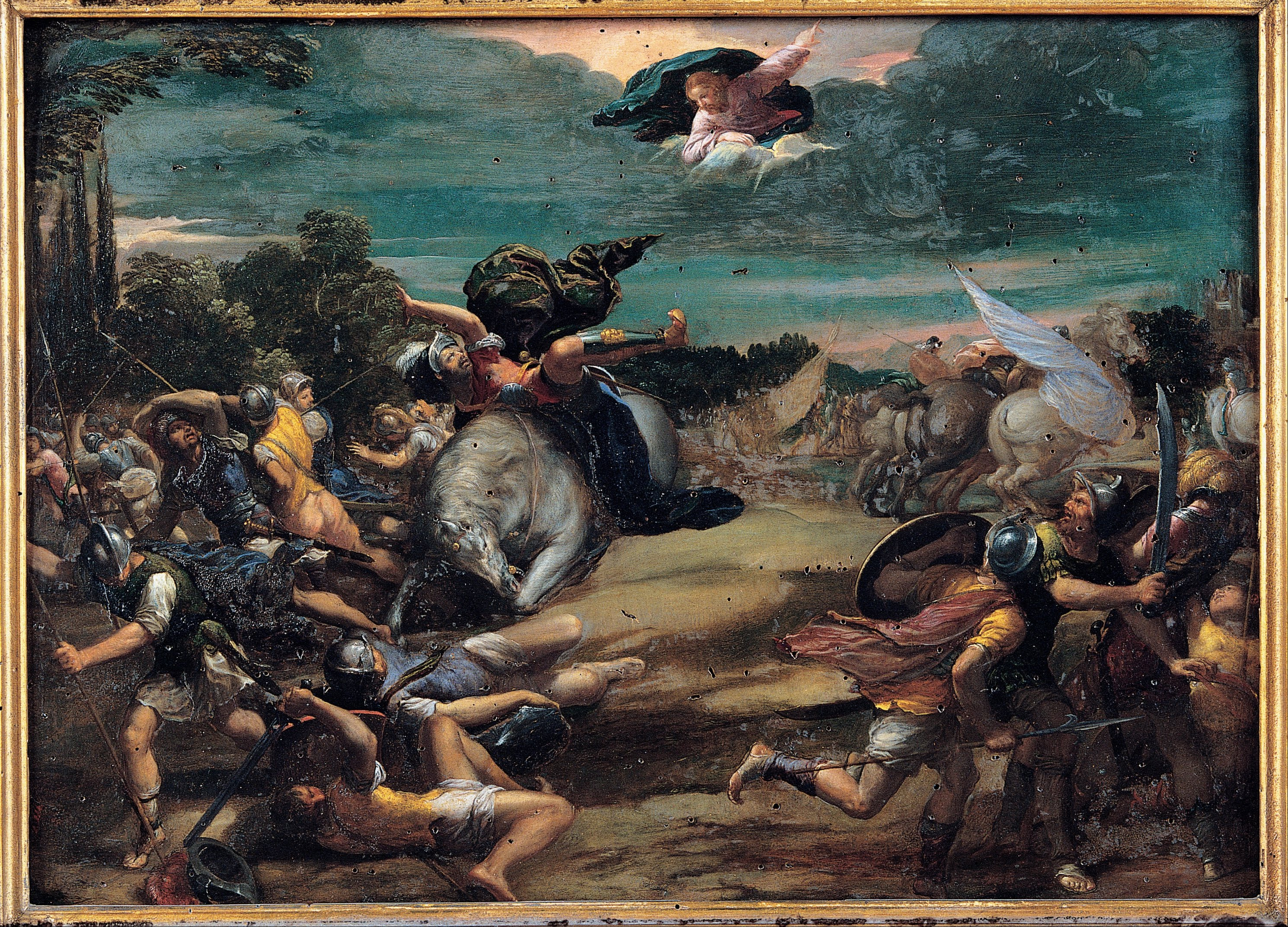
Scarsellino

From the conversion of Paul comes the metaphorical reference to the "Road to Damascus", meaning a sudden or radical conversion of thought or a change of heart or mind, even in matters outside of a Christian context. For example, Australian politician Tony Abbott was described as having been "on his own road to Damascus" after pledging increased mental health funding, and a New Zealand drug dealer turned police officer was likewise described as taking "the first step on the road to Damascus." In science fiction, the book The Road to Damascus is based on a sudden political conversion of a self-aware tank, Unit SOL-0045, "Sonny," a Mark XX Bolo, on the battlefield.

In "-30-", the finale episode of The Wire, Norman Wilson tells attorney Rupert Bond he believes police commissioner Bill Rawls is "about to have one of those Road to Damascus moments".

In Episode 3, Season 4 of Downton Abbey, Lady Grantham referred to Lord Grantham's change of heart towards his daughter Edith's boyfriend as a "Damascene Conversion".

In the mystery film Wake Up Dead Man, former boxer turned Catholic priest Judd Duplenticy evokes the story of Paul's conversion on the road to Damascus to describe the incident that led him to the Church. He likens Paul's persecution of Christians to his accidental killing of another boxer whom he had a personal grudge against in the ring; unforgivable acts of hatred which God in his mercy nevertheless forgives and then invites the guilty to find salvation.

== Feast day ==
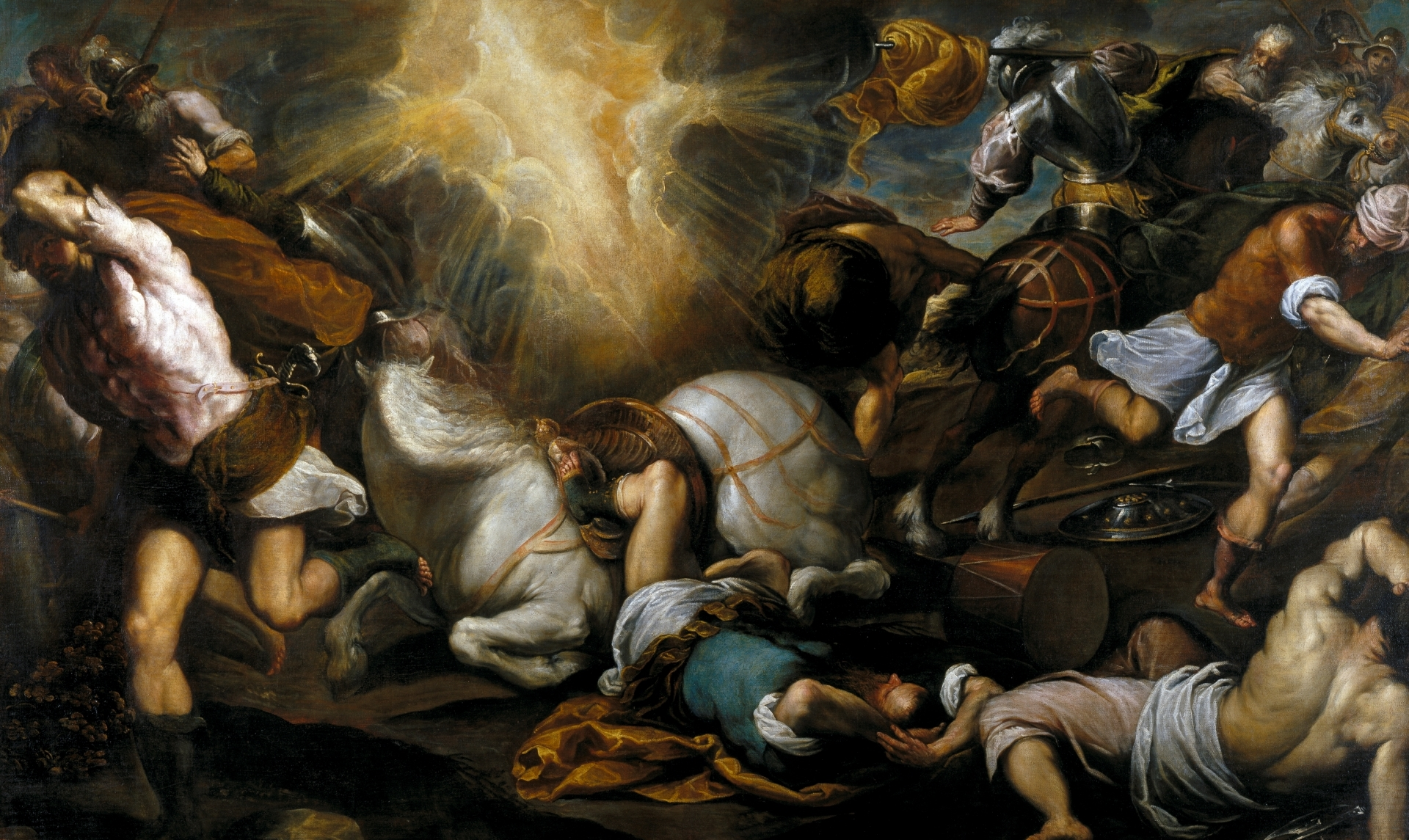
Palma Giovane, Museo del Prado

The Feast of the Conversion of Saint Paul the Apostle commemorates this event, and is celebrated in the liturgical year on 25 January. It has been celebrated since the 8th century. This feast is celebrated in the Roman Catholic, Anglican and Lutheran churches, and concludes the Week of Prayer for Christian Unity, a yearly international Christian ecumenical event that began in 1908, which is an octave or eight-day observance beginning 18 January (observed in Anglican and Lutheran tradition as the Confession of Peter, and in the pre-Vatican II Catholic calendar as the Feast of the Chair of Saint Peter at Rome). In rural England, the day once functioned like Groundhog Day does in the modern United States. Supposed prophecies ranged from fine days predicting good harvests, to clouds and mists signifying pestilence and war in the coming months.

The collect of the day in the Roman Missal is:

O God, who taught the whole world
through the preaching of the blessed Apostle Paul,
draw us, we pray, nearer to you
through the example of him whose conversion we celebrate today,
and so make us witnesses to your truth in the world.

== See also ==
On Paul's conversion

- Acts 9, Acts 22, Acts 26
- Split of early Christianity and Judaism
- Tabor Light

On the Feast day

- Calendar of saints
- General Roman Calendar
- General Roman Calendar of 1954
