= Piero de Ponte =

Grand Master of the Knights Hospitaller

Piero del Ponte

Grand Master of the Order of Saint John
- In office 26 August 1534 – 17 November 1535
- Monarch: King Charles II
- Preceded by: Philippe Villiers de L'Isle-Adam
- Succeeded by: Didier de Saint-Jaille

Personal details
- Born: 26 August 1462[?] Asti, Holy Roman Empire (modern Italy)
- Died: 17 November 1535 (aged 73) Hospitaller Malta
- Resting place: Chapel of St Anne, Fort St Angelo, Birgu, later reburied at St John's Co-Cathedral, Valletta

Military service
- Allegiance: (Sovereign Military Order of Malta) Order of Saint John
- Battles/wars: Siege of Rhodes; Conquest of Tunis

Fra' Piero del Ponte (26 August 1462 – 17 November 1535) was the 45th Grand Master of the Order of Saint John between 1534 and 1535.

== Biography ==
He hailed from Asti, in northern Italy and was a descendant of the ancient family of Casal-Gros and Lombriax. He became a Knights Hospitaller and was the Order's governor of the island of Lango when Rhodes fell to the Ottomans on New Year's Day 1523, and was still there in 1534 when he received the news of his election to the office of Grand Master of the Order, to succeed Philippe Villiers de L'Isle-Adam at Malta. After he was elected he spent two months in Calabria, and arrived in Malta on 10 November 1534.

The first coins of the Order to be minted in Malta were stuck during del Ponte's reign. In June 1535 the Grandmaster sent the Order's navy to fight in the victorious conquest of Tunis.

Del Ponte died on 18 November 1535, 15 months after his election. He was buried in the Chapel of St Anne in Fort St. Angelo, Birgu, Malta. Eventually his remains were interred in the crypt of St. John's Co-Cathedral in Valletta.

Preceded by Philippe Villiers de L'Isle-Adam	Grand Master of the Knights Hospitaller; 1534–1535	Succeeded by Didier de Saint-Jaille
