= Philippe Villiers de L'Isle-Adam =

Grand Master of the Knights Hospitaller (1464–1534)

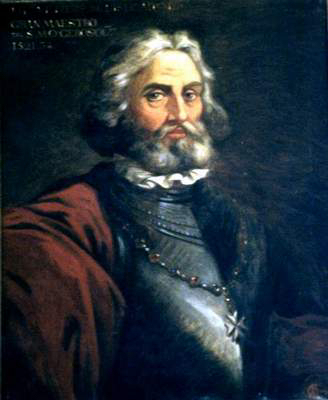

Grand Master of the Order of Saint John
- In office 1521 – 21 August 1534
- Monarch: King Charles II
- Preceded by: Fabrizio del Carretto
- Succeeded by: Piero de Ponte

Personal details
- Born: 1464 Beauvais, France
- Died: 21 August 1534 (aged 69–70) Rabat, Hospitaller Malta
- Resting place: Chapel of St Anne, Fort St Angelo, Birgu, later reburied at St John's Co-Cathedral, Valletta

Military service
- Allegiance: (Sovereign Military Order of Malta) Order of Saint John
- Battles/wars: Siege of Rhodes

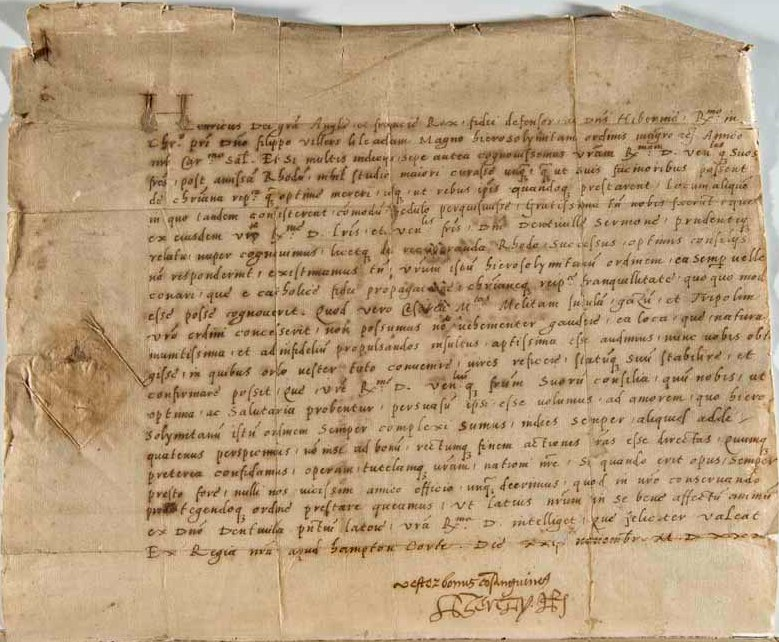
Letter from King Henry VIII to Grand Master l'Isle Adam, 1530

Fra' Philippe de Villiers de L'Isle-Adam (1464 – 21 August 1534) was a prominent member of the Knights Hospitaller at Rhodes and later Malta. Having risen to the position of Prior of the Langue of Auvergne, he was elected 44th Grand Master of the Order in 1521.

== Biography ==
He commanded the Order during Sultan Suleiman's long and bloody Siege of Rhodes in 1522, when 600 knights and 4500 soldiers resisted an invading force of about 100,000 men for six months, but eventually negotiated the capitulation and the departure of the knights on New Year's Day 1523 to Crete.

He then led the Order during several years without a permanent domicile—first Kandi on Crete, then successively Messina, Viterbo and finally Nice (1527–1529). In 1530 de L'Isle-Adam obtained the islands of Malta and Gozo and the North African port city of Tripoli as fief for the Order from Emperor Charles V and established the Order, henceforth known as the Maltese Knights, in their new base. The Order arrived on the island on 26 October 1530 on their flagship, the Santa Anna.

L'Isle-Adam took formal possession of the islands on 13 November, when the silver key of the capital Mdina was given to the Grand Master. Despite this, the Order settled in the coastal town of Birgu and made it their capital city. They settled in Fort Saint Angelo, which served as both a fortification and as a palace. The city was fortified and eventually Auberges for each of the Langues were built. Despite this, the Grand Master and the Order still hoped that one day they would recapture Rhodes (in fact the Order decided to make Malta their permanent home only after the Great Siege 35 years later).

L'Isle-Adam died at the Our Lady of Jesus convent (ta' Ġieżu) in Rabat, Malta on 21 August 1534. He was buried in the Chapel of St Anne within Fort Saint Angelo, but was reburied in the crypt of Saint John's Co-Cathedral in Valletta in the late 16th century.

== Gallery ==
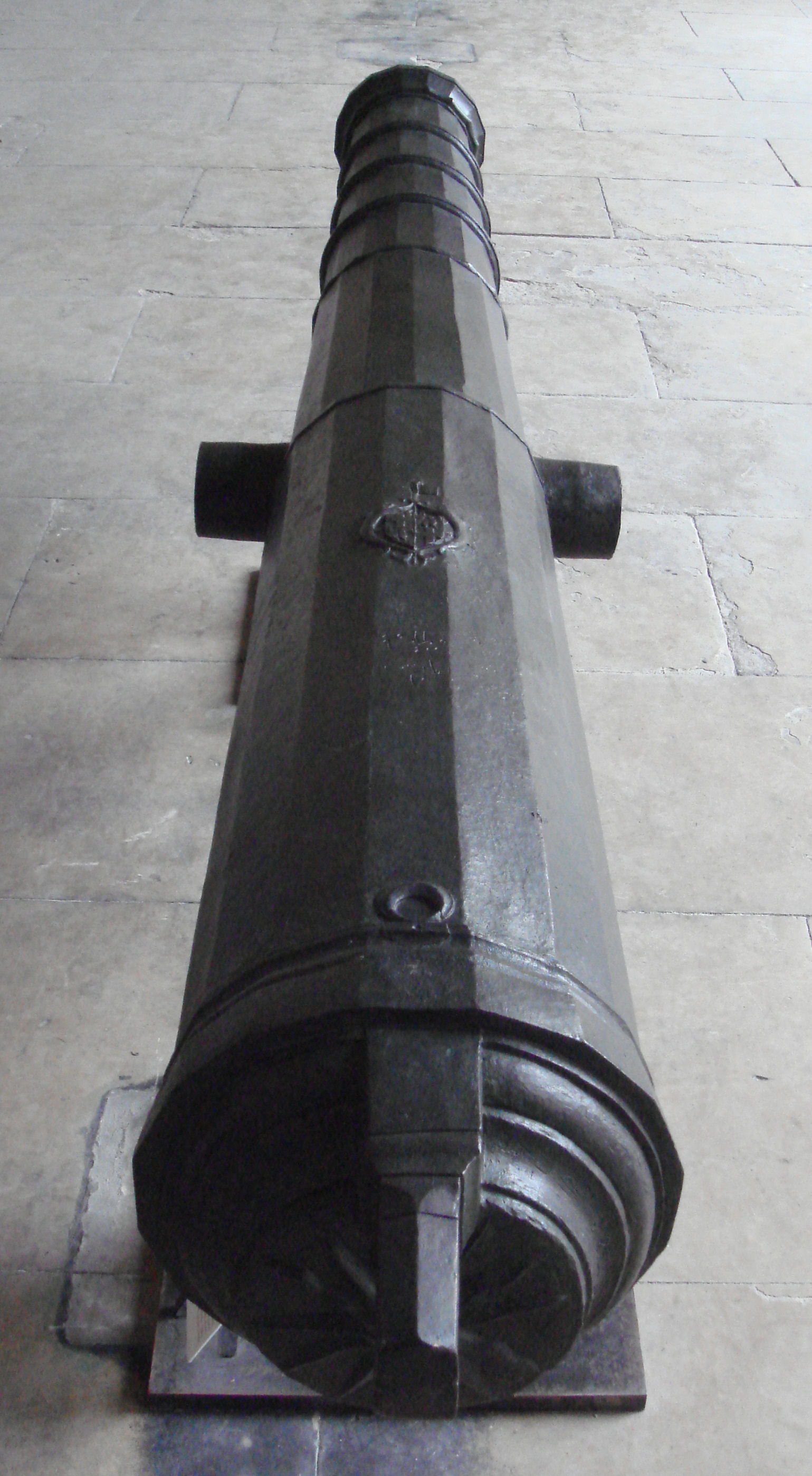
Culverin with the arms of L'Isle-Adam, Rhodes. Caliber: 140mm, length: 339 cm, weight: 2533 kg, ammunition: 10 kg iron ball. Remitted by Abdul-Aziz to Napoleon III in 1862.

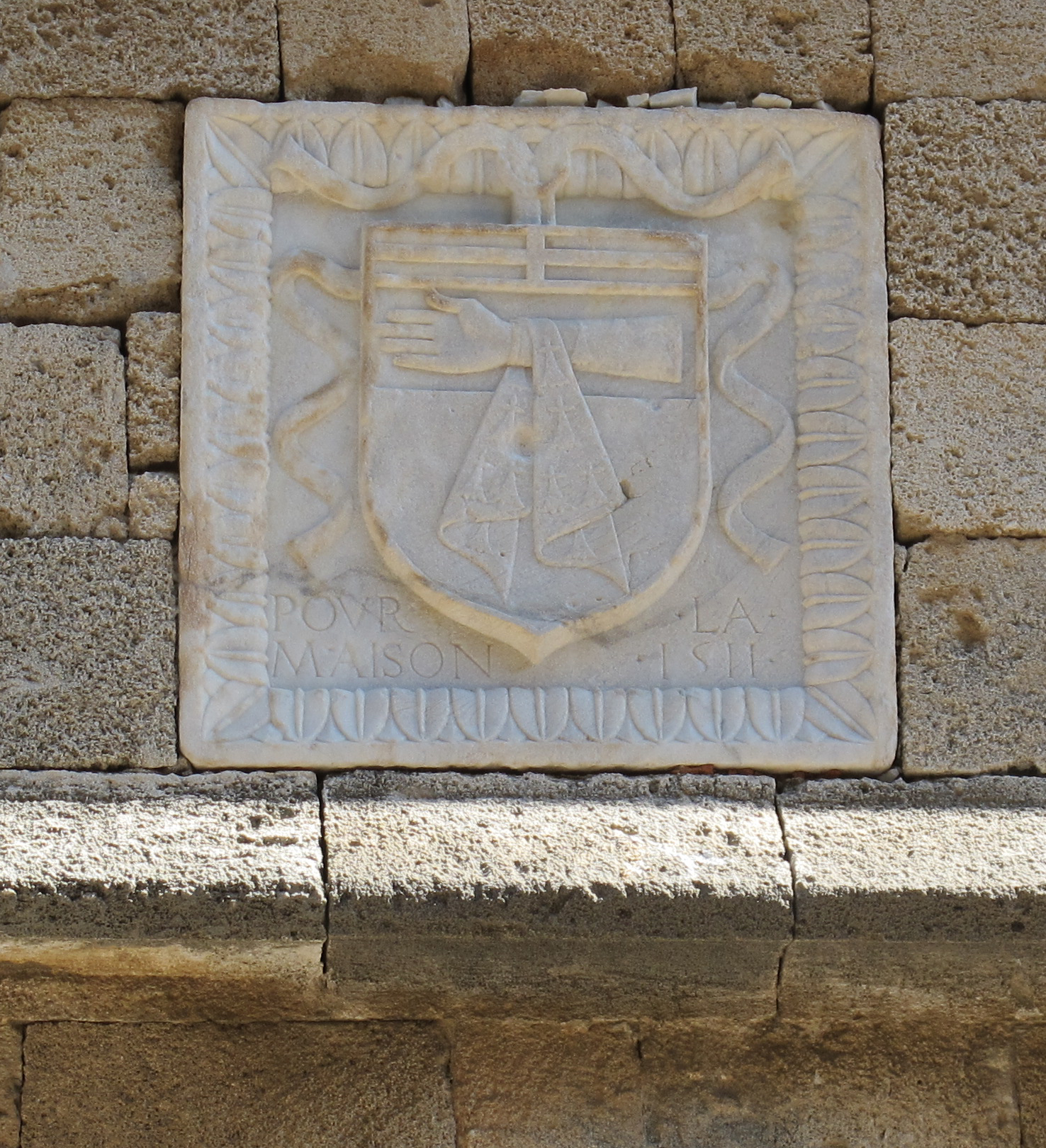
Coat of arms of L'Isle Adam in Odos Ippoton, Rhodes

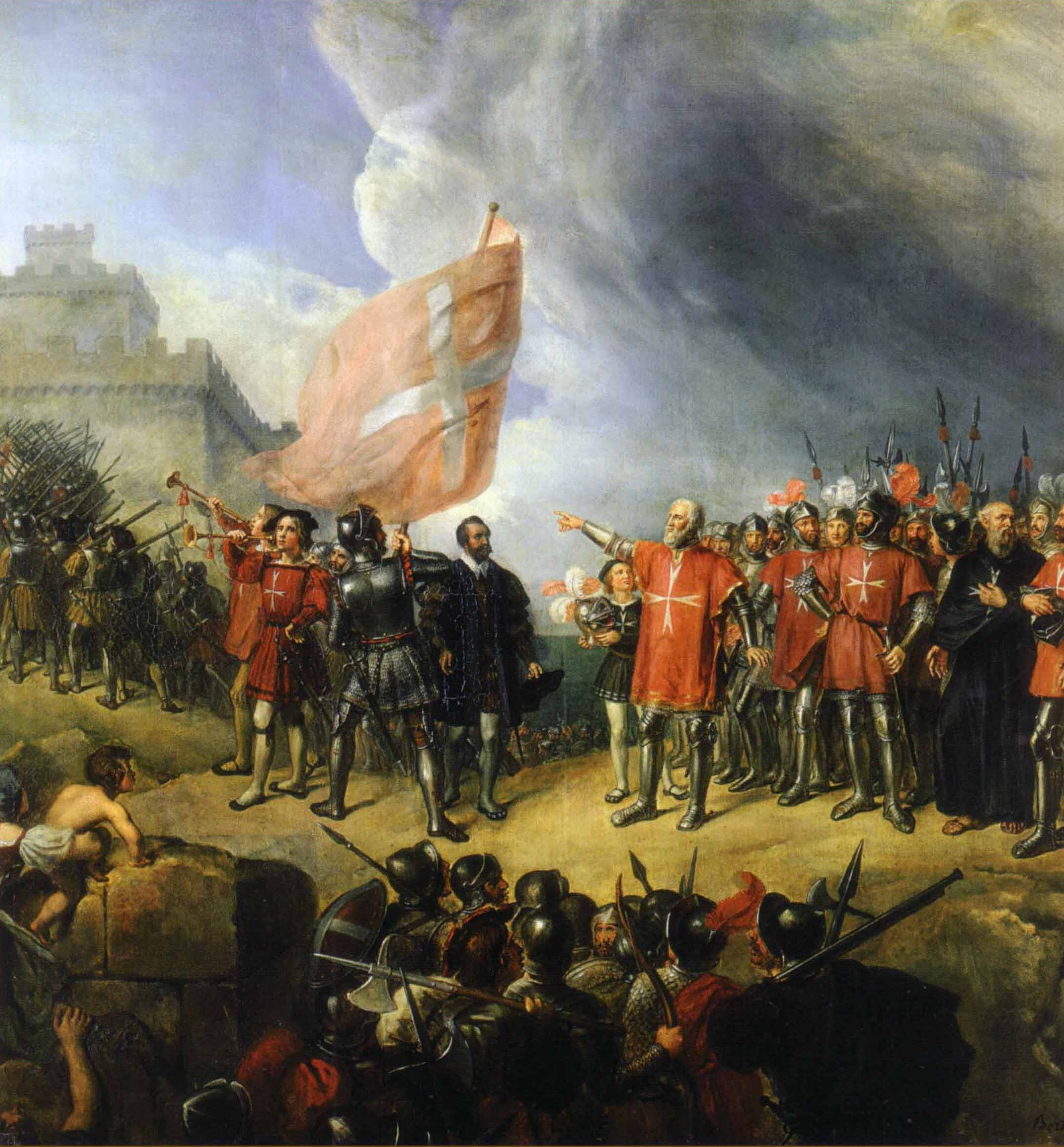
Philippe de Villiers de l'Isle Adam takes possession of the island of Malta, 26 October 1530 by René Théodore Berthon.

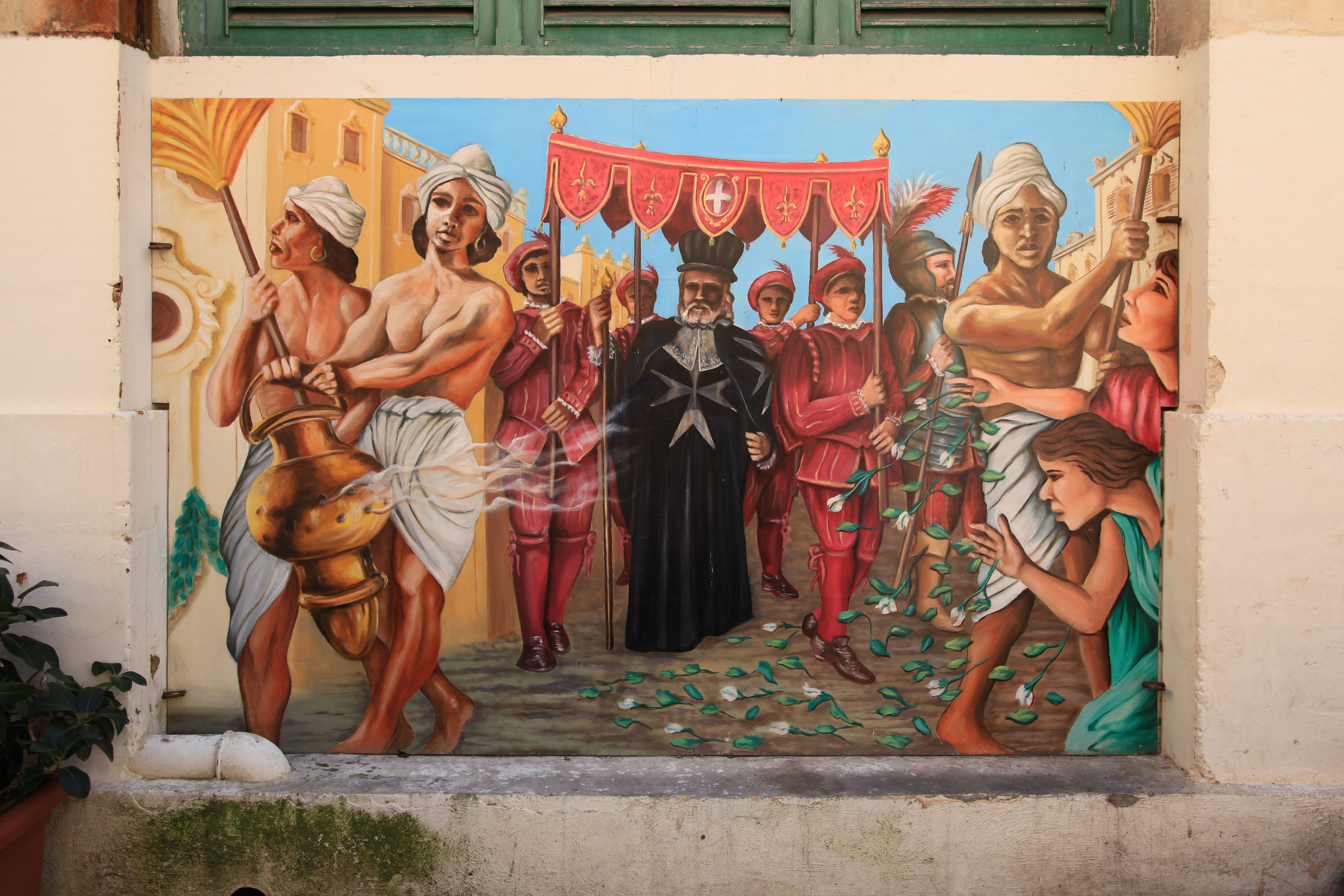
Former mural at Is-Suq tal-Belt showing L'Isle-Adam's arrival in Malta

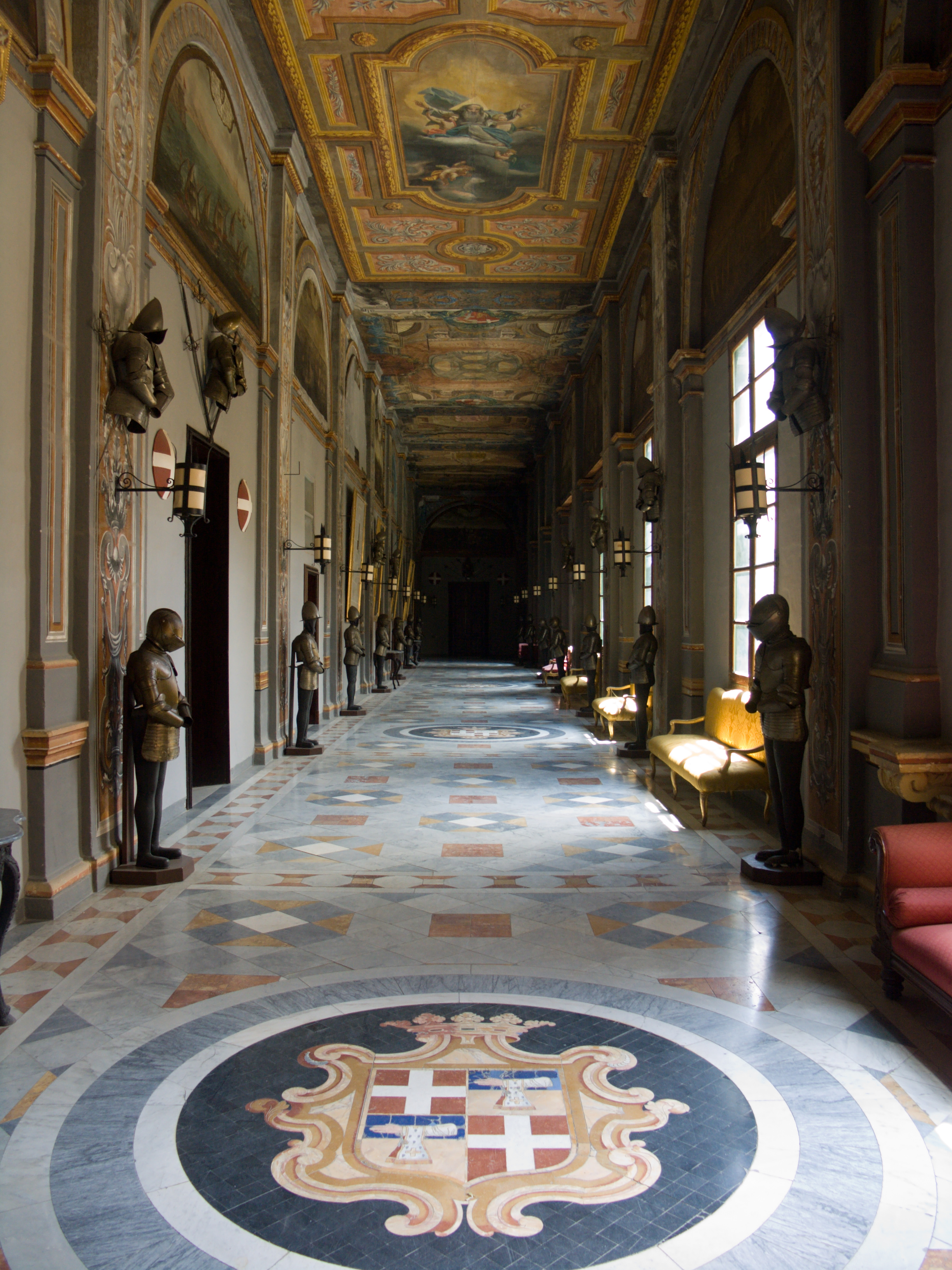
Coat of arms of L'Isle Adam at the Grandmaster's Palace.

== See also ==
- Grand Master Philippe Villiers de l'Isle Adam Taking Possession of Mdina, 18th century painting of L'Isle-Adam

Preceded by Fabrizio del Carretto	Grand Master of the Knights Hospitaller; 1521–1534	Succeeded by Piero de Ponte
