= Claude de la Sengle =

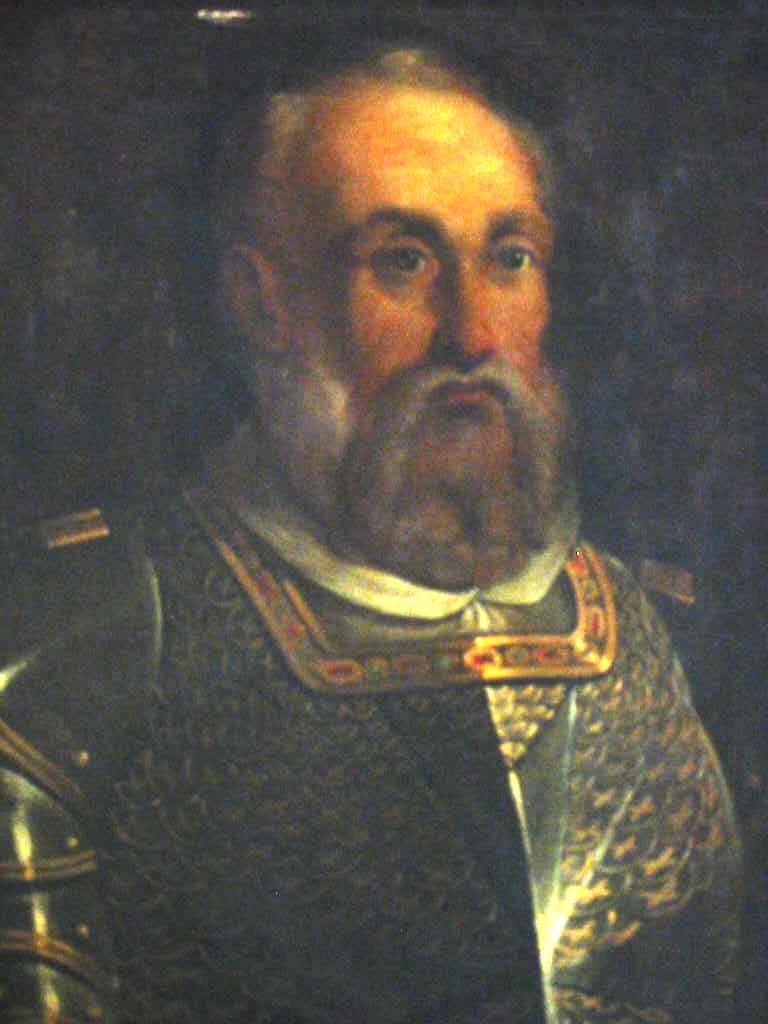

Grand Master of the Order of Saint John
- In office 11 September 1553 – 18 August 1557
- Monarchs: King Charles II; King Philip I
- Preceded by: Juan de Homedes y Coscon
- Succeeded by: Jean Parisot de Valette

Personal details
- Born: 1494 France
- Died: 18 August 1557 (aged 62–63) Mdina, Hospitaller Malta
- Resting place: Chapel of St Anne, Fort St Angelo, Birgu, later reburied at St John's Co-Cathedral, Valletta

Military service
- Allegiance: (Sovereign Military Order of Malta) Order of Saint John
- Battles/wars: Capture of Mehdia

Fra' Claude de la Sengle (1494 – 18 August 1557) was the 48th Grand Master of the Order of Malta, from 1553 to his death in 1557. His successor was Fra' Jean Parisot de Valette.

== Biography ==
A native Frenchman, Sengle, then Bailli of the French langue of the Order, was heavily involved in the battles of the Knights in the Mediterranean and in North Africa against the Ottoman corsairs led by admiral Turgut Reis, and particularly in the struggles for Djerba and Tripoli.

Coat of arms of Senglea, based on the personal arms of Claude de la Sengle.

Sengle had considerable impact on the military strengthening of Malta, notably by initiating in 1554 the development of the city of Senglea, which was later named after him and uses his coat of arms. He also expanded Fort Saint Michael into a major bastion and completed Fort Saint Elmo, which had been begun by his predecessor, Grand Master Juan de Homedes y Coscon.

Later on, Charles V wanted to grant Mehdia to the Order, but the commission that was set up decided that it would be too expensive to maintain. Therefore, Charles V ordered the Viceroy of Sicily, Juan de Vega, to destroy it to prevent Muslim occupation. Vega did burn Mehdia, but he retaliated against Malta for not accepting the city and prohibited exportation of wheat to the island. To combat this, Sengle brought the engineer Vincenzo Vogo to Malta to upgrade the mills so that the population would not starve.

The Valletta tornado probably occurred during Sengle's reign in 1555 or 1556, although some sources say that it occurred in 1551. According to some sources, four galleys named Santa Fè, San Michele, San Filippo, and San Claudio capsized in the tornado and help arrived from abroad for the Order to acquire new galleys to replace them. In 1557, Prior François de Lorena commanded five of the Order's galleys and they engaged a Muslim fleet off Rhodes. They were defeated, and many people died. The remaining galleys arrived at the Grand Harbour on 17 June, and Sengle and many others wept when they heard about the loss of loved ones.

After this defeat, Sengle's health deteriorated, and he retreated to Boschetto. He died on 18 August 1557 at Mdina and was buried in the Chapel of St Anne within Fort St. Angelo. His heart was buried in the Church of the Annunciation, outside Rabat. Later in the 16th century his remains were moved to the crypt of St. John's Co-Cathedral in Valletta.

Preceded by Juan de Homedes y Coscon	Grand Master of the Knights Hospitaller; 1553–1557	Succeeded by Jean Parisot de Valette
