= Juan de Homedes =

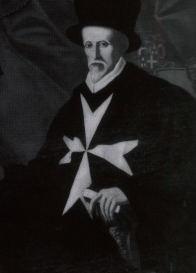

Grand Master of the Order of Saint John
- In office 20 October 1536 – 6 September 1553
- Monarch: King Charles II
- Preceded by: Didier de Saint-Jaille
- Succeeded by: Claude de la Sengle

Personal details
- Born: c.1477 Aragon (modern Spain)
- Died: 6 September 1553 (aged c.76) Hospitaller Malta
- Resting place: Chapel of St Anne, Fort St Angelo, Birgu, later reburied at St John's Co-Cathedral, Valletta

Military service
- Allegiance: (Sovereign Military Order of Malta) Order of Saint John
- Battles/wars: Siege of Rhodes; Invasion of Gozo

Fra' Juan de Homedes y Coscón (c. 1477 – 6 September 1553) was a Spanish knight of Aragon who served as the 47th Grand Master of the Order of Malta, between 1536 and 1553.

== Early life ==
Little is known about de Homedes' early life, except that he was born in Aragon in around 1477. He eventually joined the Order of Saint John on Rhodes, and fought bravely in the Ottoman siege of 1522. He eventually moved to the island of Malta along with the rest of the Order in 1530.

== Grandmastership ==
Upon the death of Didier de Saint-Jaille on 26 September 1536, de Homedes was elected by the Order and he became the 47th Grandmaster of the Order on 20 October of that year.

In July 1551, the Ottomans attempted to take Malta but were deterred and so they attacked the sister island of Gozo, which capitulated after some days of fierce fighting. Nearly the entire population of the island were taken as slaves, including the governor Gelatian de Sessa and other knights. In August of that year, the Order suffered another blow when it lost its North African stronghold of Tripoli to an Ottoman force commanded by the famous corsair leader Dragut and the admiral Sinan in the Siege of Tripoli. De Homedes blamed the loss on the military governor of Tripoli, Gaspard de Vallier, and had him defrocked and imprisoned. De Vallier was later rehabilitated by Grand Master Jean Parisot de Valette.

After the events of 1551, de Homedes began a program to fortify Malta better. The first stone for a new fort, Fort Saint Michael, was laid down on 8 May 1552 on l'Isola, a peninsula adjacent to the Order's capital at Birgu. Meanwhile Fort Saint Elmo began to be built on the Sciberras peninsula, a much larger peninsula facing both Birgu and Isola (on which the city of Valletta and the town of Floriana were later built).

De Homedes died on 6 September 1553 and was succeeded by Claude de la Sengle as Grandmaster, who continued the fortification work started by de Homedes. He was buried in the crypt of the Chapel of St Anne in Fort Saint Angelo but his remains were later moved to St. John's Co-Cathedral in Valletta.

== Portrayal in fiction ==
De Homedes is portrayed in an unflattering light in Dorothy Dunnett's 1966 novel The Disorderly Knights, which is set in 1551 during the Dragut Raid on Malta and Gozo and the subsequent fall of Tripoli. The novel shows him as miserly, cruel, partisan towards other Spanish knights, lacking in strategy, and extremely selfish.

He is also portrayed as an ineffectual and spiteful leader in Marthese Fenech's 2011 novel Eight Pointed Cross, set in Malta and the Ottoman Empire in 1542 through 1551. Eight Pointed Cross depicts the loss of Gozo and Tripoli to Dragut Raïs and Sinan Pasha, and the Order's failure to help the over five thousand civilians captured in the sieges.

De Homedes appears in The Course of Fortune by Tony Rothman (J. Bolyston, 2015), in which his role in the first siege of Malta (1551), the sack of Gozo (1551) and his prosecution of the knights after the fall of Tripoli are described in detail.

Preceded by Didier de Saint-Jaille	Grand Master of the Knights Hospitaller; 1536–1553	Succeeded by Claude de la Sengle
