= Didier de Saint-Jaille =

French nobleman (died 1536)

Grand Master of the Order of Saint John
- In office 22 November 1535 – 26 September 1536
- Monarch: King Charles II
- Preceded by: Piero del Ponte
- Succeeded by: Juan de Homedes y Coscon

Personal details
- Born: unknown France
- Died: 26 September 1536 Montpellier, France
- Resting place: Montpellier

Military service
- Allegiance: (Sovereign Military Order of Malta) Order of Saint John

Fra' Didier de Saint-Jaille (died 26 September 1536) was the 46th Grand Master of the Order of Saint John between 1535 and 1536.

De Saint-Jaille was a French nobleman who joined the Knights Hospitaller as part of the Langue of France. He was particularly known for his great prudence, and was elected as Grandmaster following Piero de Ponte's death. At the time he was in France, and so made preparations to go to Malta. However, he fell ill at Montpellier and died before he made it to the island on 26 September 1536.

He was the only Grand Master of Malta who did not die and was not buried in Malta, apart from Ferdinand von Hompesch zu Bolheim, who left the islands with the Order's expulsion in 1798. Coincidentally, both Didier de Saint-Jaille and Hompesch are buried in Montpellier.

While he was away from Malta, the knight Jacques Pelliquen acted as Lieutenant Grandmaster, and during his rule Maltese and Calabrian soldiers destroyed El Haid Tower which was close to Tripoli (then a possession of the Order).

Preceded by Piero de Ponte	Grand Master of the Knights Hospitaller; 1535–1536	Succeeded by Juan de Homedes y Coscon
