= Church of Mary's Nativity within the Fort =

Church of the Nativity of Mary
- The Church of Mary's Nativity within the Fort
- Knisja tan-Nativita' ta' Marija
- Church of the Nativity of Mary
- 35°53′31″N 14°31′06″E
- Location: Birgu
- Country: Malta
- Denomination: Roman Catholic

History
- Former name: St Angelo's Church
- Status: Church
- Dedication: Nativity of Mary

Specifications
- Length: 12 m (39 ft 4 in)
- Height: 5 m (16 ft 5 in)

Administration
- Archdiocese: Malta
- Parish: Birgu

The Church of the Nativity of Mary is a Roman Catholic church located within the historical Fort St. Angelo, in Birgu, Malta.

== History ==
The origins of this church, built within the fort walls, is unknown. However it is known that by 1274, the church already existed. Historians assume that the church was probably built during the late 11th century, after Roger I of Sicily arrived in Malta and reconquered the island from the Moors. It is said that the church was built as a thanksgiving by the Christians for the liberation of Malta from Muslim rule. The church is mentioned for the first time in 1274, under the name of St Angelo, when an inventory of the items located in the church was listed. Other records also list this church as the first parish church of the Castrum Maris or Castle by the Sea, as the fort was named in that time. In 1409, Blanche I of Navarre assigned the church under the care of Canon Ruġġieru Segona. By time, the church was used less frequently as people started to use the Parish church of St Laurence in Birgu instead. Consequently, the church was given under the jurisdiction of the Archpriest of Birgu.

Interior of the church

== Occupation and access ==
Since this church was located within a castle which was usually used by the rulers who ruled Malta and hence was usually closed to the public, the public still had access to this chapel due to the fact that it was under the jurisdiction of the Bishop of Malta. It remained so when the Knights arrived in 1530. Nonetheless, there were numerous clashes of authority between the Order and the Bishop, notably the incident of 1621, when Bishop Baldassare Cagliares formally protested against the obstacles he faced when attempting to visit the church. Access to the church was heavily restricted with the arrival of the British in 1800. However, access to the church was still given once a year on September 8 to commemorate Victory day. This went on until 1940 the church was destroyed by a direct hit by the luftwaffe during WWII. The church was restored in 1955. Nowadays, the church stands on government property however, the church is still under the jurisdiction of the Archdiocese of Malta.

== Interior ==
Originally this church had one altar and a painting depicting the Virgin Mary with baby Jesus. Two other side altars were added sometime later, one dedicated to St Angelo, patron of the fort, while the other to Saint Barbara. In 1658, pilasters were added to the interior.
