= HMS Egmont =

Several ships of the Royal Navy have been named HMS Egmont:

- HMS Egmont (1768), a 74-gun third-rate ship of the line launched in 1768, and broken up in 1799.
- HMS Egmont (1776) was a schooner of eight guns and 100 tons burthen, launched in 1768. The Royal Navy purchased her but she foundered on 12 July 1776 while attempting to enter Trepassy, Newfoundland, while under the command of Lieutenant Alexander Christie.
- HMS Egmont (1778) was a schooner of eight guns and 199 tons burthen, purchased in 1778. On 14 July 1779, Egmont, under the command of Lieutenant John Gardiner, encountered the American privateer brig Wildcat. Egmont attempted to escape but was forced to strike after having lost two men killed, one of them by the boarding party from Wildcat. On 16 July, HMS Surprise was able to capture Wildcat, of 14 guns and 75 men, ten weeks off the stocks, and free Lieutenant Gardiner and 20 of his men who were aboard her, but Egmont herself had separated earlier. The Royal Navy took Wildcat into service as Trepassey.
- HMS Egmont (1810), another 74-gun third rate ship of the line, launched in 1810 and sold in 1875.
- HMS Egmont, between 1904 and 1914, (ironclad, formerly HMS Achilles (1863), renamed 1904)
- Fort St Angelo in Birgu, Malta (1912–1933). A stone frigate, so named when the above-mentioned HMS Achilles was used as a depot ship.
