= Chapel of St Anne, Fort St Angelo =

Chapel of St Anne
- Kappella ta' Sant'Anna
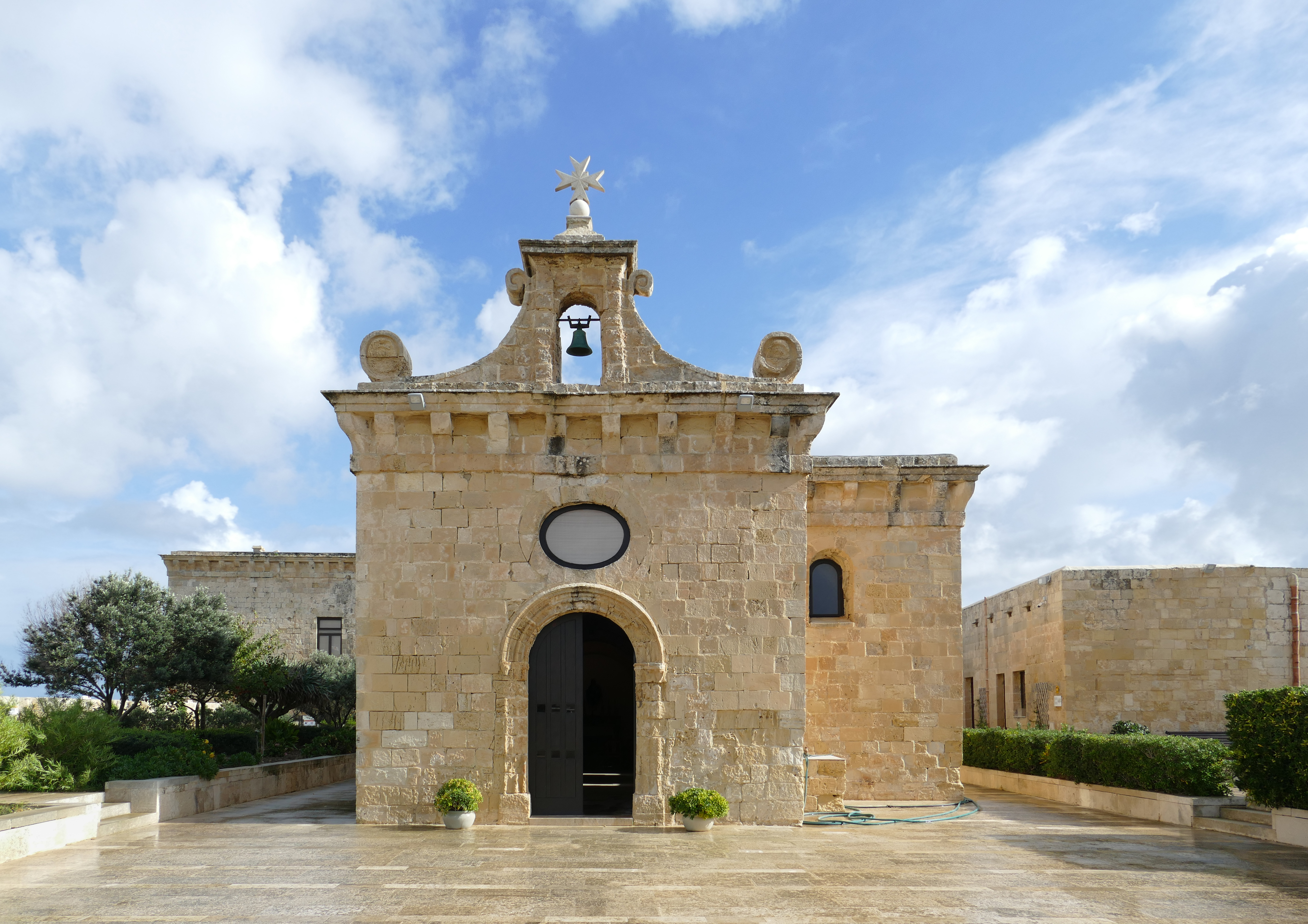
- The chapel's façade in 2019
- Chapel of St Anne
- 35°53′33″N 14°31′03″E
- Location: Fort St Angelo, Birgu, Malta
- Denomination: Roman Catholic
- Previous denomination: Church of England (20th century, briefly)

History
- Status: Chapel
- Founded: 1274 or earlier
- Dedication: Saint Anne
- Earlier dedication: Saint Angelo; Assumption of Mary; Epiphany

Architecture
- Functional status: Active
- Years built: c. 1430; 1532 (enlargement)

Specifications
- Materials: Limestone

The Chapel of St Anne (Maltese: Kappella ta' Sant'Anna) is a Roman Catholic chapel in Fort St Angelo in Birgu, Malta. Its existence was first documented in the 13th century, and according to tradition it stands on the site of an ancient temple. The present building was constructed around 1430 and it was enlarged in 1532 by the Order of St John. The building ceased to function as a chapel in 1798, and it was used as a store, as a school and as a Church of England chapel before being converted back to a Catholic chapel in the mid-20th century. It has been restored and it is now managed by the Sovereign Military Order of Malta.

== History ==
According to tradition, the site of the church was formerly occupied by a Phoenician temple of Astarte, which was later rededicated to Juno by the Romans. The chapel was founded in the medieval period, and it was first attested in an Angevin document from 1274. It was originally dedicated to Saint Angelo and it was located at the upper level of a castle known as the Castrum Maris. The castle and chapel were eventually taken over by the De Nava family. The present chapel is believed to have been constructed by the De Nava castellan in around 1430. At some points, the chapel might have been dedicated to the Assumption of Mary and the Epiphany.

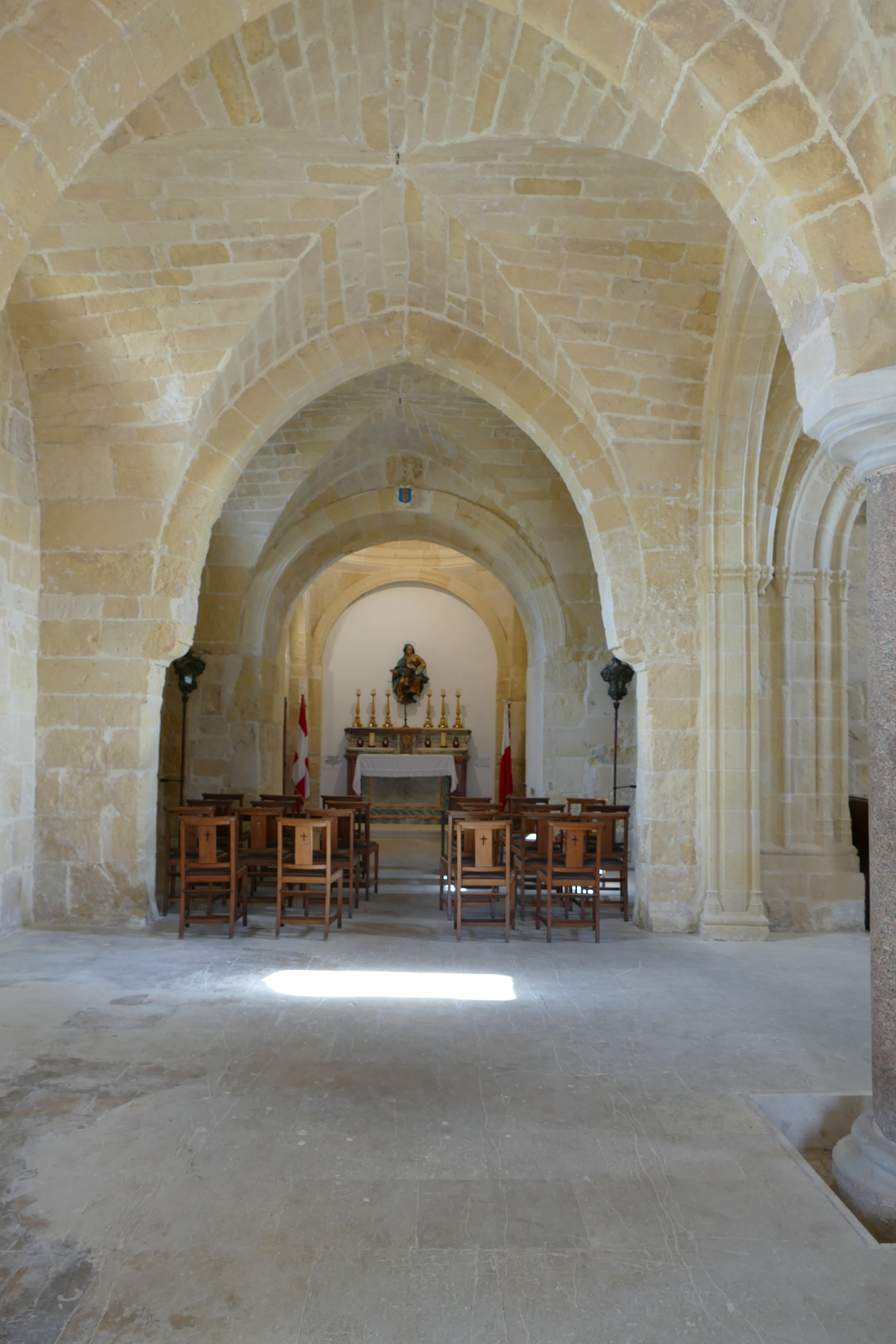
The chapel's interior in 2019

The Order of St John took control of the Castrum Maris after Malta came under their rule in 1530, and the castle was gradually converted into a fortress known as Fort St Angelo. Grand Master Philippe Villiers de L'Isle-Adam enlarged the chapel in 1532 and converted it for his own personal use. It was also used to house the Order's repository of relics. It remained a private chapel for subsequent Hospitaller Grand Masters until the Order moved its base to Valletta in 1571.

The chapel lost its importance at this point, but it remained in use as a church by the fort's garrison until the French occupation of Malta in 1798. In the 19th century, when Malta was under British rule, the former chapel was used as a store for arms and ammunition, and in 1882 it was converted into a school. The chapel was no longer in use by the 1920s, but it was later reconsecrated as a Church of England chapel for British naval personnel stationed within the fort. After World War II, it was converted back to a Roman Catholic chapel for the fort's Maltese workers, and it was open to the general public annually on Victory Day. Fort St Angelo remained in British hands until 1979, after which the chapel was closed.

The chapel was restored in 1994. Through a treaty dated 5 December 1998 and ratified on 1 November 2001, the upper parts of the fort including the chapel were granted to the Sovereign Military Order of Malta, and the chapel was only open to the public on Victory Day. Extensive restoration of Fort St Angelo took place between 2012 and 2015, and the fort is now open to the public as a museum. Daily guided tours to the chapel were made available in 2016, and it became fully accessible to paying visitors in 2019.

== Architecture ==
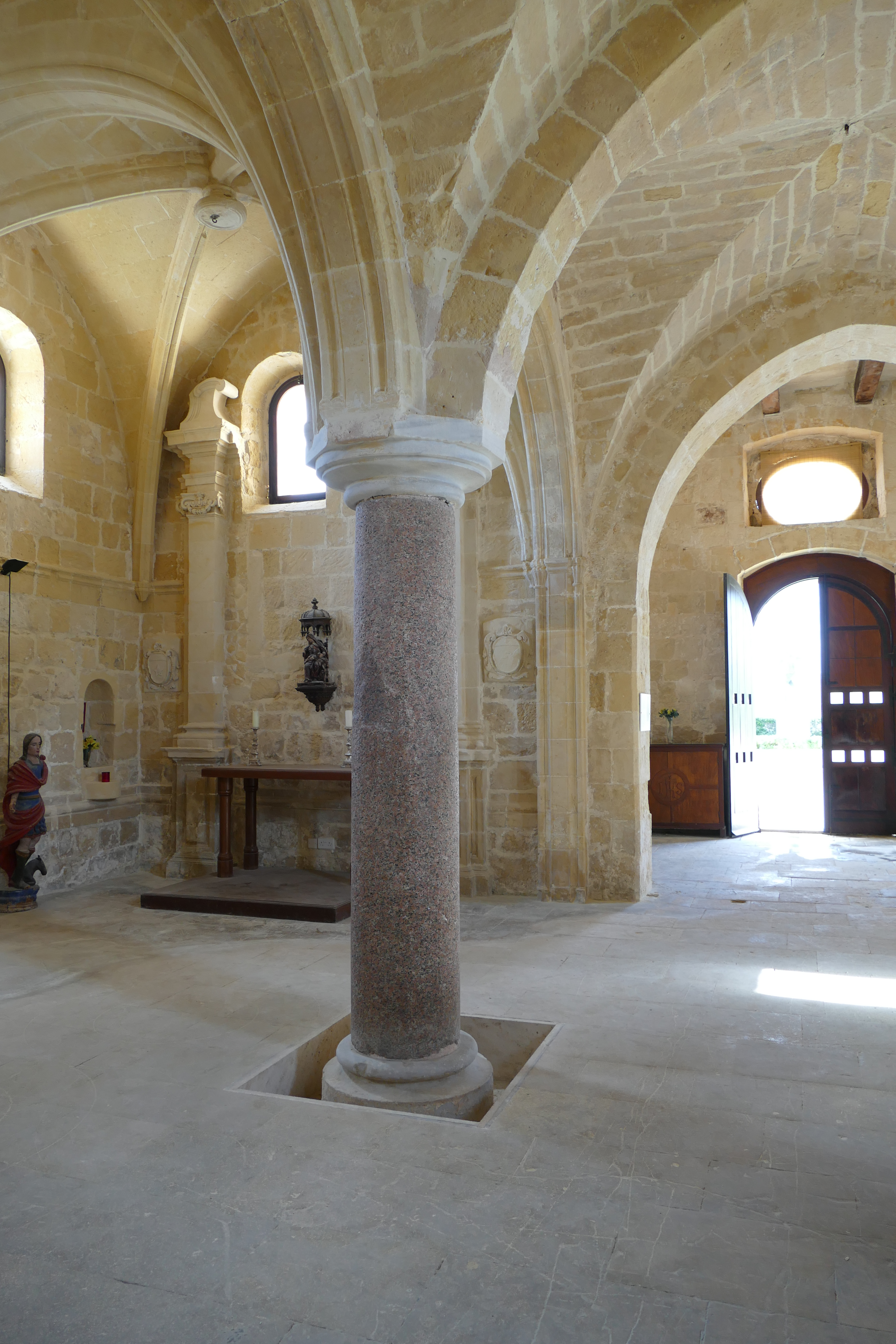
The granite column which is believed to predate the chapel

The chapel's façade contains an arched doorway and an oval window, and it is topped by a cornice and a bell-cot. The latter is topped by a stone Maltese cross and it contains a single bronze bell. A blocked pointed arch is located on the chapel's left wall.

The building has an asymmetric plan and internally it contains a large nave and several altars. Its roof is typical of 15th-century Maltese architecture. The roof is held up by a pink granite column which is of Egyptian origin and which might have formed part of an ancient temple predating the chapel. This column is said to have been retrieved from the seabed.

A crypt is located underneath the chapel and it can be accessed through a staircase. The following Grand Masters were originally buried within this crypt, but their remains were moved to St John's Co-Cathedral in Valletta in the late 16th century:

- Philippe Villiers de L'Isle-Adam (died 1534)
- Piero de Ponte (died 1535)
- Juan de Homedes (died 1553)
- Claude de la Sengle (died 1557)
