= Siege of Rhodes (1522) =

Part of the Ottoman wars in Europe

Coordinates: 36.4423°N 28.2270°E

- Part of the Ottoman wars in Europe
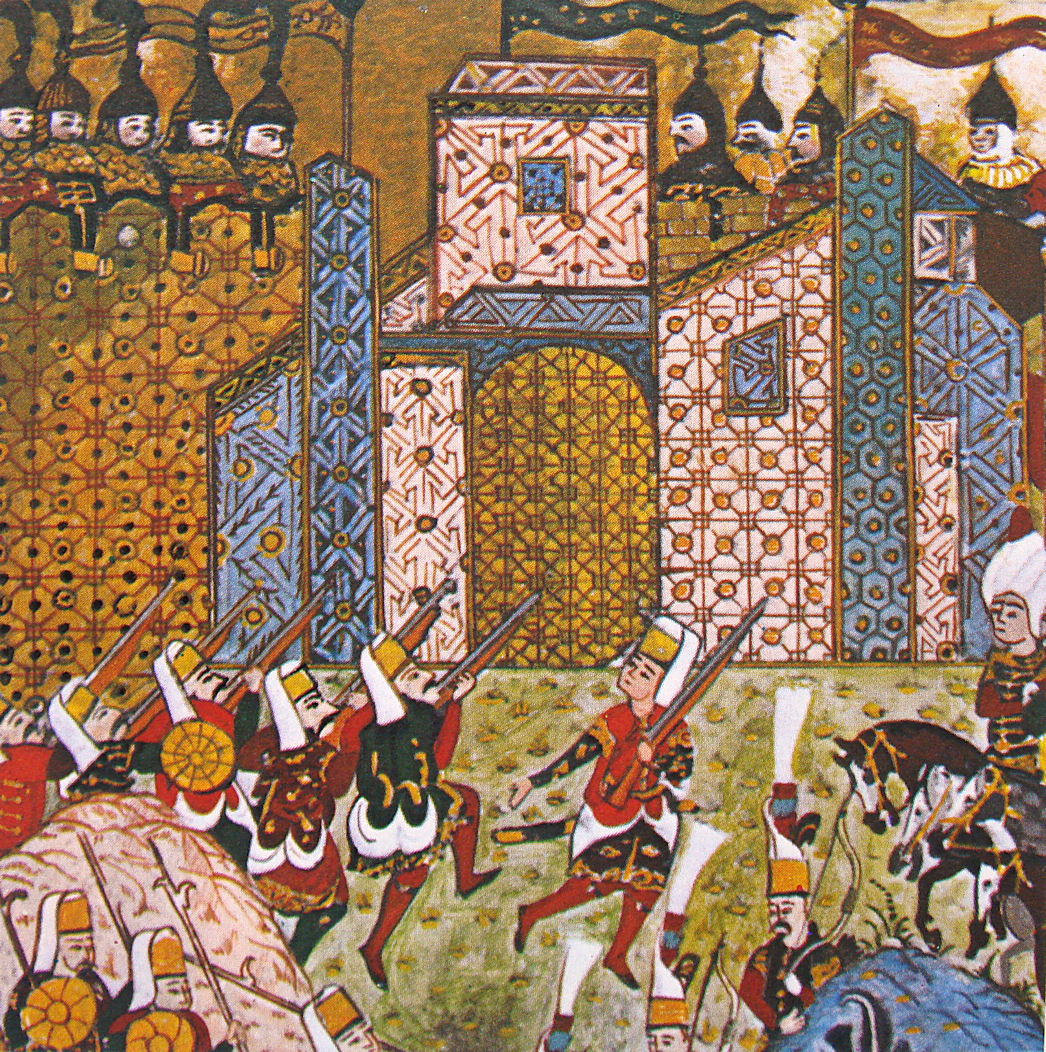
- Gun-wielding Ottoman Janissaries and defending Knights of Saint John at the siege of Rhodes, miniature from Süleymannâme
Date	26 June – 22 December 1522
Location	Rhodes
Result	Ottoman victory
Territorial changes	Rhodes brought under Ottoman rule

Belligerents
Ottoman Empire	(Sovereign Military Order of Malta) Knights Hospitaller; Republic of Venice

Commanders and leaders
Suleiman the Magnificent; Çoban Mustafa Pasha; Kurtoğlu Muslihiddin Reis	Philippe Villiers de L'Isle-Adam

Strength
180,000–100,000 men 400 ships 72 guns and mortars	6,703 men (703 Knights Hospitallers of St. John, including men from Spain, France, Germany, Italy, England, and Portugal)

Casualties and losses
60,000 dead Christian claims: 114,000 dead (50,000 from disease & 64,000 from battle)	5,020 dead (Note: 520 Knights of Hospitaller 5,400 soldiers)

The siege of Rhodes of 1522 was the second and ultimately successful attempt by the Ottoman Empire to expel the Knights of Rhodes from their island stronghold and thereby secure Ottoman control of the Eastern Mediterranean. The first siege in 1480 had been unsuccessful. Despite very strong defenses, the walls were demolished over the course of six months by Turkish artillery and mines.

== Setting ==
The Knights of St. John, or Knights Hospitallers, had captured Rhodes in the early 14th century after the loss in 1291 of Acre, the last Crusader stronghold in Palestine. From Rhodes, they became an active part of the trade in the Aegean Sea, and at times harassed Turkish shipping in the Levant to secure control over the eastern Mediterranean. A first effort by the Ottomans to capture the island was repulsed by the order in 1480, but the continuing presence of the knights just off the southern coast of Anatolia was a major obstacle to Ottoman expansion. An earthquake shook the island in 1481.

After the siege and earthquake, the fortress was greatly strengthened against artillery according to the new school of trace italienne. In the most exposed land-facing sectors, the improvements included a thickening of the main wall, doubling of the width of the dry ditch, coupled with a transformation of the old counterscarp into massive outworks (tenailles), the construction of bulwarks around most towers, and caponiers enfilading the ditch. Gates were reduced in number, and the old battlement parapets were replaced with slanting ones suitable for artillery fights. A team of masons, labourers, and slaves did the construction work, with the Muslim slaves charged with the hardest labour.

In 1521, Philippe Villiers de L'Isle-Adam was elected grand master of the order. Expecting a new Ottoman attack on Rhodes, he continued to strengthen the city's fortifications, and called upon the order's knights elsewhere in Europe to come to the island's defence. The rest of Europe ignored his request for assistance, but Sir John Rawson, prior of the order's Irish House, came alone. The city was protected by two and, in some places three, rings of stone walls and several large bastions. The defence was assigned in sections to the different Langues. The harbour entrance was blocked by a heavy iron chain, behind which the order's fleet was anchored.

The sultan, Suleiman, was convinced to attack Rhodes by Piri Mehmed Pasha. Piri, Çoban and Kurtoğlu participated in the divan meetings, and Piri urged the Sultan to hurry to Rhodes. He then went to war with the Sultan.

== Invasion ==
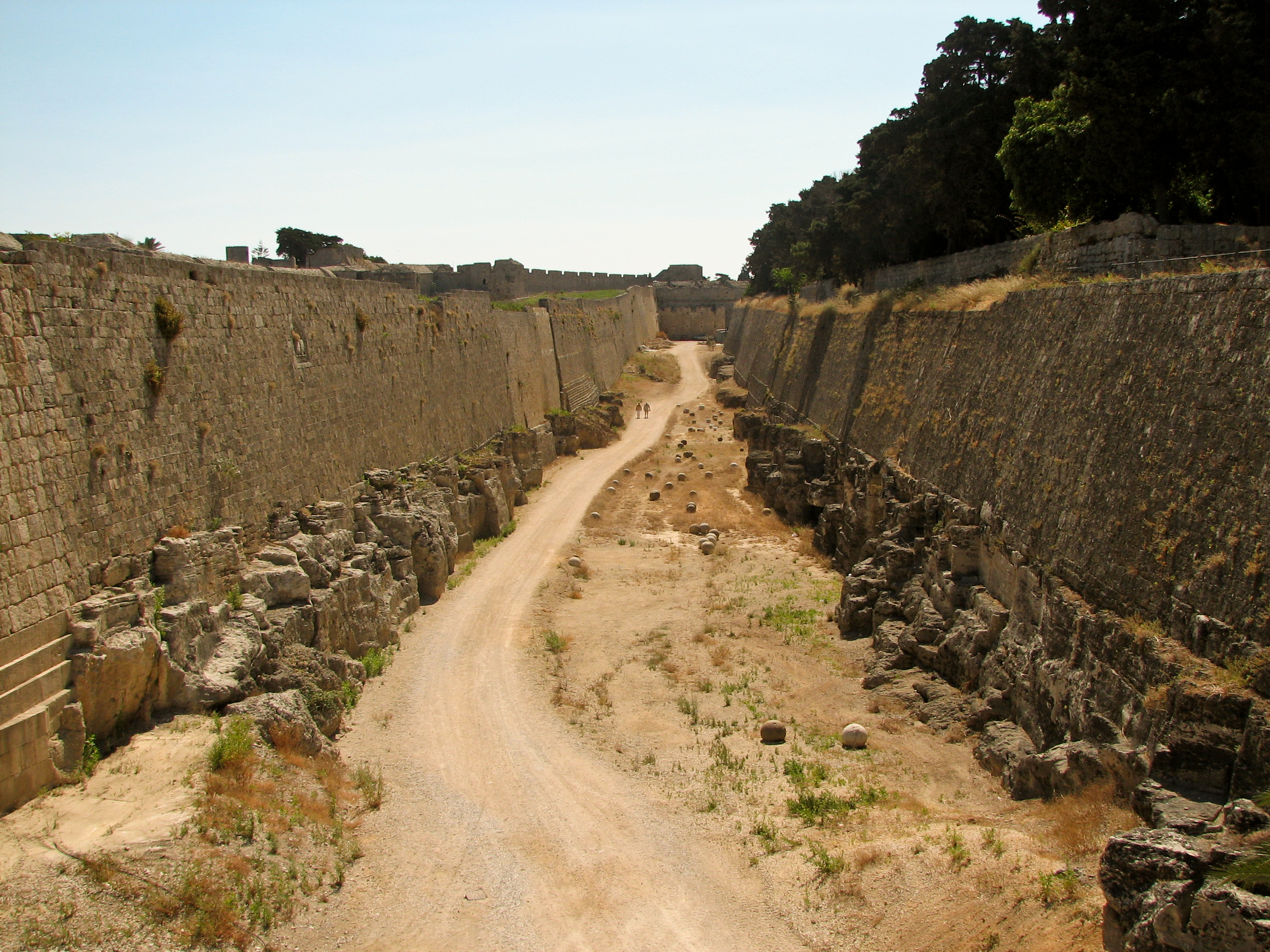
The English Post, the scene of heaviest fighting; the tenaille is on the left and the main wall is further behind it, visible in the background; on the right of the wide dry ditch is the counterscarp that the attackers had to climb down before storming the city wall. The ditch is enfiladed by the Tower of St. John, its bulwark and lower wall providing vertically stacked fields of overlapping fire. The stone cannonballs seen in the ditch are from the fighting.

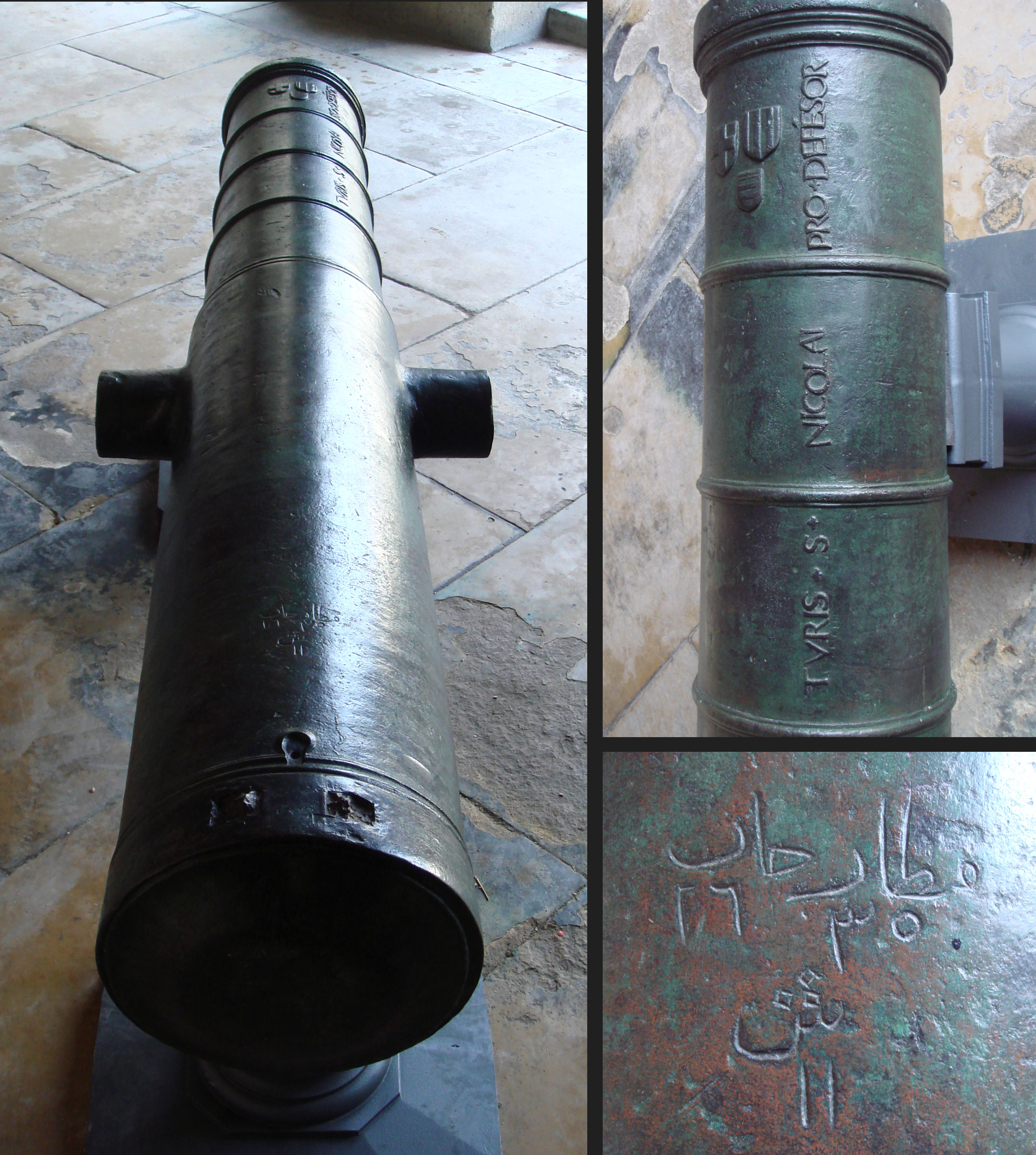
Cannon of the Hospitallers at Saint-Nicholas Tower (Tour Saint-Nicolas), 1510, Rhodes. Arms of Emery d'Amboise, with Ottoman Turkish inscriptions Vitar: 35, Chap: 16, Sh (for Qarish): 11. Latin inscription TURIS + S + NICOLAI + PRO + DEFÉSOR, "For the defence of Saint-Nicholas Tower". Caliber: 23.0 centimetres (9.1 in) length: 255 centimetres (100 in) weight:1,427 kilograms (3,146 lb). Remitted by Abdülaziz to Napoleon III in 1862.

When the Turkish invasion force of 400 ships arrived on Rhodes on 26 June 1522, they were commanded by Çoban Mustafa Pasha. Suleiman himself arrived with the army of 100,000 men on 28 July to take personal charge.

The Turks blockaded the harbour and bombarded the town with field artillery from the land side, followed by almost daily infantry attacks. They also sought to undermine the fortifications through tunnels and mines. The artillery fire was slow in inflicting serious damage to the massive walls, but after five weeks, on 4 September, two large gunpowder mines exploded under the bastion of England, causing a 12-yard (11 m) portion of the wall to fall into the moat. The attackers immediately assaulted this breach and soon gained control of it, but a counterattack by the English brothers under Fra' Nicholas Hussey and Grand Master Villiers de L'Isle-Adam succeeded in driving them back. Twice more the Turks assaulted the breach that day, but the English and German brothers held the gap.

On 24 September, Mustafa Pasha ordered a massive assault upon the bastions of Spain, England, Provence, and Italy. After a day of furious fighting, during which the bastion of Spain changed hands twice, Suleiman eventually called off the attack. He sentenced Mustafa Pasha, his brother-in-law, to death for his failure to take the city, but eventually spared his life after the pleas of other senior officials. Mustafa's replacement, Ahmed Pasha, was an experienced siege engineer, and the Turks now focused their efforts on undermining the ramparts and blowing them up with mines while maintaining their continuous artillery barrages. The regularity of the locations where the mines were detonated under the walls (which generally rest on rock) has led to the suggestion that the Turkish miners may have taken advantage of ancient culverts of the Hellenistic city buried beneath the medieval city of Rhodes.

Another major assault at the end of November was repelled, but both sides were now exhausted—the knights were reaching the end of their strength with no relief forces expected, while the Turkish troops were increasingly demoralized and depleted by combat fatalities and disease in their camps. Suleiman offered the defenders peace, their lives, and food if they surrendered, but death or slavery if the Turks were compelled to take the city by force. Pressed by the townspeople, Villiers de L'Isle-Adam agreed to negotiate. A truce was declared for 11–13 December to allow negotiations, but when the locals demanded further assurances for their safety, Suleiman was angered and ordered the bombardment and assaults to resume. The bastion of Spain fell on 17 December. With most of the walls now destroyed, it was only a matter of time before the city was forced to surrender. On 20 December, after several days of pressure from the townspeople, the Grand Master asked for a fresh truce.

== End ==
On 22 December, the representatives of the city's Latin and Greek inhabitants accepted Suleiman's terms, which were generous. The knights were given twelve days to leave the island and would be allowed to take their weapons, valuables, and religious icons. Islanders who wished to leave could do so at any time within a three-year period. No church would be desecrated or turned into a mosque. Those remaining on the island would be free of Ottoman taxation for five years.

On 1 January 1523, the remaining knights and soldiers marched out of the town, with banners flying, drums beating, and in battle armour. They boarded the 50 ships which had been made available to them and sailed to Crete (then called Kingdom of Candia, a Venetian possession), accompanied by several thousand civilians.

== Aftermath ==
The siege of Rhodes ended with an Ottoman victory. The conquest of Rhodes was a major step towards Ottoman control over the eastern Mediterranean and greatly eased their maritime communications between Constantinople and Cairo and the Levantine ports. Eventually, in 1669, from this base Ottoman Turks captured Venetian Crete.

The Knights Hospitaller initially moved to Sicily, but, in 1530, were granted by Emperor Charles V the islands of Malta, Gozo, and the North African port city of Tripoli, following an agreement with Pope Clement VII, himself a knight.

In 1523, the Ottomans resettled 150 Jewish families from Thessaloniki in Rhodes.

Piri Mehmed Pasha played an important role in the expedition. However, upon his return to Istanbul he faced accusations of bribery relating to an alleged previous incident in Egypt, possibly fabricated by his rival Ahmed Pasha, who sought to strip him of his title of grand vizier.

== In popular culture ==
- In 1656, William Davenant wrote the first English opera, The Siege of Rhodes, based on the incident.

== Gallery ==
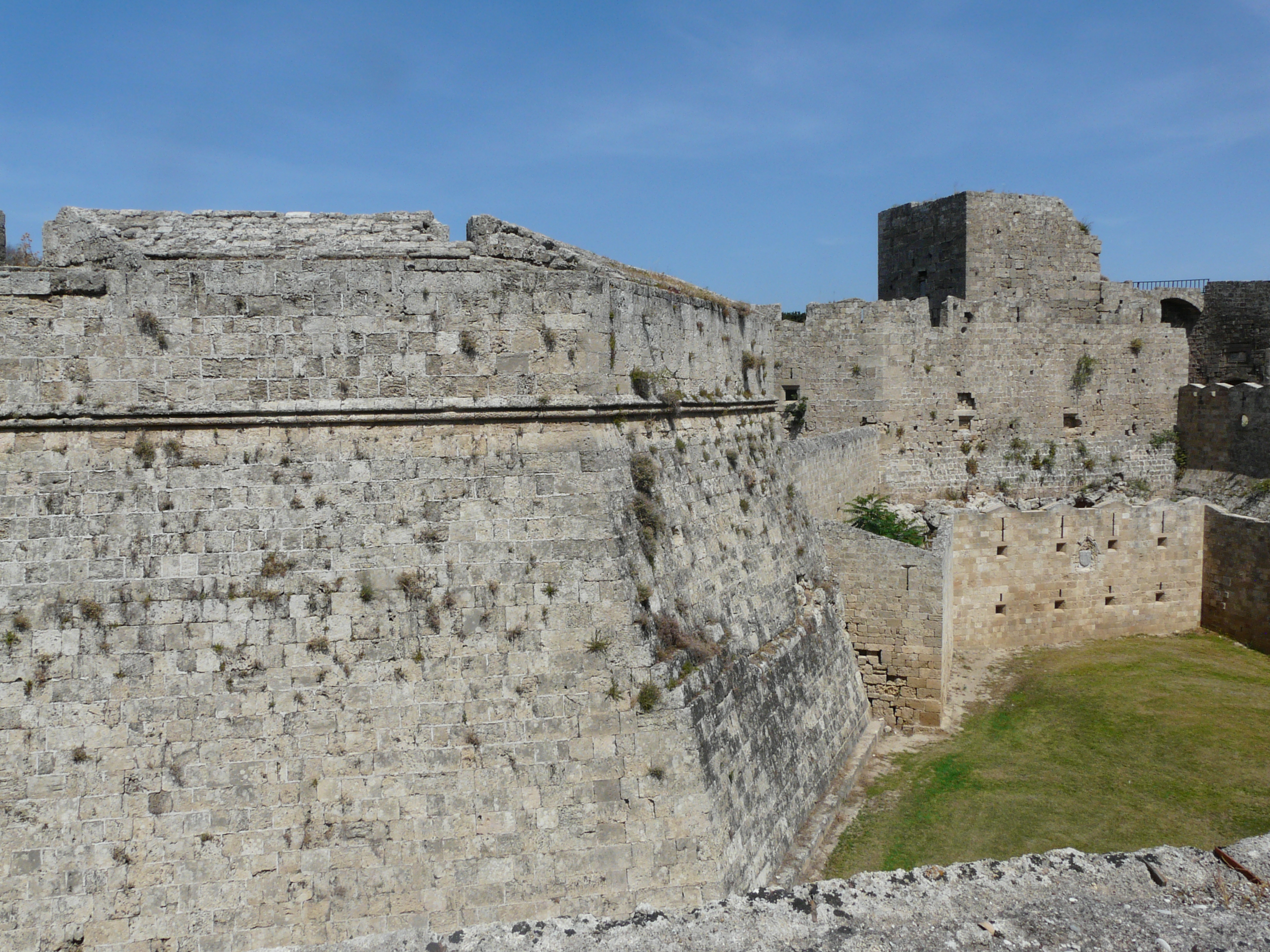
The Tower of St. John at the east end of the English sector. The tower was built under Grand Master Antonio Fluvian (1421–1437), and it had a gate. Later a barbican was built around it under Grand Master Piero Raimundo Zacosta (1461–1467). Finally the large pentagonal bulwark was built in front of it c. 1487, and the gate was removed.

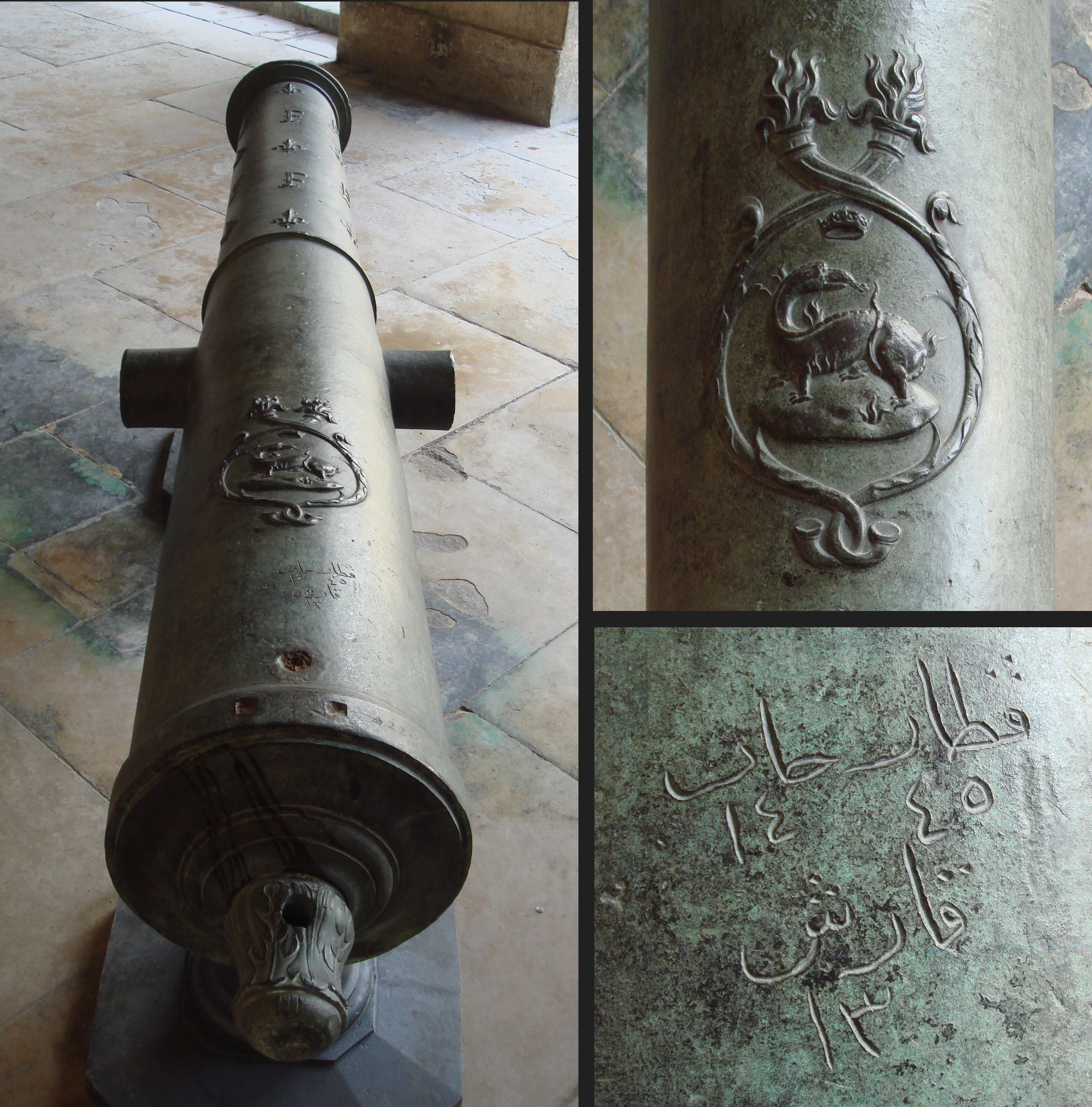
Grand culverin of Francis I of France with salamander emblem and inscription in Ottoman Turkish Vitar: 45, Chap: 14, Qarish: 13. Siege of Rhodes (1522), Musée de l'Armée.

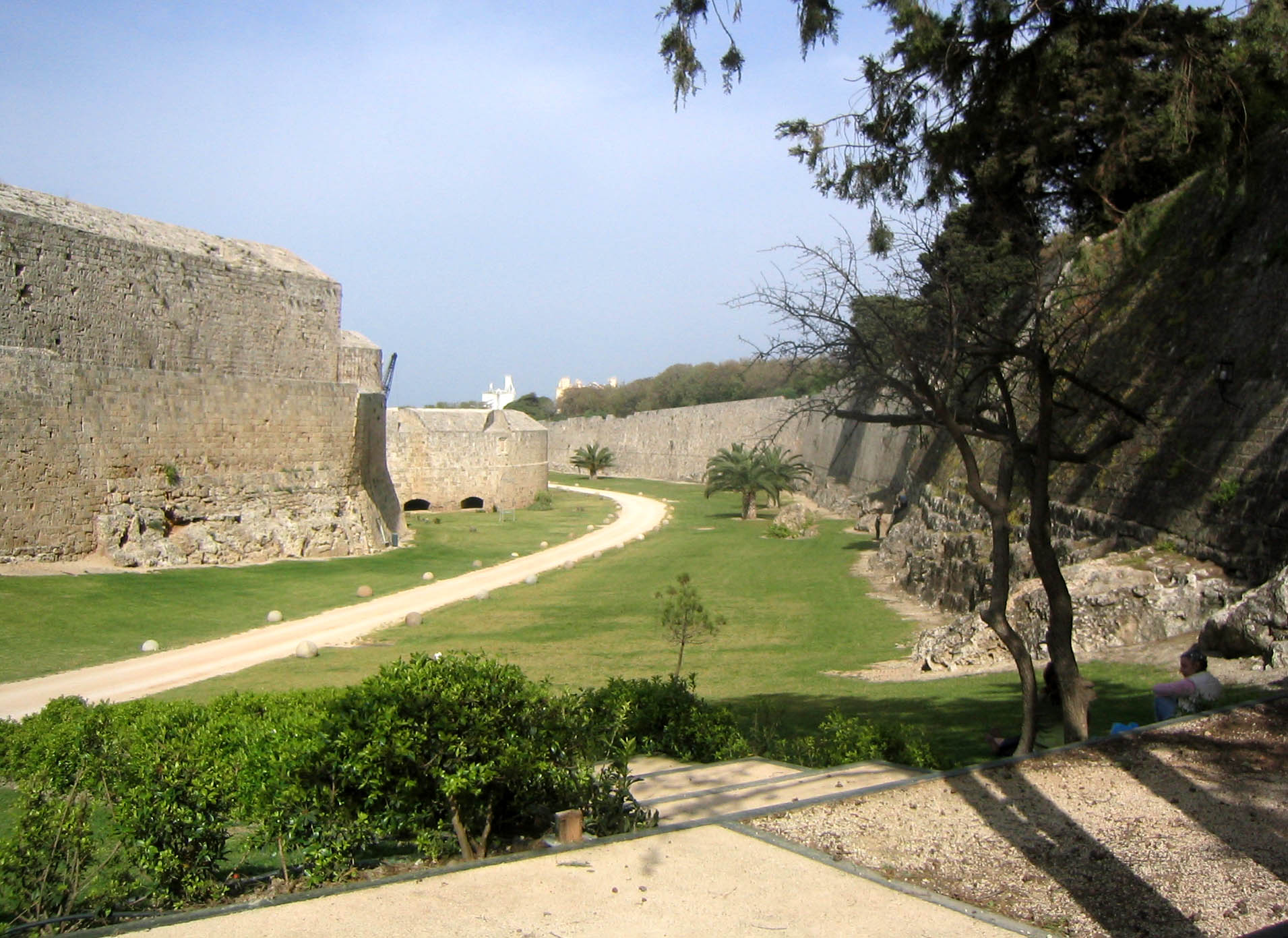
The Tower of Italy had a round bulwark built around by Grand Master Fabrizio del Carretto in 1515–1517, and provided with gun ports at the lowest level covering the ditch in every direction, for a total of three stacked tiers of cannon fire (two from the bulwark, one from the tower).

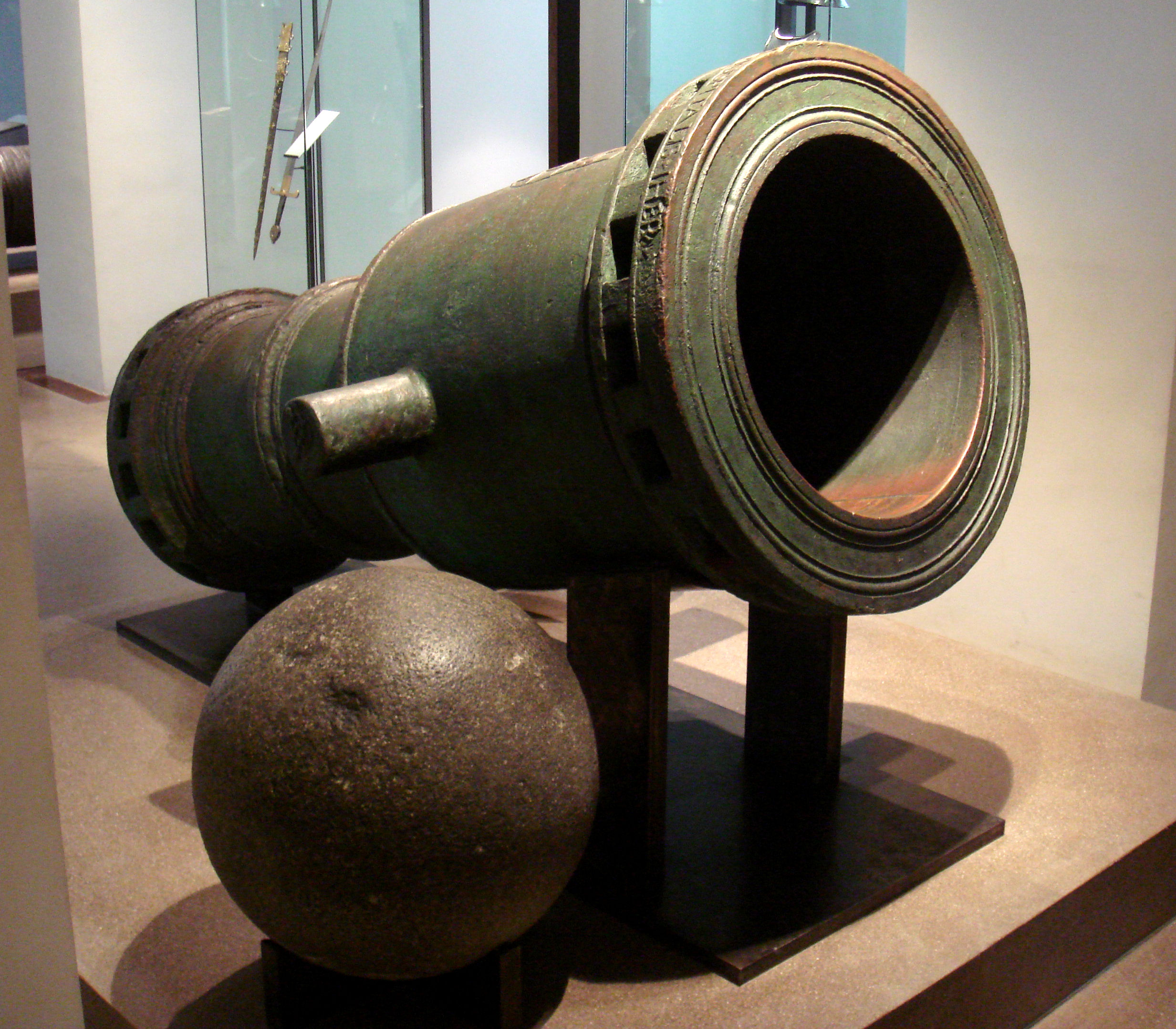
Bombard-mortar of the Knights of Saint John, Rhodes, 1480–1500. Founded at the request of Pierre d'Aubusson, the bombard was used for close defence of the walls (100–200 metres). It fired 260 kg granite balls. The bombard weighs 3,325 kg. Musée de l'Armée.

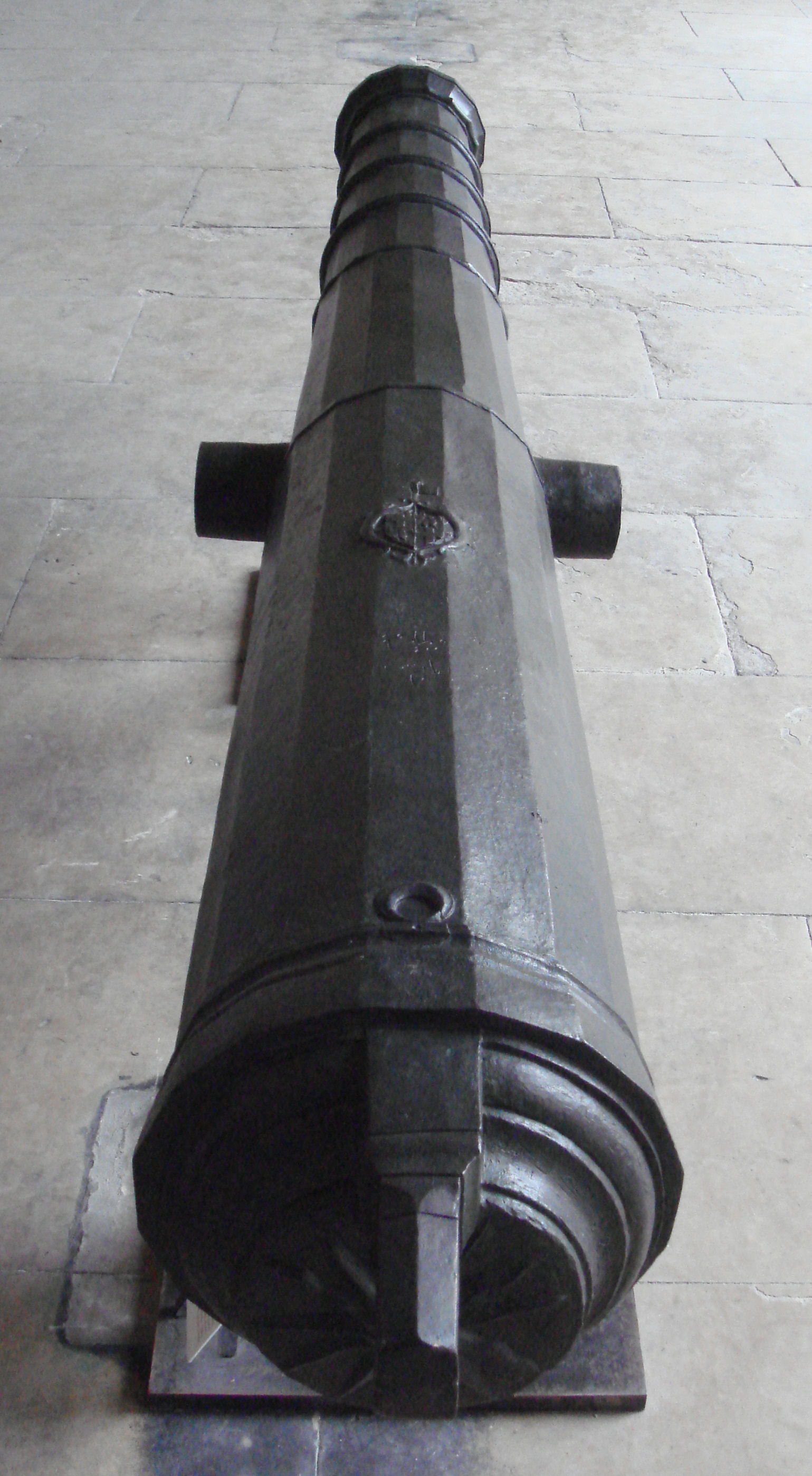
Culverin with the arms of Philippe Villiers de L'Isle-Adam, Rhodes. Caliber: 140 millimetres (5.5 in), length: 339 centimetres (133 in), weight: 2,533 kilograms (5,584 lb), ammunition: 10 kilograms (22 lb) iron ball. Remitted by Abdülaziz to Napoleon III in 1862.

== See also ==
- List of campaigns of Suleiman the Magnificent

== Bibliography ==
- Clodfelter, M. (2017). Warfare and Armed Conflicts: A Statistical Encyclopedia of Casualty and Other Figures, 1492–2015 (4th ed.). McFarland. ISBN 978-0786474707.
- Brockman, Eric (1969), The two sieges of Rhodes, 1480–1522, (London:) Murray, OCLC 251851470
- Kollias, Ēlias (1991), The Knights of Rhodes : the palace and the city, Travel guides (Ekdotikē Athēnōn), Ekdotike Athenon, ISBN 978-960-213-251-7, OCLC 34681208
- Reston, James Jr., Defenders of the Faith: Charles V, Suleyman the Magnificent, and the Battle for Europe, 1520–36 (New York: Penguin, 2009).
- Smith, Robert Douglas and DeVries, Kelly (2011), Rhodes Besieged. A new history, Stroud: The History Press, ISBN 978-0-7524-6178-6
- Vatin, Nicolas (1994), L' ordre de Saint-Jean-de-Jérusalem, l'Empire ottoman et la Méditerranée orientale entre les deux sièges de Rhodes : (1480–1522), Collection Turcica, 7 (in French), Peeters, ISBN 978-90-6831-632-2
- Weir, William, 50 Battles That Changed the World: The Conflicts That Most Influenced the Course of History, The Career Press, 2001. pp. 161–169. ISBN 1-56414-491-7
