= Fort St. Angelo =

Bastioned fort in Birgu, Malta

- Forti Sant'Anġlu (Maltese)
- Part of the fortifications of Birgu
- Birgu, Malta
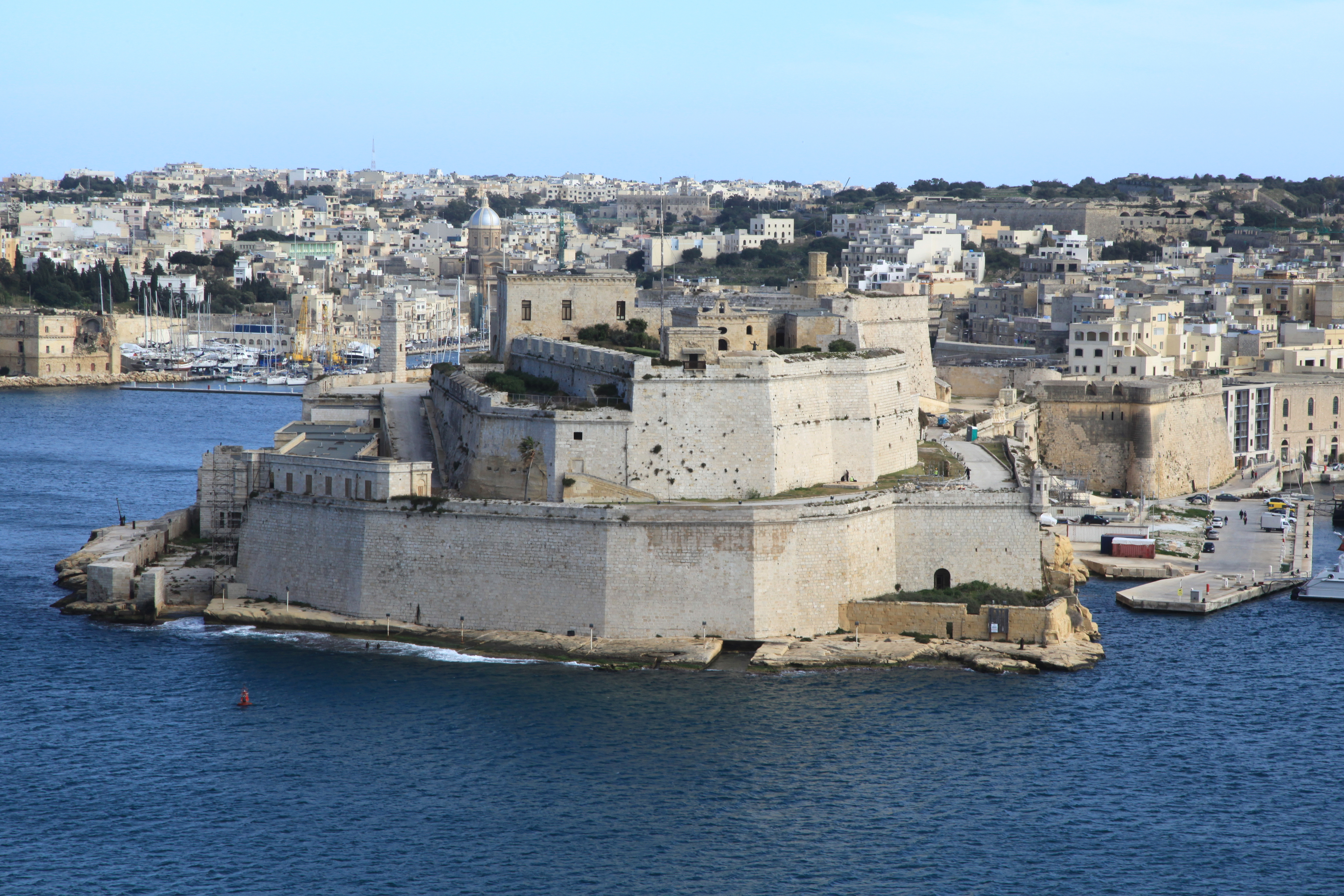
- Fort St. Angelo as seen from the Upper Barrakka Gardens

Site information
- Type: Bastioned fort; previously a castle
- Owner: Government of Malta
- Controlled by: Cottonera Waterfront Group; Heritage Malta; Sovereign Military Order of Malta
- Open to the public: Most of fort, partially on occasions
- Condition: Intact

Location
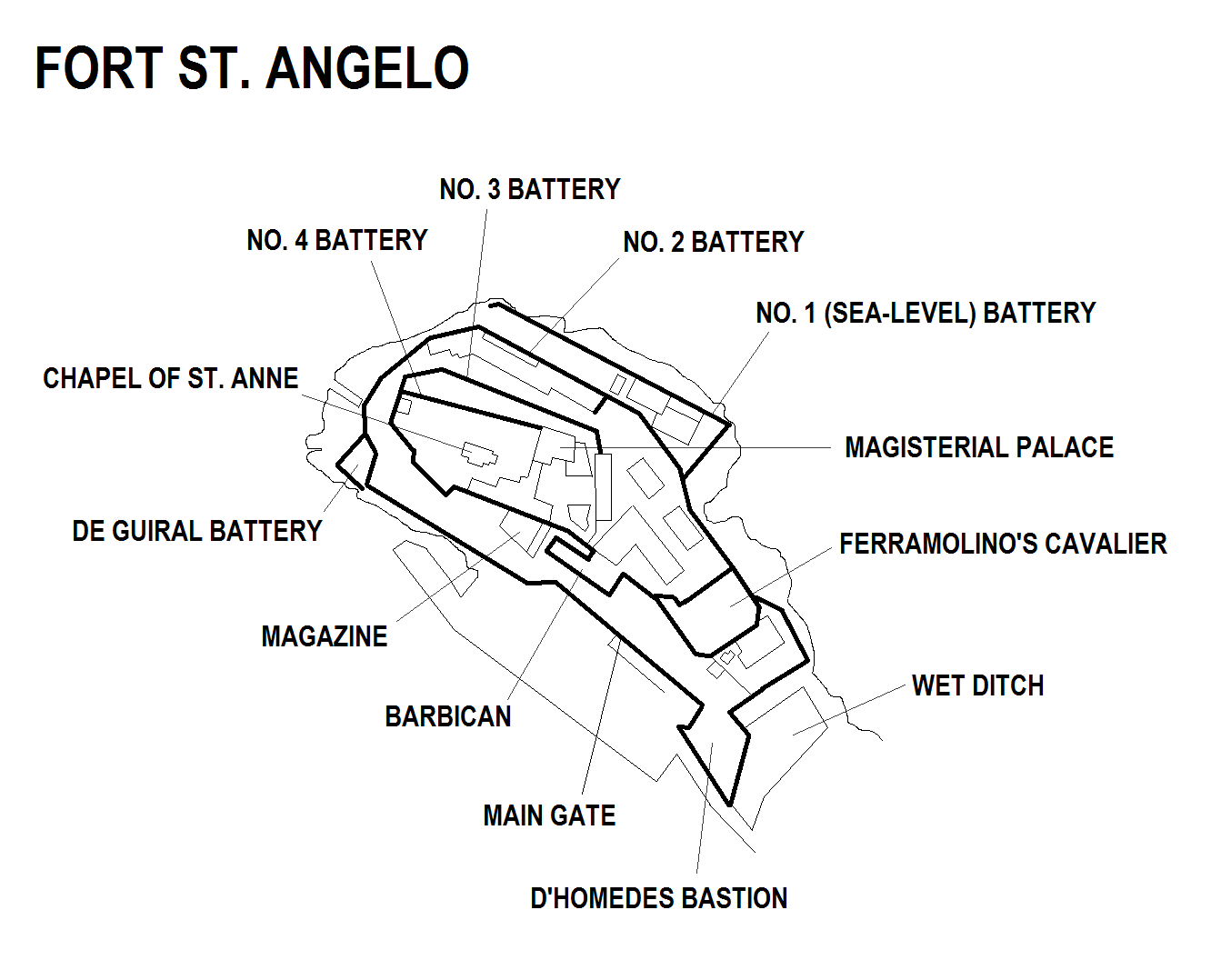
- Map of Fort St. Angelo
- Coordinates: 35°53′31″N 14°31′6″E
- Area: 13,000 m^{2} (140,000 sq ft)

Site history
- Built: c. 13th century–1691
- Built by: Order of Saint John
- In use: c. 13th century–1979
- Materials: Limestone
- Battles/wars: Battle of Malta; Attack of 1551; Great Siege of Malta; Siege of Malta (1798–1800); Siege of Malta (World War II)

Garrison information
- Garrison: 450

Fort St. Angelo (Maltese: Forti Sant'Anġlu or Fortizza Sant'Anġlu) is a bastioned fort in Birgu, Malta, located at the centre of the Grand Harbour. It was originally built in the medieval period as a castle called the Castrum Maris (English: Castle by the Sea; Italian: Castello al Mare). It was rebuilt by the Order of Saint John as a bastioned fort called Fort Saint Angelo between the 1530s and the 1560s, and it is best known for its role as the Order's headquarters during the Great Siege of Malta of 1565. A major reconstruction to designs of Carlos de Grunenbergh took place in the 1690s, giving the fort its current appearance.

The fort was garrisoned by the British from 1800 to 1979, at times being classified as a stone frigate known as HMS Egmont or later HMS St Angelo. The fort suffered considerable damage during World War II, but it was later restored. In 1998, the upper part of the fort was handed to the Sovereign Military Order of Malta. Fort St. Angelo has been on Malta's tentative list of UNESCO World Heritage Sites since 1998, as part of the Knights' Fortifications around the Harbours of Malta.

== History ==
=== Pre-history to antiquity ===
The site was occupied since pre-history and a prominent place of worship in antiquity with the building of the temple of Astarte.

The date of its original construction is unknown. However, the prehistoric and classical remains on site, are indicative of a fortified place and a habitable zone. Large ashlar blocks and an Egyptian pink granite column at the top part of the fort still exists inside the chapel. The site was probably later developed by the Arabs c. 870 AD, but nothing is concrete. Al-Himyarī mentions that the Arabs dismantled a حصن (ḥiṣn, 'fortress'), but there is no actual reference if this 'fortress' was in Birgu. A rock-cut church close to the area had already existed since Orthodox Christianity in Malta around 600 A.D. and was rebuilt with wood in around 800 A.D.

=== Middle Ages ===
Its probable start as a fortification is the high/late medieval period. In fact, in 1220 Hohenstaufen Emperor Frederick II started to appoint his own Castellani for Malta who needed a place to live and secure the interests of the crown. The remains of a tower that may date back to the 12th century can be traced among the more recent works. The first mention of Castrum Maris ("Castle by the sea") is to be found in documents from the 1240s when Paulinus of Malta was the lord of the island and later when Giliberto Abate made a census of the islands. Another reference to the castle is that from the short Angevin rule (1266–83) where documents list it again as Castrum Maris and list a garrison of 150 men together with several weapons. It seems also that by 1274, the castle already had two chapels which are still there today. A detailed inventory of weapons and supplies in the castle exists from the same year. From 1283 the Maltese islands were under Aragonese rule (although the castle remained for some time in Angevin rule while the rest of Malta was already in Aragonese hands) and the fortification was mainly used by Castellani (like the de Nava family) who were there to safeguard the interests of the Aragonese crown. In fact the Castellans did not have any jurisdiction outside the ditch of the fort.

By 1445 a Mariam confraternity, one of the eldest in Maltese history, had its convent located at the site. A middle-ages window was discovered during renovations. It is documented that this had been walled up soon after the arrival of the knights.

=== Knights' period ===
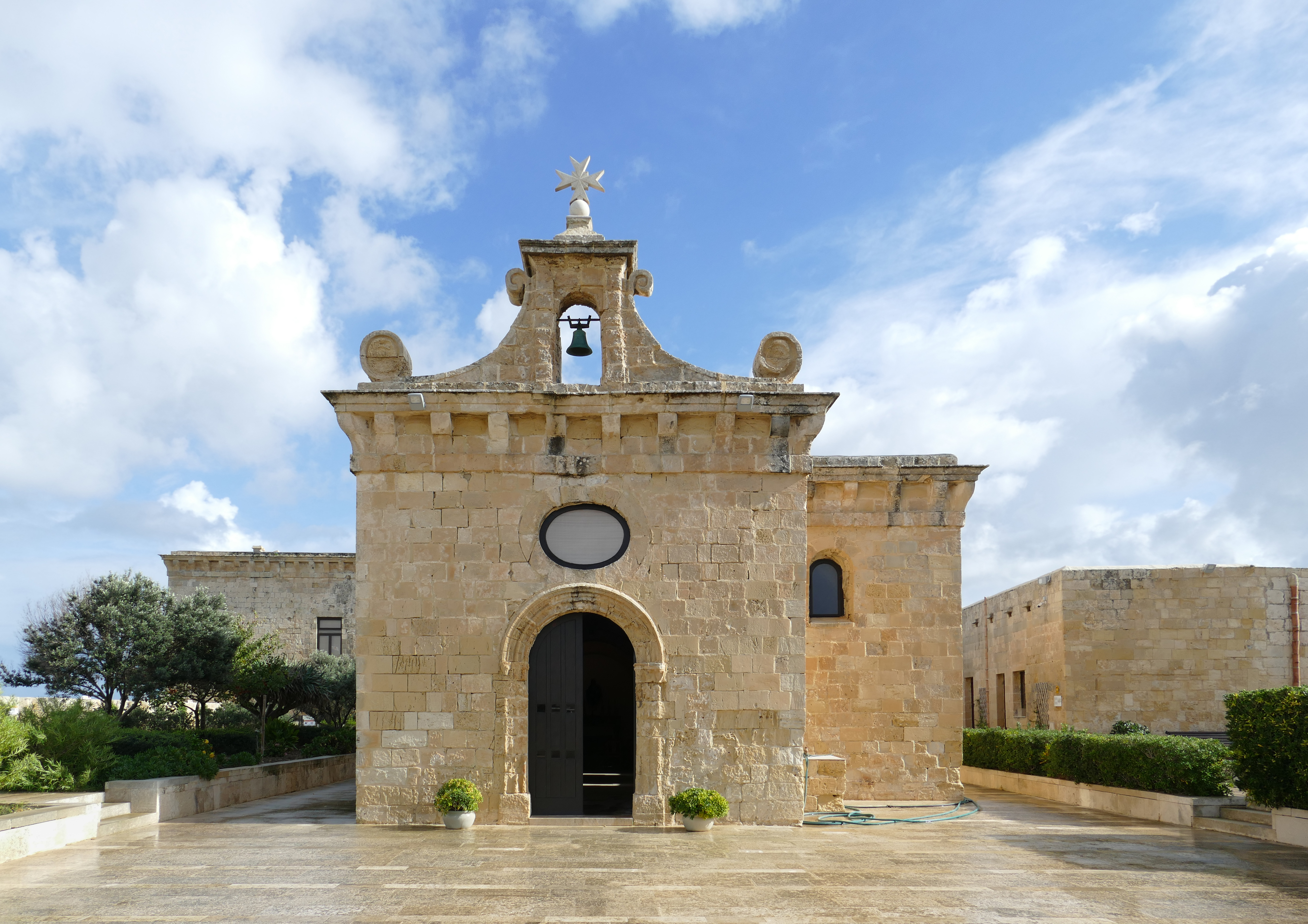
St. Anne's Chapel

When the Order of Saint John arrived in Malta in 1530, they chose to settle in Birgu, when it was observed the site of Fort St Angelo was partially abandoned and in ruins. After renovation it became the seat of the Grand Master, which included the refurbishing of the Castellan's House and the Chapel of St Anne. The Knights made this their primary fortification and substantially reinforced and remodelled it, including the cutting of the dry ditch to make it a moat and the D'Homedes Bastion built by 1536. By 1547, a large cavalier designed by Antonio Ferramolino was built behind the D'Homedes Bastion, and De Guirial Battery was built at the tip of the fort by sea level to protect the entrance to Dockyard Creek. These works transformed the fort into a gunpowder fortification. Fort St Angelo withstood the Turks during the Great Siege of Malta, during which it succeeded in repulsing a sea attack by the Turks on Senglea on 15 August 1565. In the aftermath of that siege, the Knights built the fortified city of Valletta on Mount Sciberras on the opposite side of the Grand Harbour, and the administrative centre for the knights moved there.

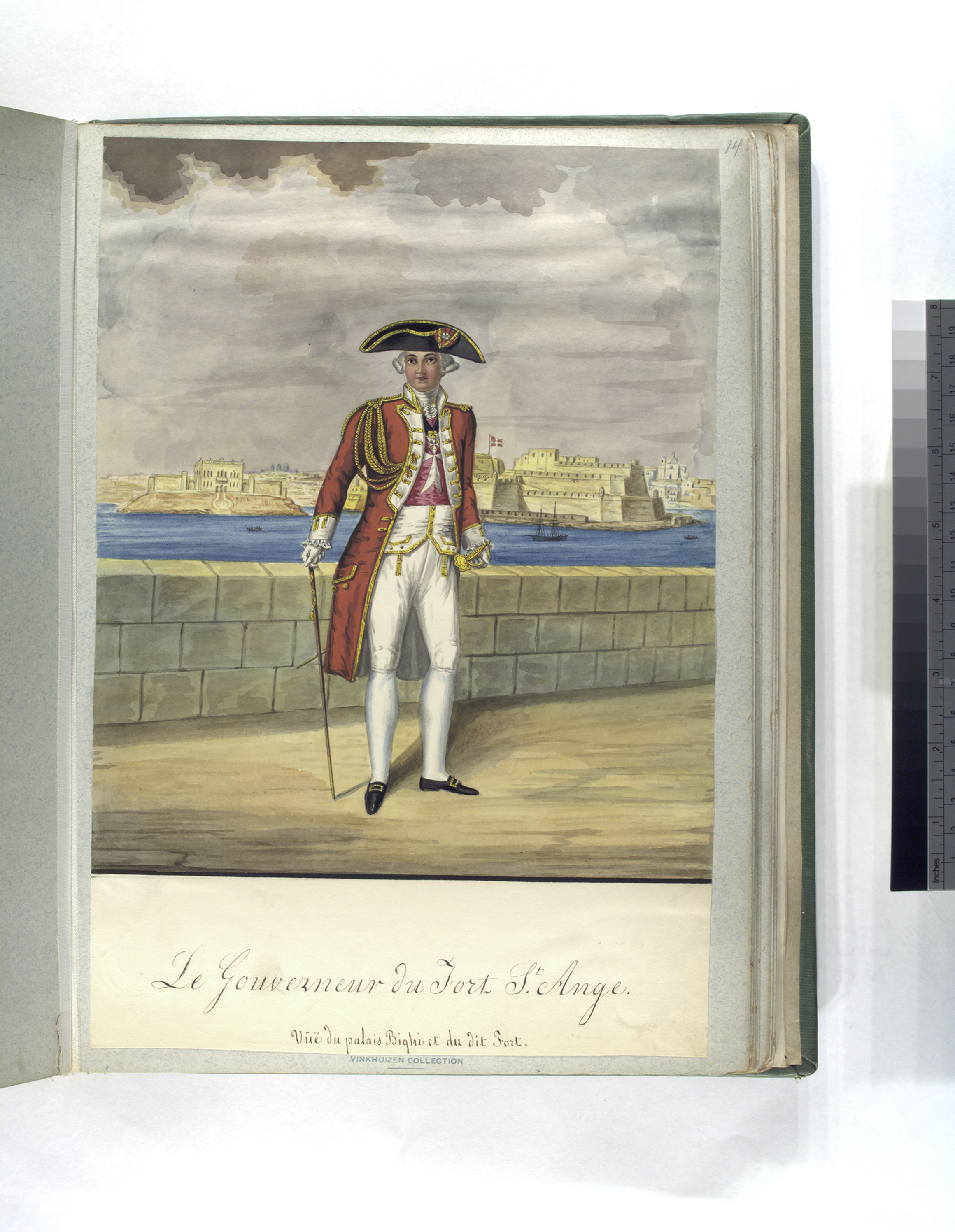
18th century painting of the Hospitaller Governor of Fort St Angelo, with the fort itself in the background

In 1644, Giovanni de’ Medici proposed that a new fort be constructed on Orsi Point (the site where Fort Ricasoli was later built), and the name and garrison of Fort St. Angelo be transferred to the new fort. He drew up plans for the proposed fort, but they were never implemented.

In the 1690s the fort again underwent major repairs. Today's layout of the fort is attributed to these works which were designed by Carlos de Grunenbergh, who also paid for the construction of four gun batteries on the side of the fort facing the entrance to Grand Harbour. As a result, one can still see his coat of arms above the main gate of the fort. When the French arrived in 1798, the fort had become a powerful fortification housing some 80 guns, 48 of which pointed towards the entrance of the port. During the short two-year period of French occupation, the Fort served as the headquarters of the French Army.

=== British period ===
With the coming of the British to Malta the fort retained its importance as a military installation, first in use by the Army as a Wireless Station. In fact, in 1800, two battalions of the 35th Regiment were resident in the fort. However, at the start of the 20th century, the fort was taken over by the Navy and it was commissioned as a stone frigate, originally in 1912 as HMS Egmont, when it became a base for the Royal Navy in the Mediterranean and in 1933 renamed as HMS St Angelo. The British did not make any major modifications to the fort, although they converted No. 2 Battery into a casemated battery for three nine-inch RML guns in the 1860s, and built a cinema and a water distillation plant in the early 20th century.

During World War II, the fort again withstood the siege with an armament of 3 Bofors guns (manned by the Royal Marines and later by the Royal Malta Artillery). In total, the fort suffered 69 direct hits between 1940 and 1943. When the Royal Navy left Malta in 1979 the Fort was handed to the Maltese government and since then parts of the fort fell into a state of disrepair, mostly after a failed project to transform it into a hotel during the 1980s.

=== Recent history ===
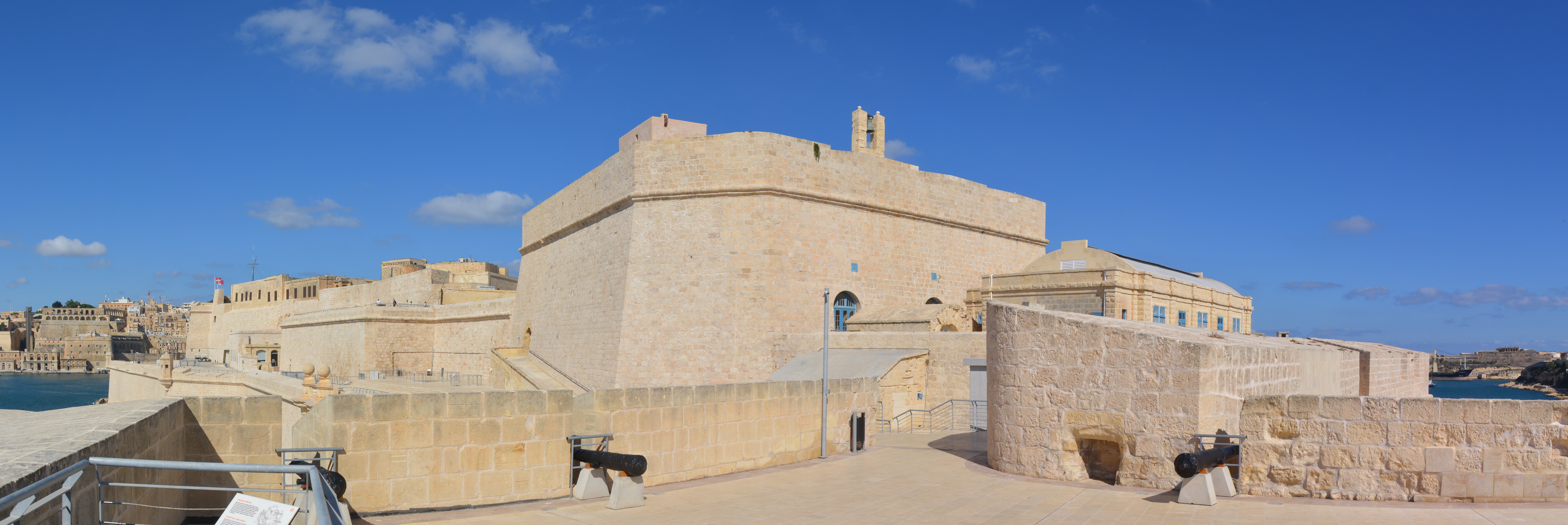
Panoramic view of the fort from D'Homedes Bastion after restoration

On 5 December 1998, a treaty was signed between Malta and the Sovereign Military Order of Malta granting the upper part of Fort St Angelo, including the Grand Master's House and the Chapel of St Anne, to the Order with limited extraterritoriality.

This treaty was ratified on 1 November 2001. The agreement has a duration of 99 years but the document allows the Maltese Government to terminate it at any time after 50 years. In terms of the agreement, the flag of Malta is to be flown together with the flag of the Order in a prominent position over Saint Angelo. No asylum may be granted by the Order and generally the Maltese courts have full jurisdiction and Maltese law shall apply. A number of immunities and privileges are mentioned in the second bilateral treaty.

Other parts of the fort are leased to the Cottonera Waterfront Group, a private consortium.

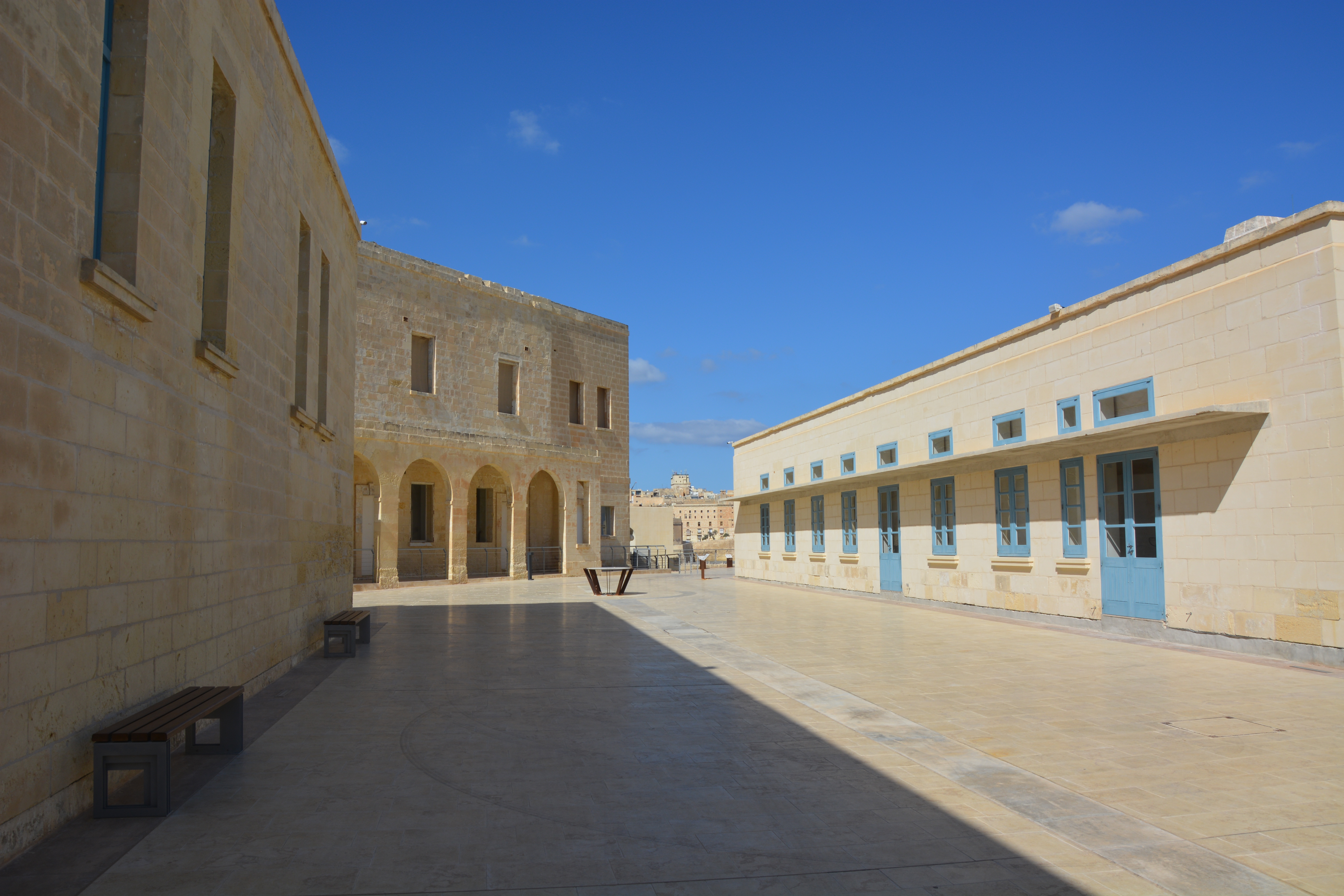
Interior of the fort after restoration

On 5 March 2012, it was confirmed that the European Regional Development Fund allocated €13.4 million for the restoration, conservation and re-use of the site, allowing for the Fort to be opened as a major visitor attraction highlighting its history and roles through the ages as well as to cater for educational programs, cultural events and live historical experiences. The restoration was managed by Heritage Malta. and completed in September 2015. It frequently participates in hosting events of national importance including the Commonwealth Heads of Government Meeting 2015 and the 2017 Maltese EU presidency.

== Layout ==
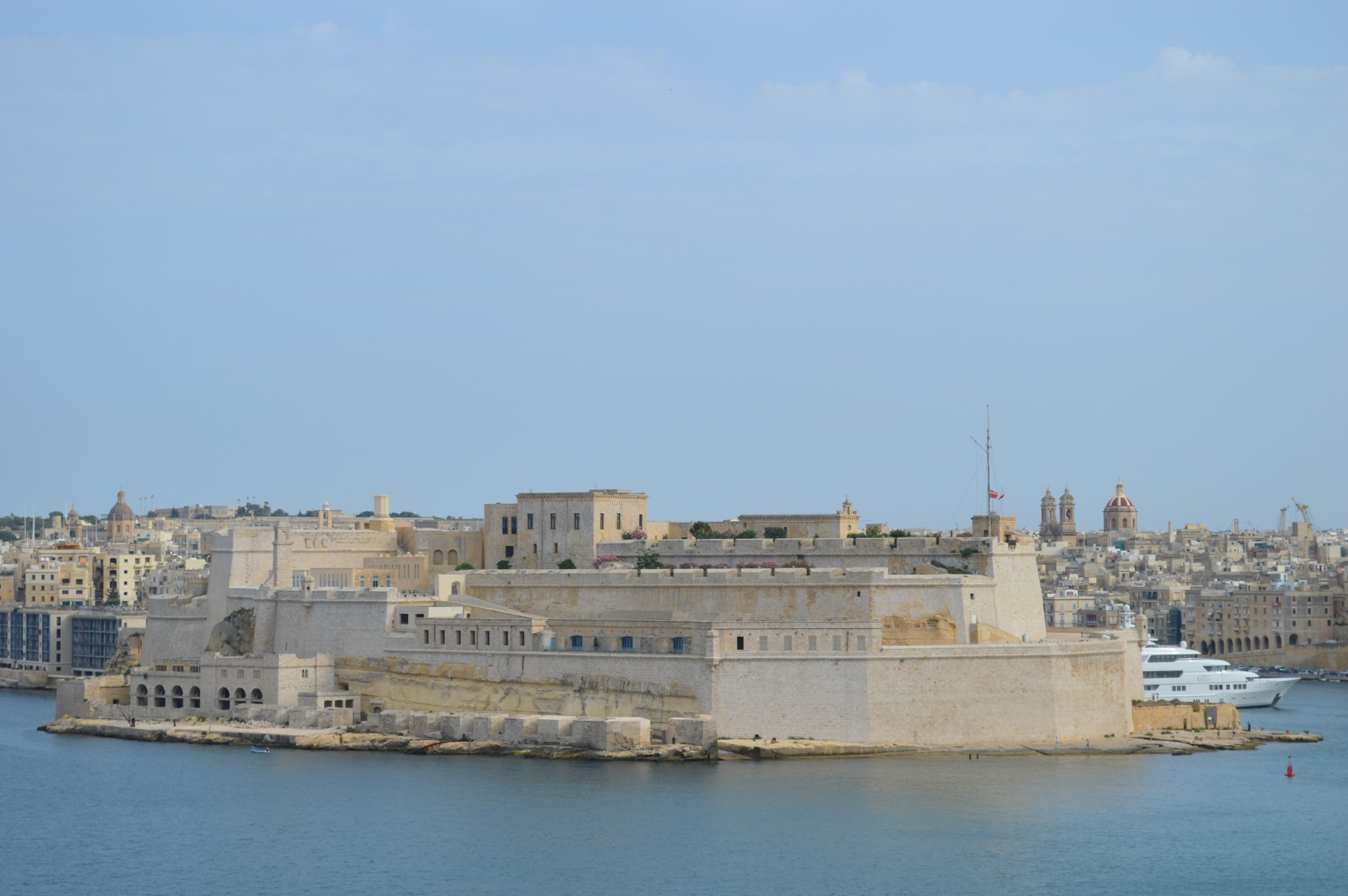
View of Fort St. Angelo, with the four batteries constructed by Grunenburgh visible to the left.

Upon the arrival of the Order in 1530, the Castrum Maris consisted of a shell keep containing various buildings, including the Castellan's house and the Chapel of St. Mary (later rededicated to St. Anne), and an outer ward. The castle also included a chapel dedicated to St. Angelo, which was later rededicated to the Nativity of Our Lady.

By the time of the Great Siege of Malta of 1565, the fort still retained most of its medieval features, but a number of modifications had been made by the Order, including:

- D'Homedes Bastion – built during the reign of Juan de Homedes y Coscon. It was heavily altered since the 16th century, especially when it was converted into a gunpowder magazine. Part of the bastion was destroyed in World War II, but the damage was repaired in the 1990s.
- Ferramolino's Cavalier – a high cavalier near D'Homedes Bastion, built between 1542 and 1547. Its roof had eight embrasures, and several magazines and a beacon were also located on the cavalier.
- De Guiral Battery – a small sea-level battery on the western side of the fort at the waterline. It was named after the Chevalier Francesco de Guiral, its commander during the Great Siege. The battery was altered in the 17th and 18th centuries, again by the British.

Most of the present configuration of the fort dates back to reconstruction in the 1690s. Among the features added by Grunenbergh were four batteries facing the entrance to the Grand Harbour. No. 1, No. 2 and No. 4 Batteries were heavily altered by the British, while No. 3 Battery retains more of its original features.

== Gallery ==
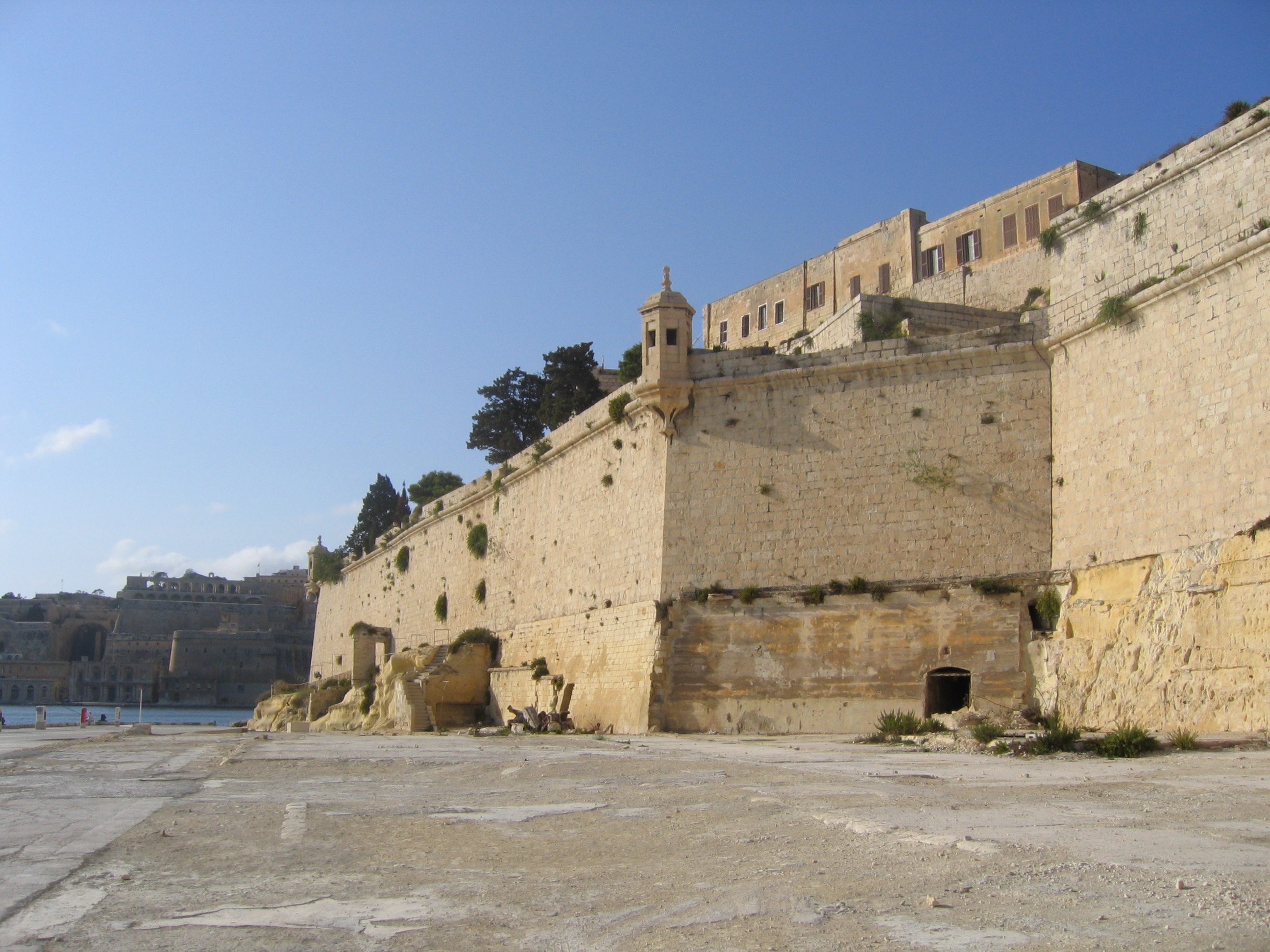
West face of the seaward bastion

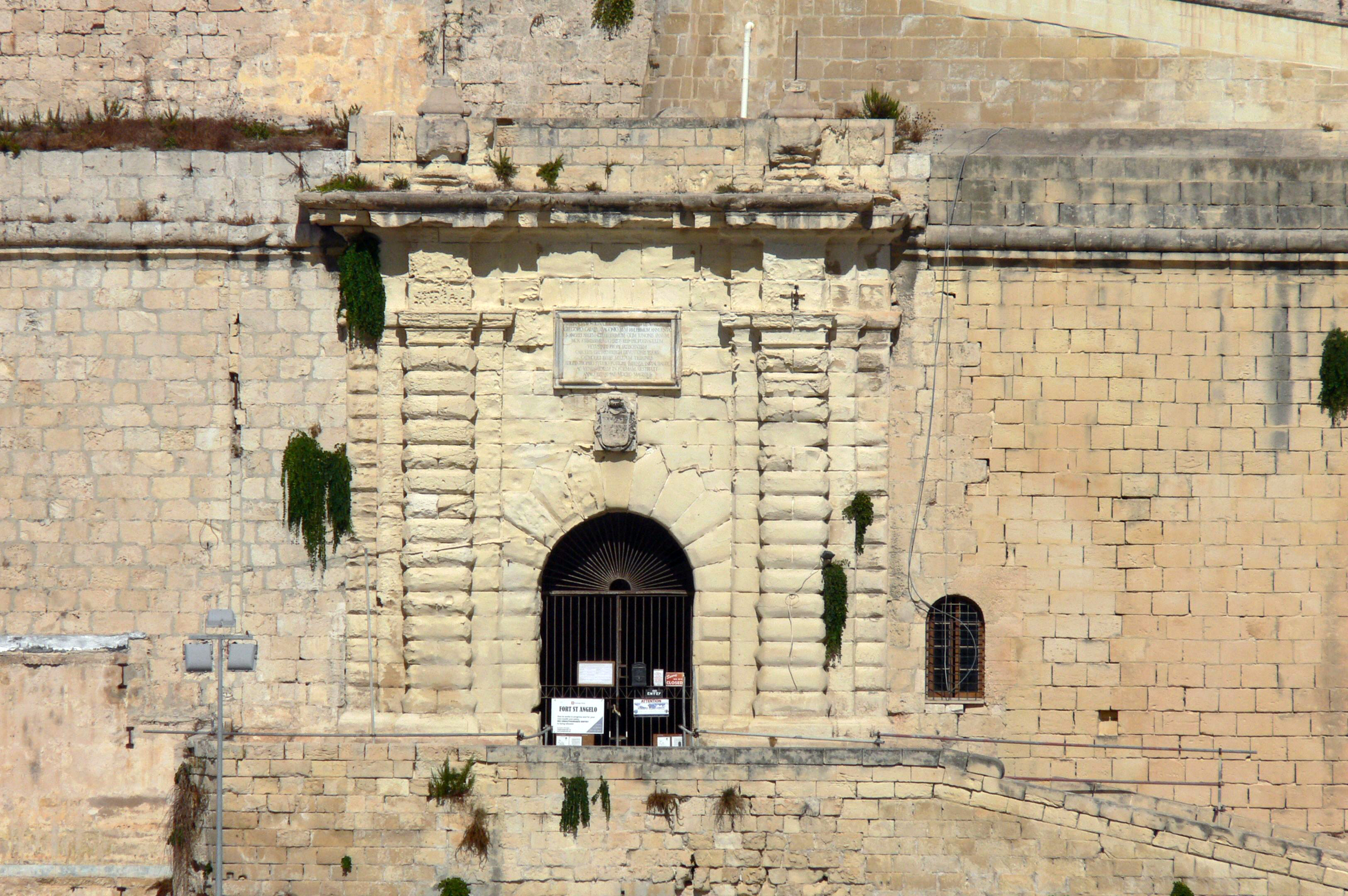
Main Gate before renovation

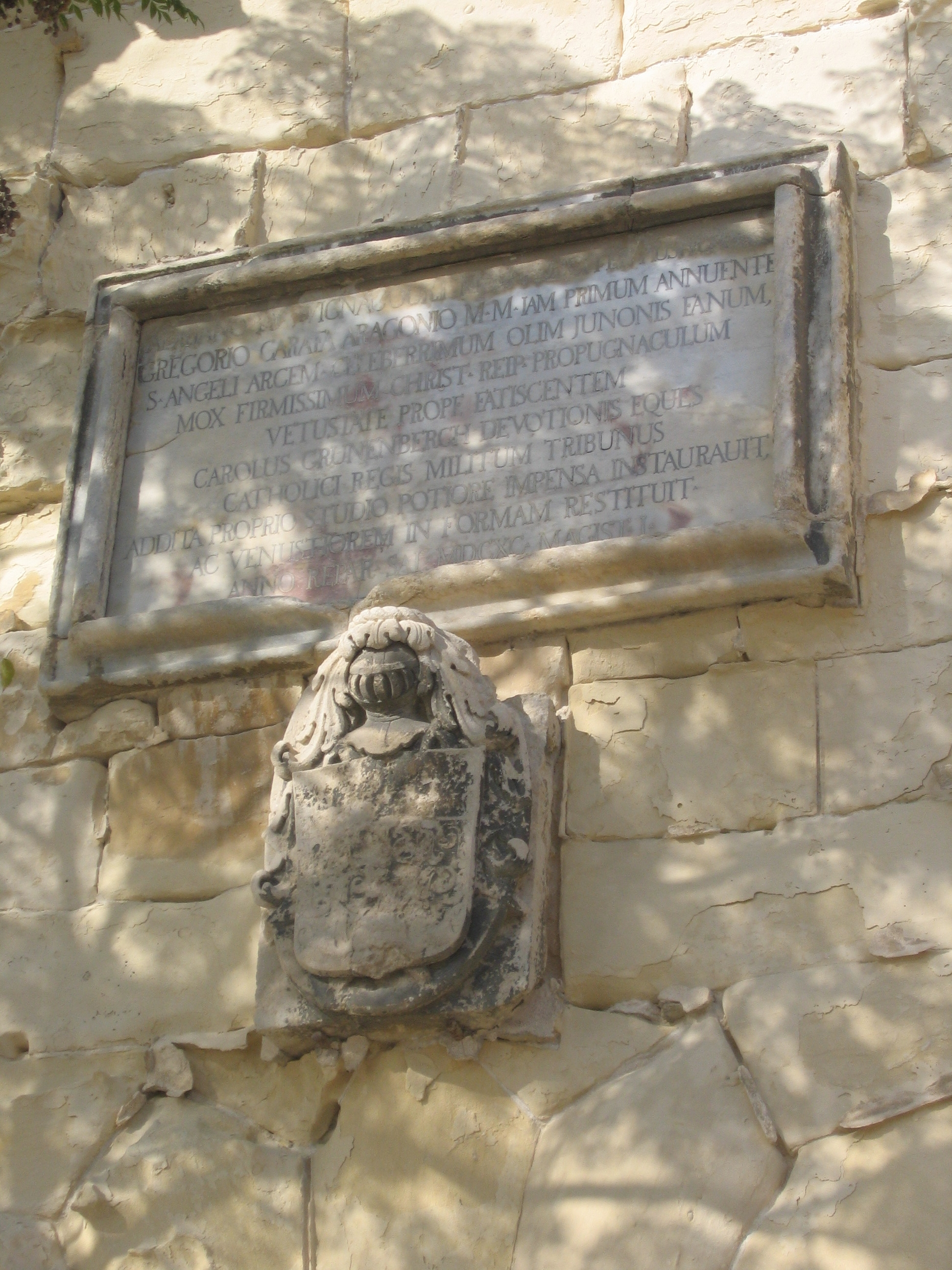
Inscription over the gate

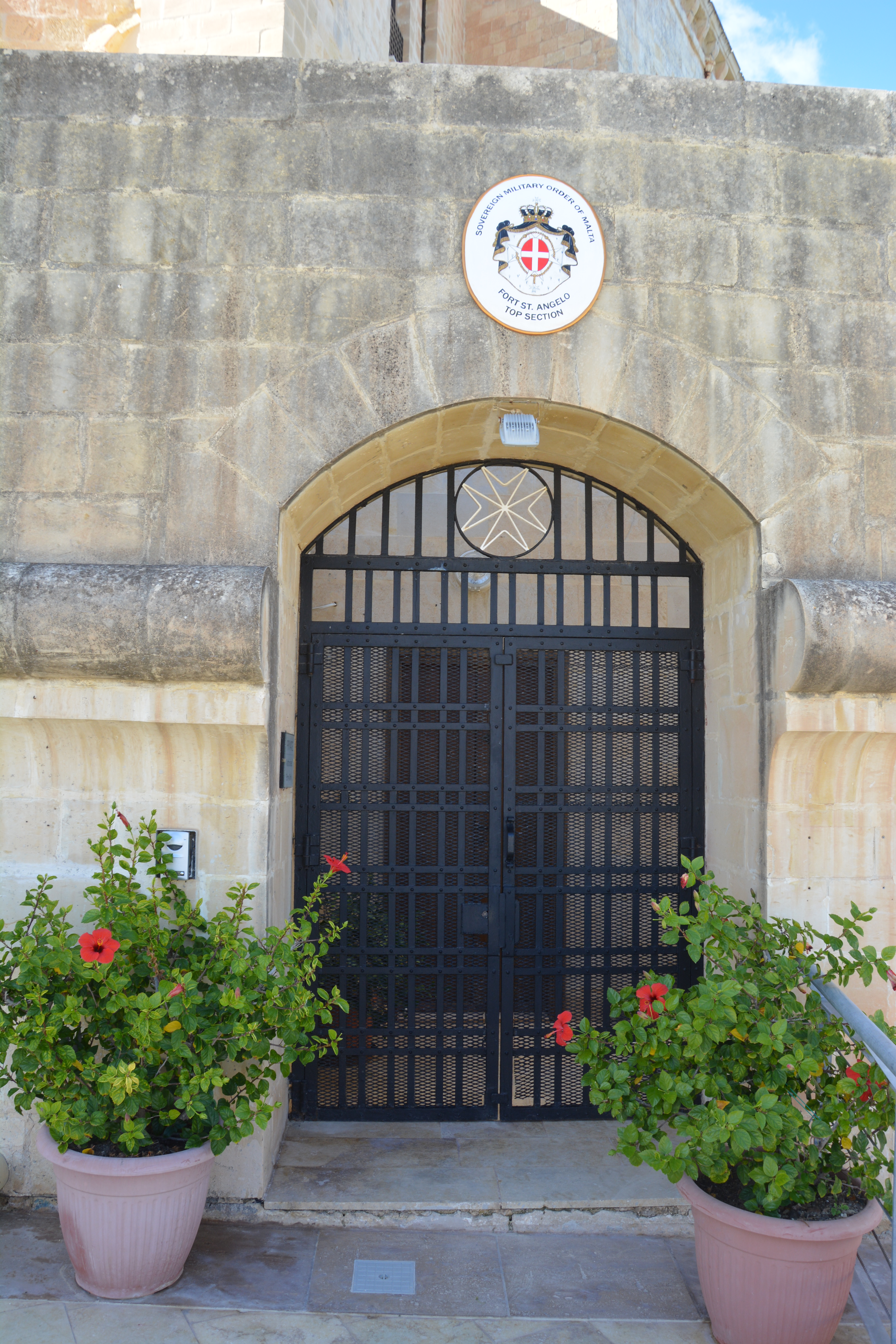
Private part of the fort dedicated to the SMOM

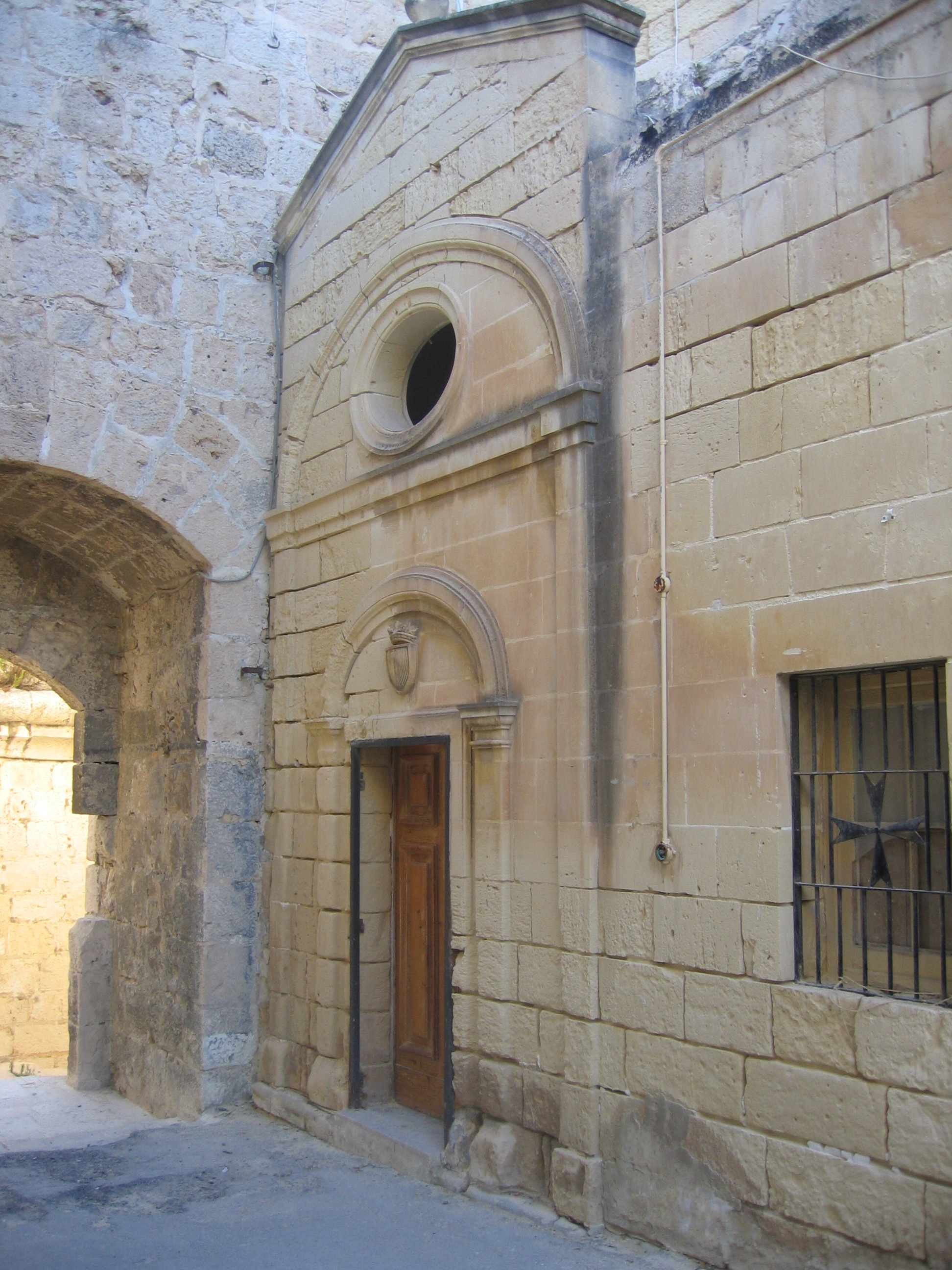
Chapel of the Nativity of Our Lady

== Other buildings and art ==
- Treasures of the Knights
