= Hospitaller Tripoli =

Rule under the Knights Hospitaller, 1530–1551

Tripoli Tripolis طرابلس
- 1530–1551
- Flag Coat of arms

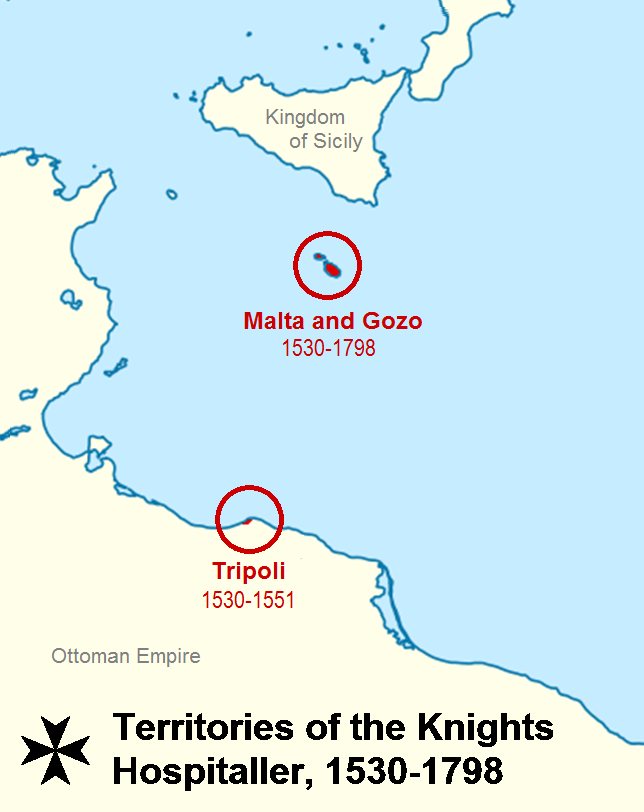
- Map of Hospitaller Tripoli in relation to Hospitaller Malta

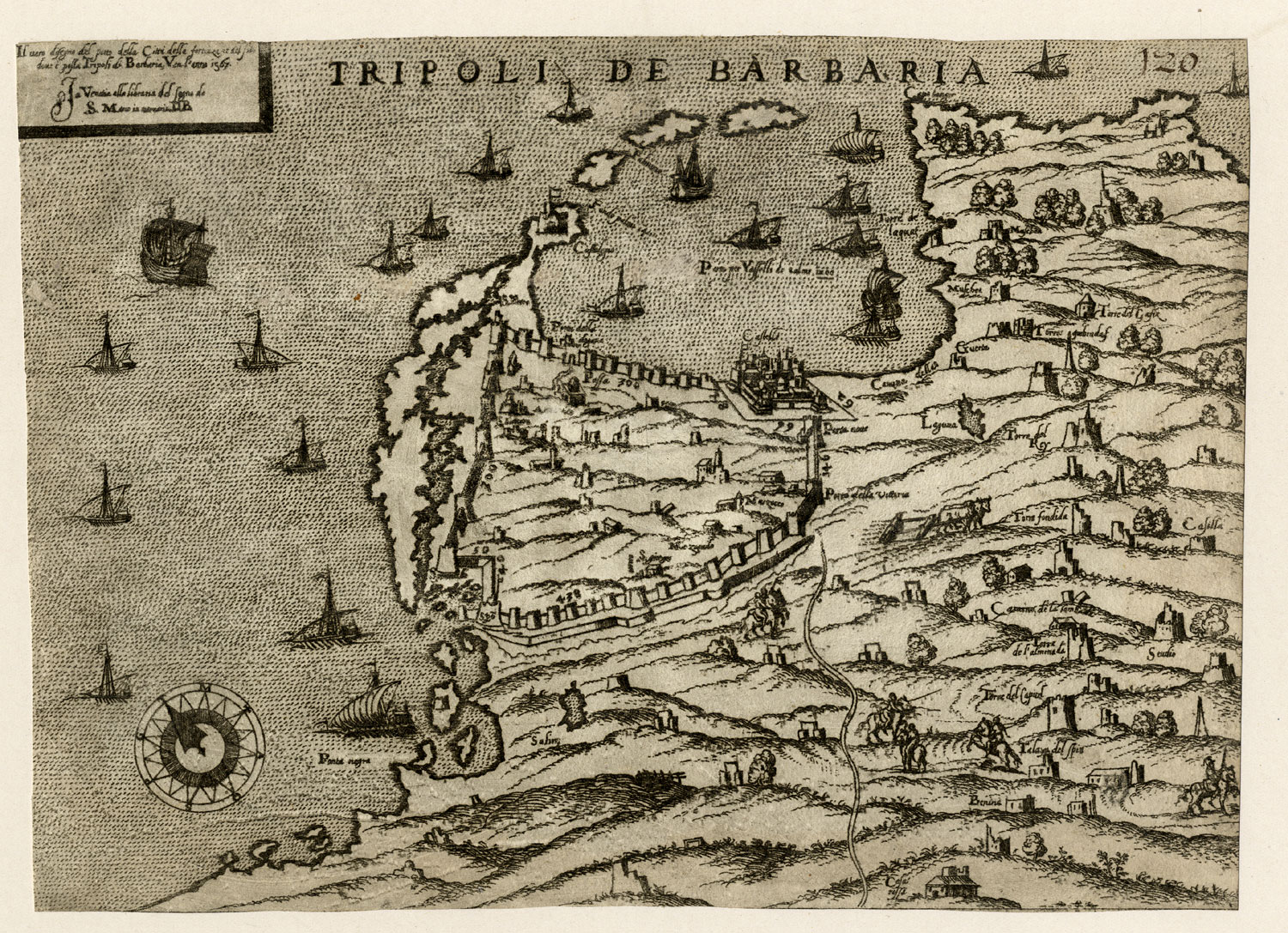
- Map of Tripoli dated 1561, shortly after the end of Hospitaller rule
- Status: Vassal of the Kingdom of Sicily
- Capital: Tripoli
- Religion: Roman Catholicism
- Governor
  - 1530–1531: Gaspare de Sanguessa (first)
  - 1551: Gaspard de Vallier (last)
- Historical era: Early modern period
  - Hospitaller fief: 23 March 1530
  - Established: 25 July 1530
  - Ottoman conquest: 15 August 1551
Preceded by	Succeeded by
Spanish Tripoli	Ottoman Tripolitania
- Today part of: Libya

Tripoli, today the capital city of Libya, was ruled by the Knights Hospitaller between 1530 and 1551. The city had been under Spanish rule for two decades before it was granted as a fief to the Hospitallers in 1530 along with the islands of Malta and Gozo. The Hospitallers found it difficult to control both the city and the islands, and at times they proposed to either move their headquarters to Tripoli or to abandon and raze the city. Hospitaller rule over Tripoli ended in 1551 when the city was captured by the Ottoman Empire following a siege.

== History ==
During an Ottoman siege in 1522, the Knights Hospitaller were expelled from Rhodes, which had been their base since the early 14th century. They subsequently entered negotiations with Spanish Emperor Charles V who offered them Tripoli and the islands of Malta and Gozo as their new base. Tripoli had been under Spanish rule since its capture in 1510. A delegation sent by the Hospitallers produced a report which stated that these locations were unfavourable, and they were reluctant to accept both Tripoli and the Maltese Islands because of the distance between them and the considerable expenses that would be necessary to maintain them.

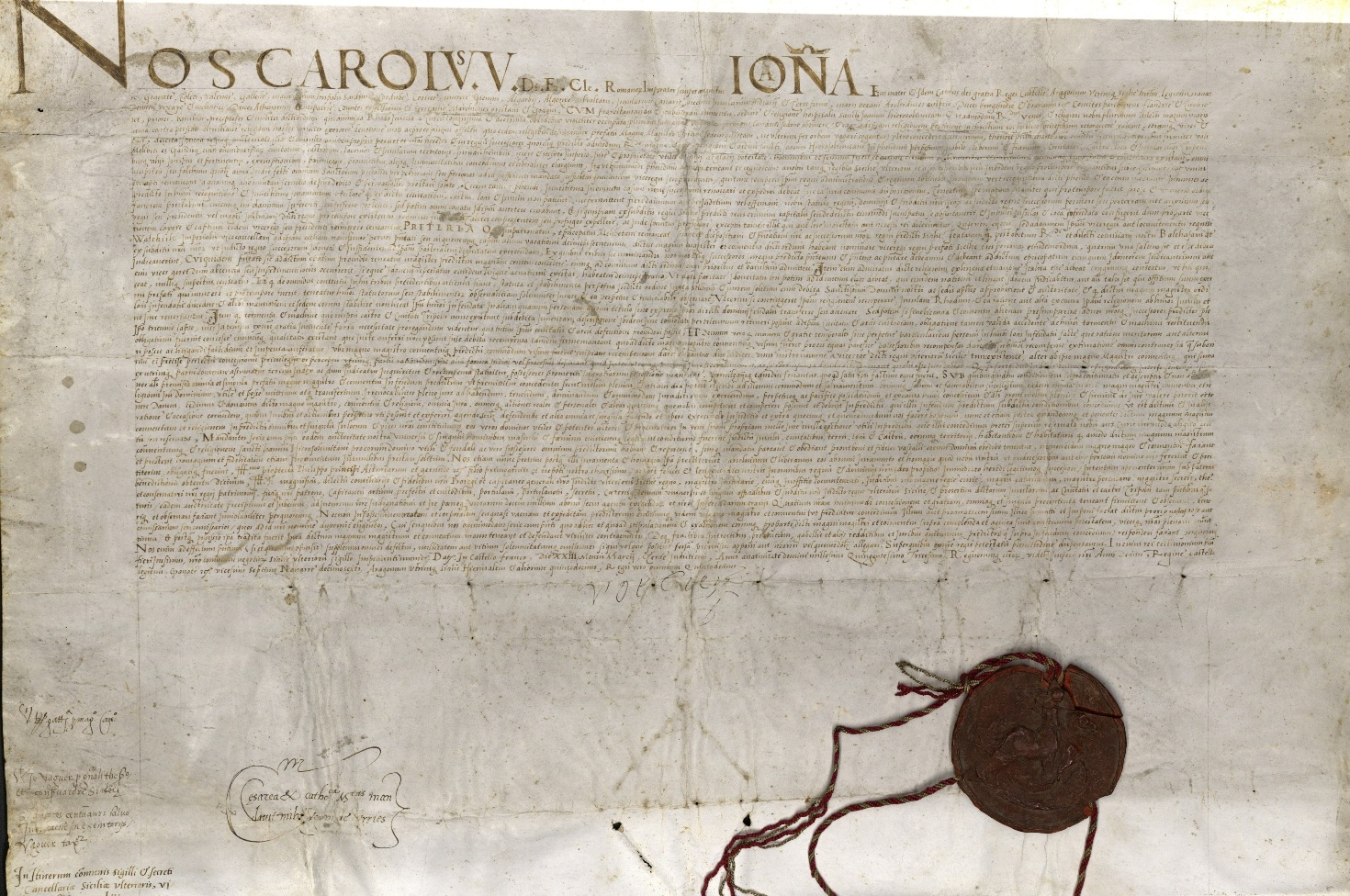
The 1530 bull by which Tripoli, Malta and Gozo were granted to the Hospitallers, now preserved at the National Library of Malta

The Hospitallers eventually accepted Tripoli, Malta and Gozo as a fief on 23 March 1530, and they took control of the city on 25 July. The Order established its headquarters at Birgu on Malta, while a Governor was appointed to administer Tripoli. The first Hospitaller Governor was Gaspare de Sanguessa, and although he attempted to establish friendly relations with nearby tribes, resistance to Christian rule continued from the nearby settlement of Tajura which was under Ottoman influence. The Florentine military engineer Piccino was sent to Tripoli to design modifications to the city's fortifications in the early 1530s.

At one point, Tajura's ruler Aydın Reis built a fortress known as the el-Cadi tower about 1 mile (1.6 km) outside the walls of Tripoli, but this was captured and destroyed by Hospitaller forces led by Governor Georg Schilling von Cannstatt. The knight Paul Simeoni was sent to Tripoli in March 1539 to draw up a report on the state of the city, and when he returned to Malta in June he reported that there were daily skirmishes between the Hospitallers of Tripoli and the forces of Tajura. The Hospitallers lacked the funds to make the necessary upgrades to the city's fortifications, and at times they proposed to abandon the city, demolish its castle and block its harbour.

By the mid-1540s, the Ottoman threat to Tripoli decreased as a truce was signed between Ottoman Sultan Suleiman and Charles V. Jean de Valette was appointed as Governor of Tripoli in 1546, and he reformed the city's government and improved its fortifications. He made a proposal that the Order should transfer its headquarters from Malta to the city, retaining the islands only as an outpost. A compromise was reached in which Malta remained the Hospitallers' main base, but efforts to establish a Hospitaller presence in Tripoli increased with more knights being sent to the city. The Governor of Tripoli was given powers similar to those of the Order's Grand Master, and he could establish auberges for the Order's eight langues within the city. Valette hoped that the Hospitallers could eventually gain control of the entire region of Tripolitania. The Order's plans to move to Tripoli ceased after the galley La Catarinetta which had been carrying 7,000 scudi intended to pay for the city's new fortifications was captured by the Turkish corsair Dragut.

In early 1551, Suleiman ordered Sinan Pasha to capture Tripoli from the Hospitallers. Following a failed attempt to take Malta and a successful attack on Gozo, the Ottomans besieged Tripoli for two weeks. The city surrendered on 14 August, and Governor Gaspard de Vallier and the knights were allowed to leave on vessels provided by the French ambassador. Part of the city's garrison was also allowed to leave, while the rest were enslaved. Muslim auxiliaries who had been in Hospitaller service were executed.

The Hospitallers made several attempts to recapture Tripoli, starting with a raid on Tripolitania in 1552. Dragut became the beylerbey of Tripoli in 1556, and he modified the city's fortifications such that it became one of the best-defended cities in Africa. De Valette, who became the Order's Grand Master in 1557, still hoped to retake the city and in 1559 an invasion force was assembled for this purpose but it was defeated in the Battle of Djerba in 1560. Tripoli remained under direct or indirect Ottoman rule until it was captured by Italy during the Italo-Turkish War in 1911.

== Government ==
Hospitaller Tripoli was administered by a Governor.

== Economy ==
After the Hospitallers took over Tripoli, the amount of trade which passed through the city declined while Tajura became a more important trading centre.

== Legacy ==
The Hospitallers' main church in Tripoli was incorporated into the Sidi Darghut Mosque in around 1560. Parts of the original building still survive although they have undergone major alterations.

== See also ==
- European enclaves in North Africa before 1830
- Hospitaller Rhodes
- Hospitaller Malta
- Red Castle of Tripoli
