= Siege of Tripoli (1551) =

1551 Ottoman siege and capture of Tripoli

Coordinates: 32°54′8″N 13°11′9″E

- Part of the Ottoman-Habsburg wars and the Italian War of 1551–1559
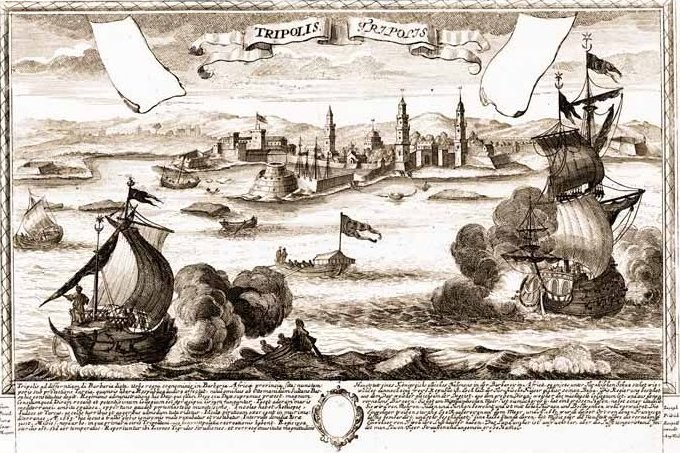
- Capture of Tripoli as illustrated in a 16th-century French engraving
Date	8–14 August 1551 (6 days)
Location	Tripoli (modern Libya)
Result	Ottoman–French victory
Territorial changes	Establishment of Ottoman Tripolitania

Belligerents
Ottoman Empire; France	(Sovereign Military Order of Malta) Hospitaller Tripoli

Commanders and leaders
Sinan Pasha; Dragut; Murad Agha (Kingdom of France) Gabriel de Luetz	(Sovereign Military Order of Malta) Gaspard de Vallier (surrendered)

Strength
c. 10,000–12,000 men 145 ships	c. 30–200 knights c. 500–630 men

Casualties and losses
Unknown	200 men executed Some enslaved

The siege of Tripoli was a successful Ottoman siege of the North African city of Tripoli, then held by the Knights Hospitaller, in August 1551. The attack, which was led by Sinan Pasha and Dragut, appears to have been launched in retaliation for the capture of Mahdia by the Spanish and Hospitallers the previous year.

The siege followed a brief Ottoman attack on the Kingdom of Sicily and Hospitaller Malta, during which the island of Gozo was invaded and sacked and some 5,000 to 7,000 inhabitants were taken as slaves. The Ottoman forces then sailed to North Africa, where local forces bolstered them from Tajura led by Murad Agha. Tripoli was besieged, and the city's governor Gaspard de Vallier capitulated after six days of bombardment.

Through the intervention of French ambassador Gabriel d'Aramont, the Hospitaller knights and part of the garrison were allowed to depart Tripoli for Malta, while the rest of the garrison was massacred or enslaved. Murad Agha was appointed as beylerbey of Tripoli, and he was later succeeded in this position by Dragut. The latter transformed Tripoli into a major base for the Barbary corsairs and consolidated Ottoman control over Tripolitania, which lasted until the 20th century.

== Background and prelude ==
Hospitaller Tripoli was a small city surrounded by a ring of packed earth fortifications, along with a fortress built partly of stone and partly of earth facing the sea, and a smaller fortress known as the castillegio guarding the mouth of the harbour. It had a small Christian garrison and some Arab Muslim residents; in the 1530s, this population stood at some 500 people.

The city had been ruled by the Knights Hospitaller since 1530, when it was granted to them by Spain along with the islands of Malta and Gozo. It had previously been under Spanish rule since its capture in 1510. The period of Hospitaller rule was characterised by near-constant conflict between the knights and the Ottoman Empire, and there were also frequent hostilities between the Hospitallers and Tajura, a town close to Tripoli whose population included descendants of those displaced by the 1510 invasion. In the 1540s, when Jean Parisot de Valette was Governor of Tripoli, the Order considered transferring its headquarters from Birgu on Malta to Tripoli. Ottoman sultan Suleiman might have been motivated to take Tripoli in order to thwart these plans.

In September 1550, the town of Mahdia in modern Tunisia – which Ottoman corsair Dragut had been using as a base – was captured by a Spanish-led expedition with Hospitaller support. This led the Ottoman sultanate to send a punitive expedition against Hospitaller Malta and Tripoli in 1551, with the capture of the latter being the primary objective.

Starting in May 1551, the Governor of Tripoli Gaspard de Vallier and several other Hospitaller knights, including Nicolas Durand de Villegaignon, informed Grand Master Juan de Homedes that a large Ottoman force was being assembled in Constantinople and that Malta and Tripoli were its targets. These rumours were dismissed by Spanish and Italian knights including Homedes, who believed that the intended destination of the Ottoman fleet was Toulon. The Grand Master reportedly believed that the Ottomans were going to rendezvous with the French fleet and attack Naples.

Despite this, some last-minute attempts were made to improve Tripoli's defences. With permission of the Viceroy of Sicily, the captain of the galleys of the Hospitaller fleet recruited a contingent of less than 200 Calabrians and Sicilians as mercenaries and sent them to Tripoli on 7 July 1551. Most of these were shepherds, vagabonds or convicts with no military training. Following instructions from the Order's Council, the women, children and invalids in Tripoli were evacuated to Malta, where they arrived on 13 July.

On that same day, the Ottoman fleet was sighted off Messina in Sicily. The Ottomans attacked the harbour of Augusta before landing on Malta on 18 July, where they briefly besieged Mdina but did not take the city. On 22 July, the Ottomans landed on Gozo and took the island's Castello on 26 July. Some 5,000 to 7,000 Gozitans, along with some Hospitaller knights, were captured and enslaved.

== Siege ==
The Ottoman fleet – which consisted of some 145 ships carrying 10,000 to 12,000 men along with the Gozitan captives – departed Gozo and began heading towards North Africa on 30 July 1551. They landed at Zuwarah and Tajura, which are respectively located west and east of Tripoli. The Gozitan captives were disembarked at Tajura, and some of them were sold there. The population of Tajura, which was led by Murad Agha, supported the Ottomans and fought alongside them in their attack on Tripoli.

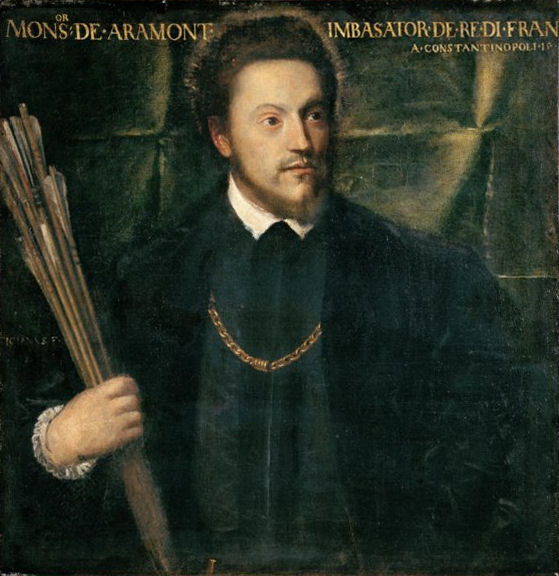
Portrait of Gabriel d'Aramont by Titian, c. 1541–1542

Shortly after the attack on Gozo, Gabriel d'Aramont – the French ambassador to the Ottoman Empire – arrived in Malta along with his secretary Nicolas de Nicolay. The Hospitallers persuaded them to go to Tripoli and attempt to prevent the siege. D'Aramont and de Nicolay departed Malta with three ships on 2 August, and by the time they arrived in Tripoli, the Ottomans were already in Tajura. Due to the Franco-Ottoman alliance, the Ottomans saluted them and allowed them to land.

Admiral Sinan Pasha, who commanded the Ottoman forces along with Dragut, sent a message to Governor Gaspard de Vallier in which he promised to spare Tripoli's garrison if the city were surrendered peacefully, but threatened that it would be treated as a conquered city should it be taken by force. De Vallier replied that he was ready to defend the city until death. At the time, the city was garrisoned by between 30 and 200 knights and 500 to 630 soldiers, including the Calabrian and Sicilian mercenaries.

D'Aramont attempted to dissuade the Ottomans from besieging Tripoli and threatened to sail to Constantinople to make his case to Suleiman, but he was then barred from leaving until the end of the siege. The Ottomans and the residents of Tajura began their siege of Tripoli on 8 August. They dug trenches and set up three artillery batteries of twelve guns in front of the main fortress. A soldier from Provence who had been tasked with manning the Xercia city gate defected to the Ottomans and pointed out a weak point in the fortifications; this area was subsequently bombarded and the walls were breached.

The Calabrian soldiers, who had only been in the city for a month and were stationed in the small fort at the mouth of Tripoli's harbour, reportedly plotted to desert their posts, blow up a gunpowder magazine and escape to Sicily on a brigantine. This came to the attention of their commanding officer Des Roches, who reported the plot to de Vallier, but the latter was reluctant to punish the would-be mutineers. The soldiers petitioned de Vallier to surrender the city, and there was also distrust among the knights from various nationalities, who disagreed on whether or not the breach was defensible and who feared that if the city fell the French knights might be spared through d'Aramont's mediation while the rest would be massacred. When it became clear that there would be no Christian relief force, de Vallier and his council decided on 13 August to negotiate an honourable surrender.

Two Spanish knights were accordingly sent as emissaries to Sinan Pasha, who offered to spare the knights if they paid the expenses of the siege. The knights did not accept, as they did not have the resources to meet this demand, but at the urging of Murad Agha, Sinan eased the terms, recalled the emissaries, and offered to spare 300 men if the city capitulated. Sinan requested a meeting with the city's Governor, and de Vallier met him in person while accompanied by the knight De Montfort. During the meeting, de Vallier was imprisoned, but De Montfort was allowed to return to Tripoli.

The knights attempted to persuade the garrison to continue resisting, but there was reportedly chaos when news of the terms circulated within the city. The Hospitallers accepted, and Tripoli capitulated on 14 August 1551. Grand Master de Homedes and the Order's Council on Malta were not consulted prior to the city's surrender. The mutineers were told that the terms of surrender allowed them to depart to Sicily, and they are said to have rushed out of Tripoli, where they were surrounded and imprisoned by Ottoman cavalry. The knights who surrendered were also imprisoned. Des Roches continued to resist until his position was no longer tenable, after which he and some 30 men under his command managed to escape by boat, probably towards d'Aramont's ships.

On 15 August, part of the city's garrison including the Hospitaller knights left Tripoli for Malta on ships provided by d'Aramont. Sources disagree on how many were spared: some claim that only 100 Frenchmen were spared through the ambassador's intervention; the latter also reportedly personally paid for the ransom of some others. Other sources claim that those who were allowed to leave amounted to 100 knights and 100 soldiers, or 300 men in accordance with the terms of surrender. After the city fell, 200 Moors who served the Hospitallers as auxiliaries were executed. The remainder of the garrison, including some Maltese and Rhodian soldiers and the Calabrian mercenaries who had mutinied, were enslaved.

== Aftermath ==
=== Governance of Tripoli ===
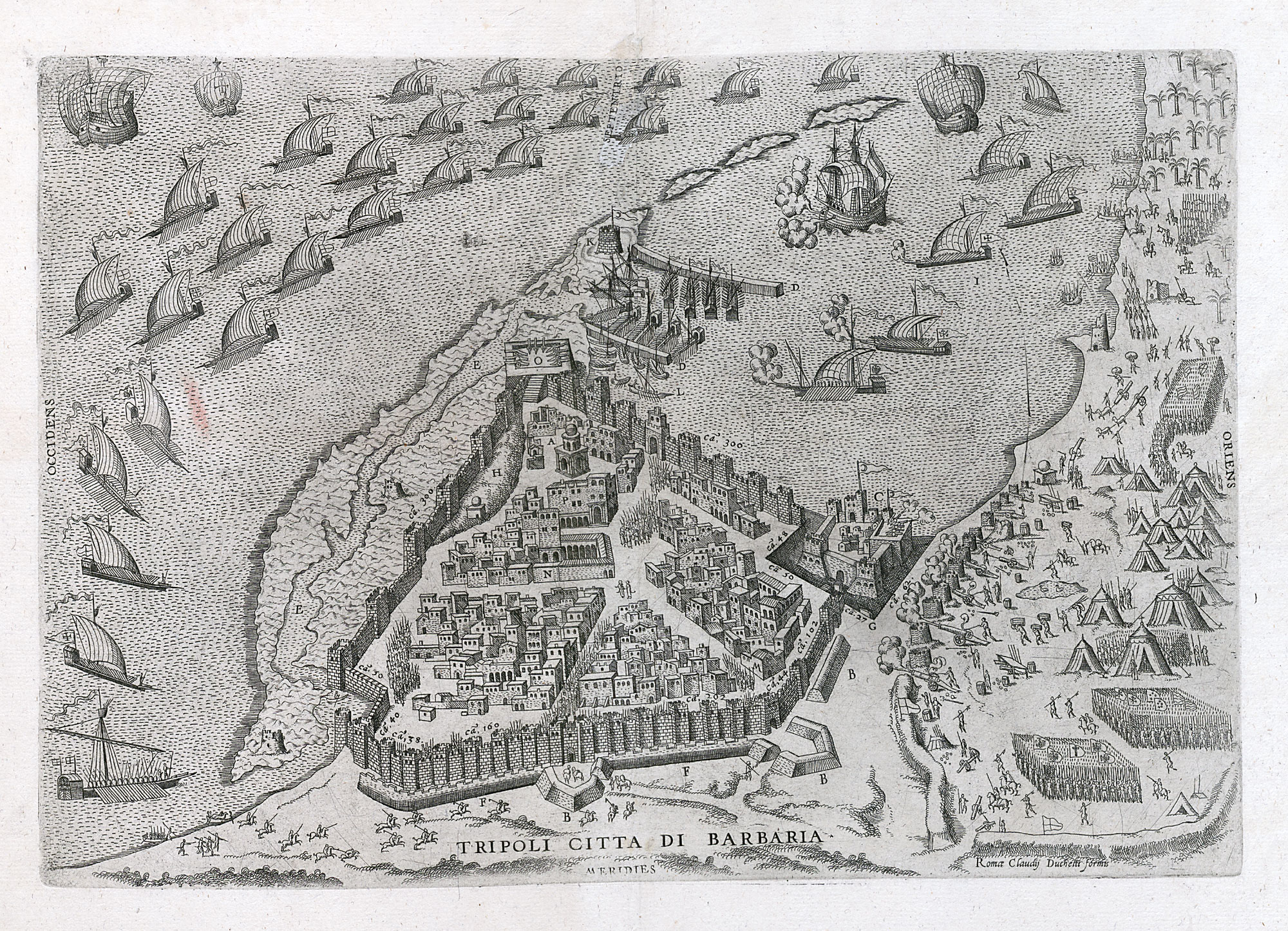
Map of Tripoli, c. 1570

After the capture of the city, Sinan Pasha appointed Murad Agha as its beylerbey. He successfully consolidated Ottoman control over the region, made improvements to Tripoli's fortifications and built a fortified mosque at Tajura. Dragut had also been promised governorship over Tripoli before he had joined the expedition, and upon the appointment of Murad Agha, he left North Africa in protest and sailed to the Tyrrhenian Sea and later to Constantinople with the rest of the Ottoman ships, whose crews had declared that they would only accept him as their commander. In order to placate him, Suleiman offered Dragut governorship of Karlieli instead and instructed Sinan Pasha to follow Dragut's orders.

Dragut was eventually appointed beylerbey of Tripoli instead of Murad Agha in 1553–1554. Dragut continued to consolidate Ottoman control over Tripolitania, and he further strengthened the city's defences with the construction of a new fortress. Under Dragut's rule, Tripoli became one of the best-defended cities in Africa. He also commissioned the construction of several buildings within the city, and in around 1560 he converted the main Hospitaller church into the Sidi Darghut Mosque. Dragut turned Tripoli into a major base for the Barbary corsairs, and used it to launch attacks such as the 1558 sack of Reggio, during which most of the town's inhabitants were enslaved and taken to Tripoli. He continued to rule the city until 1565, when he was killed in action while fighting the Hospitallers during the Great Siege of Malta.

Tripoli remained under direct or indirect Ottoman rule until it was captured by Italy during the Italo-Turkish War in 1911.

=== European reactions ===
D'Aramont and de Nicolay returned to Malta on 23 August, and they were coldly received and were accused of treason by the Hospitallers. D'Aramont left for Constantinople shortly afterwards, but while in Malta he wrote a letter about his intervention to King Henry II of France. His was widely criticized by Charles V and Pope Julius III on suspicion that he had encouraged the Ottomans to take the city. It appeared that d'Aramont had participated in the Ottomans' victory banquet, raising further suspicions about his role in the siege, and leading to claims by Charles V that France participated in the siege. In any instance, d'Aramont had a special relationship with the Ottomans, and was clearly aware that the fall of Tripoli represented a major setback for Charles V. As the Hospitallers had accused d'Aramont of being an impostor, the King of France sent an envoy to Homedes. After the Order's Council discussed the matter and the French king's letter, the accusations against d'Aramont were dropped, and he was thanked for his services.

Homedes still needed scapegoats to take the blame for the sacking of Gozo and the loss of Tripoli, and he is said to have wanted de Vallier and former Governor of Gozo Galatian de Sesse to pay with their lives. Upon his return to Malta, de Vallier was put on trial, as were the knights Fuster, De Sousa and Herrera. French knight Nicolas Durand de Villegaignon spoke in de Vallier's defence and blamed the loss of Tripoli on Homedes' negligence and avarice. The Calabrian soldiers who remained in Ottoman captivity and who thus could not defend themselves were subsequently blamed for the city's fall, but de Vallier and the three other knights were stripped from the habit and cross of the Order.

The Hospitallers anticipated that another Ottoman attack on Malta would take place in the sailing season of 1552, and on 11 September 1551, the Pope implored Homedes to transfer his headquarters to Syracuse or Messina on Sicily. In 1552 the Hospitallers began to extend Malta's fortifications in order to secure their position. Although the anticipated attack on Malta did not materialise, the siege of Tripoli proved to be the first step of the all-out Italian War of 1551–1559.

De Villegaignon and de Nicolay published accounts of the siege of Tripoli a few years after the event.

=== Attempts to retake Tripoli ===
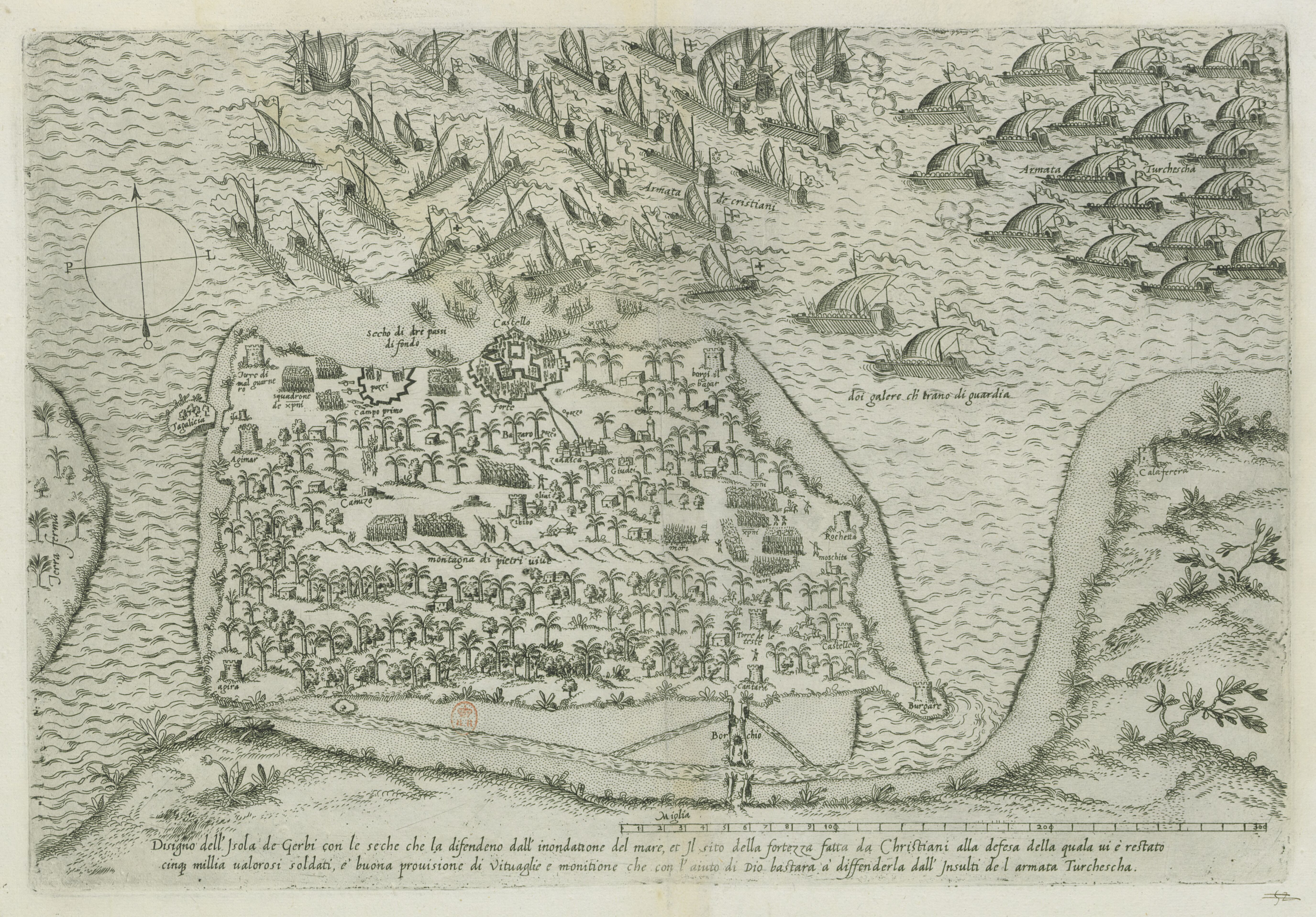
Engraving depicting the 1560 Battle of Djerba

The Hospitallers began making plans to recapture Tripoli shortly after they lost the city, and they raided its hinterland in 1552. That year, a Hospitaller force landed at Zuwarah and began to sack the town, but the knights were repelled and were forced to retreat by an Ottoman counterattack led by Murad Agha.

After former Governor of Tripoli de Valette was elected as Hospitaller Grand Master in 1557, he still hoped to retake the city. In response to the previous year's attack on Reggio, in summer 1559 a coalition of Christian states assembled an invasion force for this purpose in Messina. The fleet left for Tripoli in February 1560 but was unable to storm the city due to inclement weather and disease, and instead captured the island of Djerba. An Ottoman fleet led by Piali Pasha and Dragut defeated the Christian fleet at the Battle of Djerba in May 1560, and the remaining Spanish garrison on the island capitulated in July 1560. This marked the final Christian attempt to reestablish control over Tripoli.
