= Spanish Tripoli =

Presidio of the Spanish Empire in North Africa

Tripoli Trípoli طرابلس
- 1510–1530
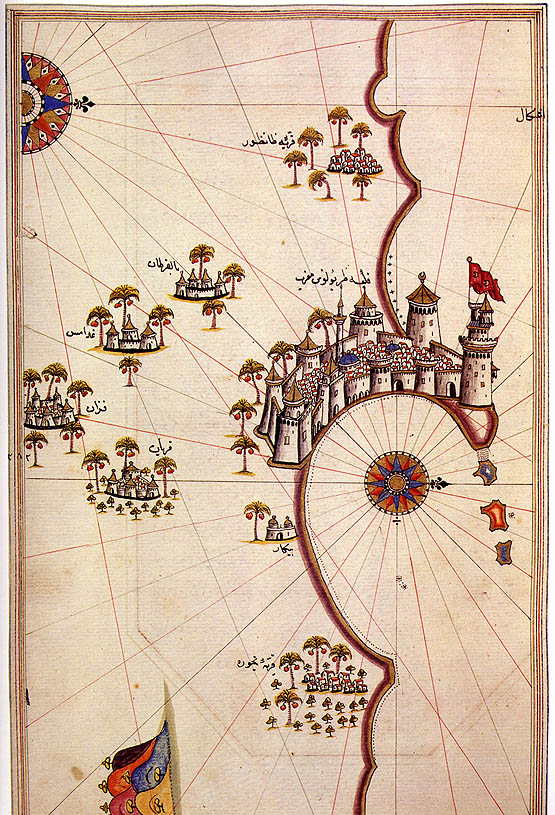
- Early 16th century map of Tripoli by Piri Reis
- Status: Territory of the Spanish Empire under the jurisdiction of Sicily
- Capital: Tripoli
- Common languages: Spanish (official); Libyan Arabic
- Religion: Roman Catholicism; Sunni Islam
- Governor
  - 1510: Pedro Navarro (first)
  - 1520–1530: François Velasquès (last)
- Historical era: Early modern period
  - Spanish conquest: 25 July 1510
  - Hospitaller fief: 23 March 1530
  - Disestablished: 25 July 1530
- Currency: Spanish real, gold dinar, dirham
Preceded by	Succeeded by
Hafsid dynasty	Hospitaller Tripoli
- Today part of: Libya

Tripoli, today the capital city of Libya, was a presidio of the Spanish Empire in North Africa between 1510 and 1530. The city was captured by Spanish forces in July 1510, and for the next two decades it was administered as an outpost which fell under the jurisdiction of the Spanish Viceroy of Sicily. The city was granted as a fief to the Knights Hospitaller in 1530, and the latter ruled the city until 1551.

== History ==
Tripoli was captured by a Spanish force led by Count Pedro Navarro in 1510, and most of the city's population was killed, enslaved or displaced in the process. The Spanish subsequently encouraged Christian settlers to repopulate the city, although these attempts were largely unsuccessful. The Spanish later also encouraged Muslim former inhabitants to return to Tripoli, and they permitted the sheikh who had been exiled to Sicily to return. These efforts were also fruitless.

Spanish control of the city and its hinterland remained tenuous and it was never fully secured. Their authority was only intermittently present in areas located within 10 miles (16 km) of the city. An attack on the city was planned by Barbary pirates in 1512, and it was further threatened after Oruç Reis and Hayreddin Barbarossa captured Algiers from Spain in 1515. The sheikh escaped to Tajura in 1526, which subsequent became a base for Muslim resistance against Spanish rule. The Spanish made some repair works to Tripoli's castle by taking stonework from the city's fortifications, but the defences were otherwise neglected.

After the Knights Hospitaller were expelled from their base in Rhodes during an Ottoman siege in 1522, they entered negotiations with Spanish Emperor Charles V who offered them Tripoli and the islands of Malta and Gozo as their new base. A delegation sent by the Hospitallers produced a report which stated that these locations were unfavourable, and they were reluctant to accept both Tripoli and the Maltese Islands because of the distance between them and the considerable expenses that would be necessary to maintain them.

The Hospitallers eventually accepted Tripoli, Malta and Gozo as a fief on 23 March 1530, and they took control of the city on 25 July. Tripoli remained under Hospitaller rule until 1551, when it was captured by the Ottoman Empire.

== Government ==
Tripoli was administered by a Governor, and it fell under the jurisdiction of the Viceroy of Sicily.

== Economy ==
While Tripoli was under Spanish rule, some trade between Europe and Africa flowed through the city, but it was very limited. The main source of revenue for the Spanish administration was a poll tax on the importation of slaves.

== See also ==
- European enclaves in North Africa before 1830
- Red Castle of Tripoli
