= Klassi Ghalina & The History of the World =

Klassi Ghalina & The History of the World is a 2018 Maltese comedy film directed by Alan Cassar and starring the cast of the series Klassi Ghalina, which started airing on the Maltese television station ONE in 2011.

== Synopsis ==
In this film, Mr. Xrieha and the students go back in time, where they meet Adam and Eve, Romeo and Juliet and experience the Great Siege of Malta, amongst other mishaps. Before this film, in 2017, Alan Cassar wrote and directed Klassi Ghalina: Mission to Moscow. After Klassi Ghalina & The History of the World, Cassar wrote and directed Klassi Ghalina vs Dracula, which was released in 2020.

== Cast ==
Ray Attard as Mr. Xrieha

Trevor Mizzi as Terrence

Andy Catania as Gino Bugeja

Manuel Cucciardi as Teddy Lagana

Raissa Sammut as Whitney Smith Farrugia

Marco Grech as Giocondo

Jovana Kuzeljevic as Meggie

Rainer Cassar as Zeppi

Mario Gatt as Spiru

Xylon Bristow as Daiton

Charles Nova as tas-7.15

Maria Cassar Inguanez as Lola Grech

Dominic Aquilina as Head Master Busietta

J.J Curmi as Hufta

Jason Curmi as Marci l-Purtinar

Oliver Pace as Hopleaf

Dione Galea as Pirate Captain

Clint Grech as Pirate Ship Captain

Thea Montanaro as Eve / Juliet

Sean Galea as Adam / Romeo

Sharon Aquilina as Secretary

Romina Genuis as Miss Borg

Gino Lombardi as La Vallette

== Release ==
The film was released in Malta on December 12, 2018. It premiered in Galleria Cinemas.
