= Spanish conquest of Tripoli =

1551 military conquest of Tripoli

Conquest of Tripoli
| Date | 25 July 1510 |
| Location | Tripoli (present-day Libya) |
| Result | Spanish victory |
| Territorial changes | Tripoli under Spanish rule until 1530 |

Belligerents
| Crown of Aragon; Kingdom of Sicily | Hafsid dynasty |

Commanders and leaders
| Pedro Navarro | |

Strength
| c. 15,000 men | |

Casualties and losses
| c. 300 killed | c. 3,000–5,000 killed c. 5,000–10,000 enslaved |

The Conquest of Tripoli was a maritime campaign led by Pedro Navarro which captured the city of Tripoli in North Africa in the name of the Crown of Aragon in 1510.

== Background ==
Navarro was a commander in the service of King Ferdinand II of Aragon, and plans to capture Tripoli began after the King of Tlemcen agreed to pay a tribute to Aragon on 5 June 1510. The invasion force consisted of some 15,000 men, including 3000 soldiers from Sicily. Navarro's fleet set sail from Sicily and landed at Malta, where he was joined by five galleys and some Maltese guides and a pilot. The fleet departed Malta on 20 July and arrived off the coast of Tripoli four days later.

== Battle ==
On the morning of 25 July 1510, St James's Day, the invasion force attacked the city and its castle. Approximately 6,000 marines came from Spanish ships, half of whom besieged the city, while the others stayed in the camp to prevent an Ottoman attack from the hinterland. With the effective use of naval artillery, the Spanish quickly captured the Maghreb city. Tripoli surrendered after about three hours of heavy fighting in the city's streets.

The Spanish conquest devastated Tripoli. Prior to the attack, the city was inhabited by about 15,000 to 20,000 people. Between 3000 and 5000 were killed during the attack, while 5000 to 10000 others were enslaved. A considerable number of Jews who were enslaved were sent to Sicily, where some converted to Christianity. Some of the city's inhabitants managed to escape to the nearby settlements of Janzur and Tajura. Spanish casualties were low, with some 300 men losing their lives. About 170 Christians who had been slaves in Tripoli (most of whom were from Sicily or Malta) were freed after the attack.

== Aftermath ==
Tripoli remained under Spanish rule until 1530, when it was granted to the Hospitallers. The latter ruled the city until they were expelled by Ottoman captain Dragut in a siege in 1551.

== See also ==
- Spanish Tripoli
