= Hospitaller Malta =

Period in the history of Malta from 1530 to 1798

Monastic State of the Order of Saint John of Jerusalem (Note: Latin: Status Monasticus Ordinis Sancti Ioannis Hierosolymitani, Italian: Stato Monastico dell'Ordine di San Giovanni di Gerusalemme, Maltese: Stat Monastiku tal-Ordni ta’ San Ġwann ta’ Ġerusalemm. As the Knights Hospitaller went by several names, several variants of the name of the state exist.)
- 1530–1798
- Flag Coat of arms

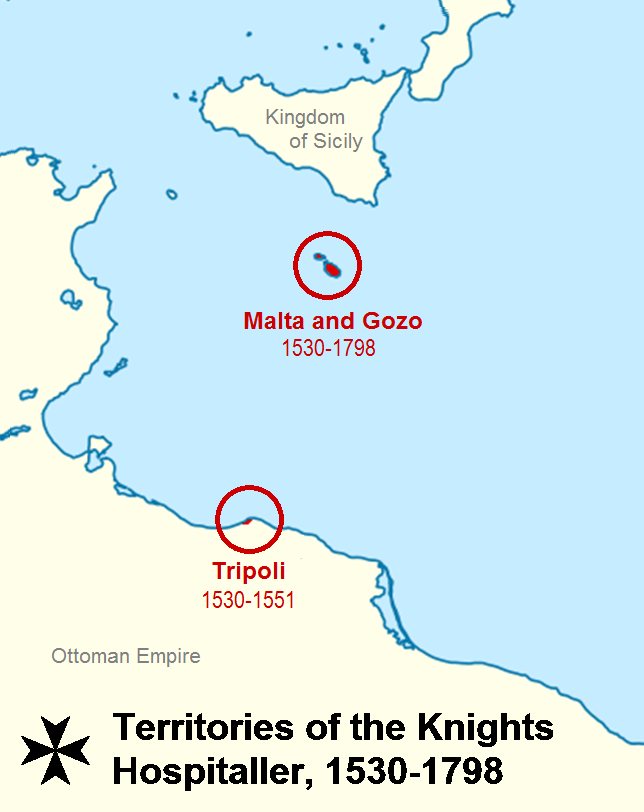
- Map of Malta and Gozo in relation to Sicily and Hospitaller Tripoli

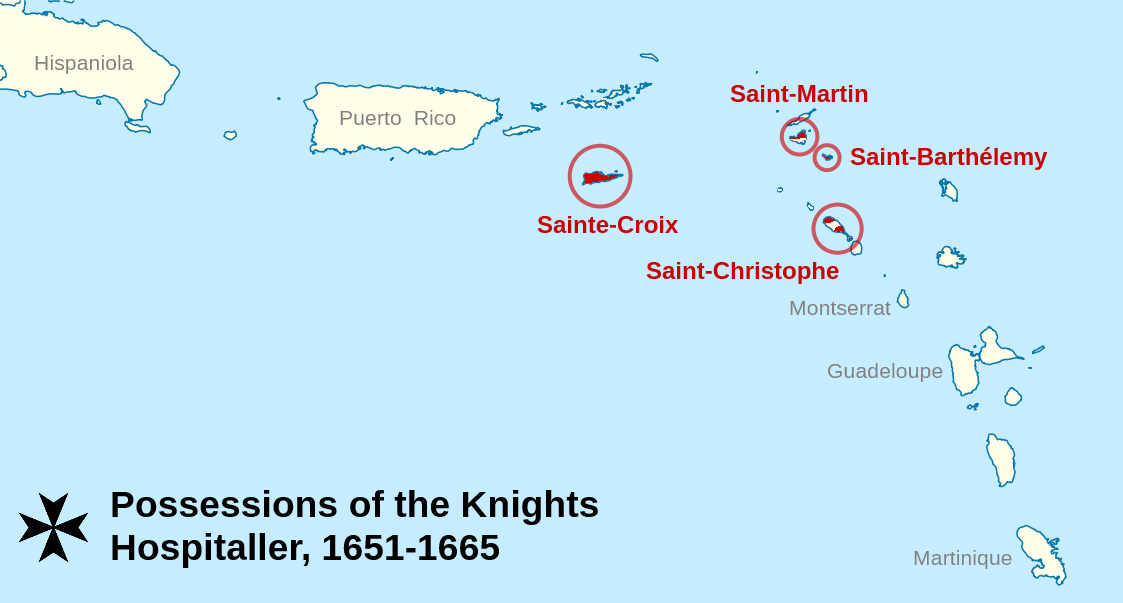
- Map of the Order's territories in the Caribbean
- Status: Tributary state of the Kingdom of Sicily (until 1753); Sovereign state (1753–1798)
- Capital: Birgu (1530–1571); Valletta (1571–1798)
- Common languages: Official languages: Latin; Italian; Vernacular languages: French; Maltese (majority)
- Religion: Roman Catholicism
- Demonym: Maltese
- Government: Theocratic elective monarchy
- Grand Master
  - 1530–1534: Philippe Villiers de L'Isle-Adam (first)
  - 1797–1798: Ferdinand von Hompesch zu Bolheim (last)
- Historical era: Early modern period
  - Agreement: 24 March 1530
  - Established: 26 October 1530
  - Loss of Tripoli: 15 August 1551
  - Purchase of Caribbean territories: 21 May 1651
  - Sale of Caribbean territories: 1665
  - Proclamation of sovereignty: 1753
  - Capitulation to the French: 12 June 1798

Area
  - Total: 316 km^{2} (122 sq mi)

Population
  - 1530 (estimate): 33,000
  - 1632 (census): 51,750
  - 1741 (estimate): 110,000
- Currency: Maltese scudo Other currencies: Spanish dollars/doubloons Venetian zecchini Livournine Genovine Louis d'or
Preceded by
Kingdom of Sicily
Habsburg Spain
Company of the American Islands
Heitersheim
Succeeded by
French occupation of Malta
Ottoman Tripolitania
French West India Company
Sovereign Military Order of Malta
Grand Duchy of Baden
- Area and population excluding Tripoli and the Caribbean islands

Hospitaller Malta, known in Maltese history as the Knights' Period (Maltese: Żmien il-Kavallieri, lit. 'Time of the Knights'), was a de facto state which existed between 1530 and 1798 when the Mediterranean islands of Malta and Gozo were ruled by the Order of St. John of Jerusalem. It was formally a vassal state of the Kingdom of Sicily, and it came into being when Emperor Charles V granted the islands as well as the city of Tripoli in modern Libya to the Order, following the latter's loss of Rhodes in 1522. Later in 1548 Charles V elevated the Order controlled town of Heitersheim of the Holy Roman Empire, to the status of a principality, granting the Order formal control of the fief. Hospitaller Tripoli was lost to the Ottoman Empire in 1551, but an Ottoman attempt to take Malta in 1565 failed.

Following the 1565 siege, the Order decided to settle permanently in Malta and began to construct a new capital city, Valletta. For the next two centuries, Malta went through a Golden Age, characterized by a flourishing of the arts, architecture, and an overall improvement in Maltese society. In the mid-17th century, the Order was the de jure proprietor over some islands in the Caribbean, making it the smallest state to colonize the Americas.

The Order began to decline in the 1770s, and was severely weakened by the French Revolution in 1792. In 1798, French forces under Napoleon invaded Malta and expelled the Order, resulting in the French occupation of Malta. The Maltese eventually rebelled against the French, and the islands became a British protectorate in 1800. Malta was to be returned to the Order by the Treaty of Amiens in 1802, but the British remained in control and the islands formally became a British colony by the Treaty of Paris in 1814. The Order's last formal territory, the Principality of Heitersheim, was annexed by the Grand Duchy of Baden just a few months before the dissolution of the Holy Roman Empire on 12 June 1806.

== Sixteenth century ==
=== Early years ===
The Order of Saint John was expelled from its base in Rhodes during the Ottoman siege of 1522. After seven years of moving from place to place in Europe, the Knights became established in 1530 when Emperor Charles V, as King of Sicily, gave them Malta, Gozo and the North African port of Tripoli in perpetual fiefdom in exchange for an annual fee of a single Maltese falcon, which they were to send on All Souls' Day to the King's representative, the Viceroy of Sicily.

The Order settled in the town of Birgu and made it their capital. The ancient fortress known as Castrum Maris was rebuilt as Fort Saint Angelo, the town's defences were strengthened, and many new buildings were constructed. The Order soon began to mint its own coins as it settled in Malta.

The Hospitallers continued their actions against the Muslims and especially the Barbary pirates. Although they had only a few ships, they quickly drew the ire of the Ottomans, who were unhappy to see the order resettled. In July 1551, Ottoman forces attempted to take over Fort Saint Angelo and later Mdina but saw that they were outnumbered and invaded Gozo several days later. They sailed to Tripoli and captured the city in August. Following these attacks, the Order tried to repopulate Gozo and strengthen the Grand Harbour fortifications. Several forts including Saint Elmo and Saint Michael were built, and the city of Senglea began to develop around the latter fort.

Sometime between 1551 and 1556, a tornado hit Malta, destroyed at least four of the Order's galleys, and killed 600 people. This is the worst natural disaster that ever occurred on Malta and one of the deadliest tornadoes in recorded history.

In 1553, Charles V offered a third possession to the Order, the city of Mahdia in modern Tunisia. However, the Order refused to take control of the city since the commission that was set up decided that it would be too expensive to maintain. Therefore, the emperor ordered the Viceroy of Sicily, Juan de Vega, to destroy Mehdia to prevent Muslim occupation. De Vega burnt Mehdia, but retaliated against Malta for not accepting the city, and prohibited exportation of wheat to the island. To combat this, Grandmaster Sengle brought the engineer Vincenzo Vogo to Malta to upgrade the mills so the population would not starve. Authors such as Giovanni Francesco Abela claim that, following the Battle of Verbia in 1561, the Order may have gained a puppet state in Moldavia, which was ruled by the Malta native Iacob Heraclid until 1563; their assessment remains disputed.

=== Great Siege and aftermath ===
In 1565 Suleiman sent an invasion force of about 40,000 men to besiege the 700 knights and 8,000 soldiers and expel them from Malta and gain a new base from which to possibly launch another assault on Europe. At first the battle went as badly for the Hospitallers as Rhodes had: most of the cities were destroyed and about half the knights killed. On 18 August the position of the besieged was becoming desperate: dwindling daily in numbers, they were becoming too feeble to hold the long line of fortifications. But when his council suggested the abandonment of Birgu and Senglea and withdrawal to Fort St. Angelo, Grand Master Jean Parisot de Valette refused.

The Viceroy of Sicily had not sent help; possibly the Viceroy's orders from Philip II of Spain were so obscurely worded as to put on his own shoulders the burden of the decision whether to help the Knights at the expense of his own defences. A wrong decision could mean defeat and exposing Sicily and Naples to the Ottomans. He had left his own son with de Valette, so he could hardly be indifferent to the fate of the fortress. Whatever may have been the cause of his delay, the Viceroy hesitated until the battle had almost been decided by the unaided efforts of the Knights, before being forced to move by the indignation of his own officers.

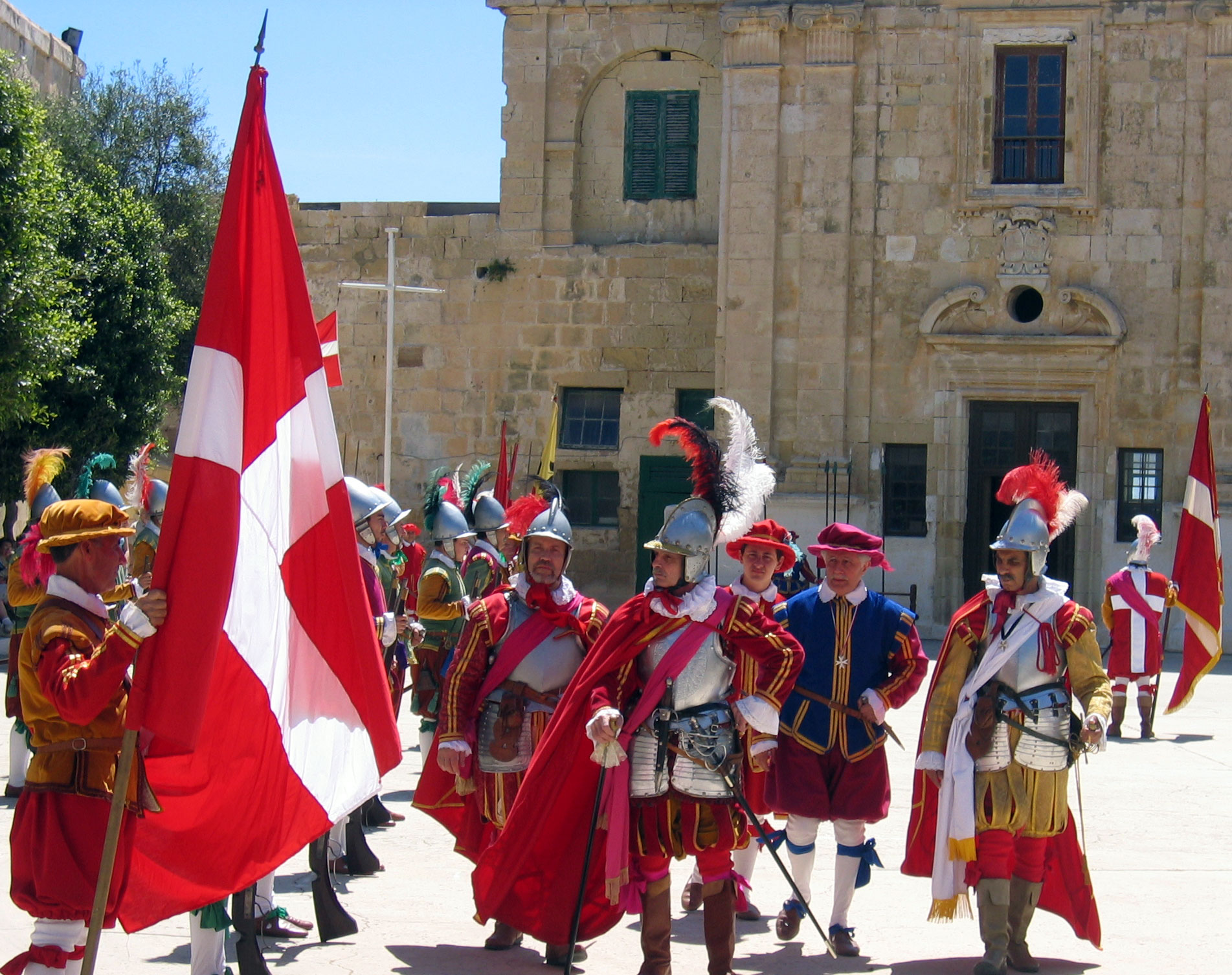
Re-enactment of military drills of the Knights at Fort Saint Elmo in 2005

On 23 August came yet another grand assault, the last serious effort, as it proved, of the besiegers. It was thrown back with the greatest difficulty, even the wounded taking part in the defence. The plight of the Turkish forces, however, was now desperate. With the exception of Fort Saint Elmo, the fortifications were still intact. Working night and day the garrison had repaired the breaches, and the capture of Malta seemed more and more impossible. Many of the Ottoman troops in crowded quarters had fallen ill over the terrible summer months. Ammunition and food were beginning to run short, and the Ottoman troops were becoming increasingly dispirited by the failure of their attacks and their losses. The death on 23 June of skilled commander Dragut, a corsair and admiral of the Ottoman fleet, was a serious blow. The Turkish commanders, Piyale Pasha and Mustafa Pasha, were careless. They had a huge fleet which they used with effect on only one occasion. They neglected their communications with the African coast and made no attempt to watch and intercept Sicilian reinforcements.

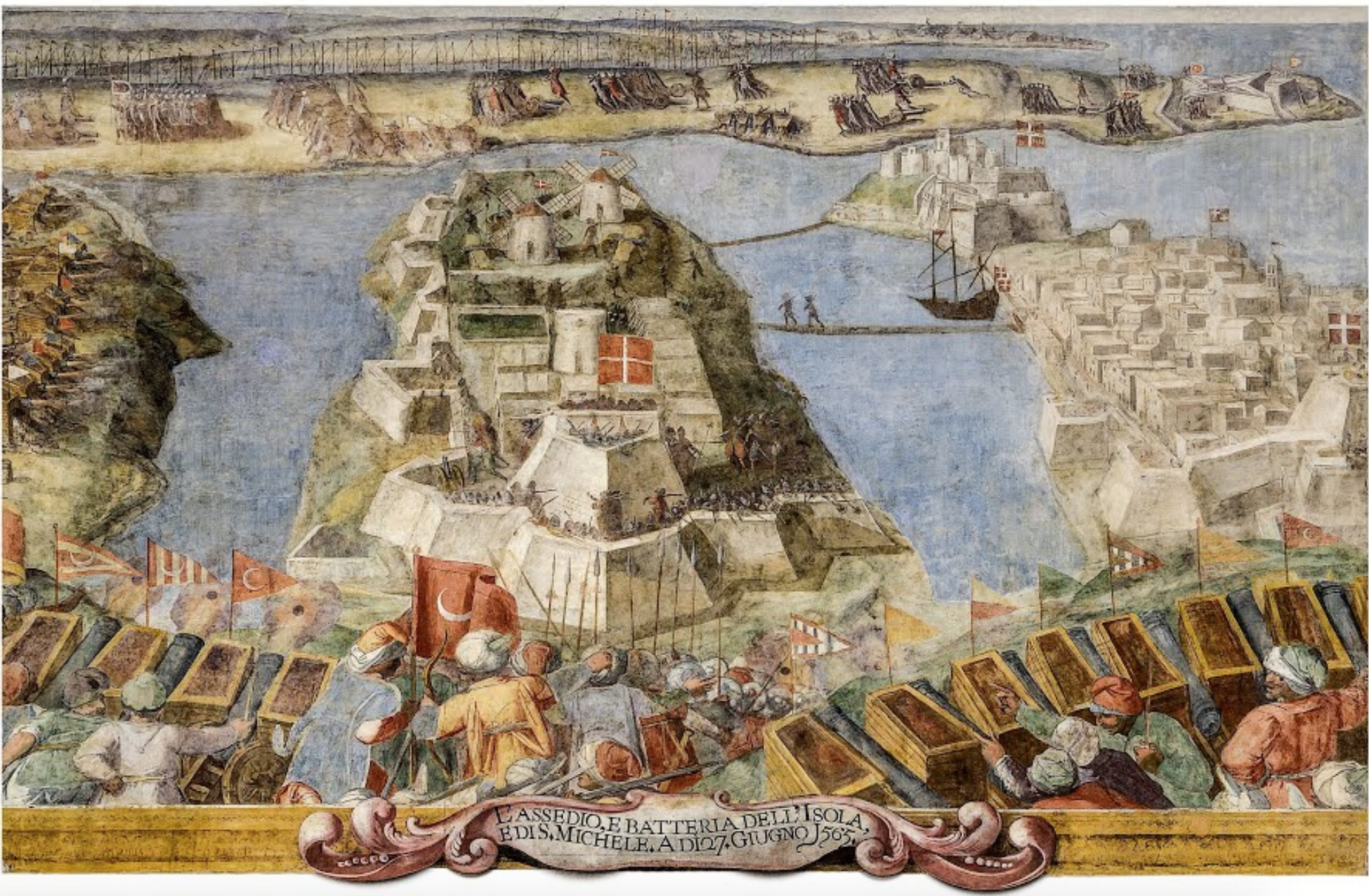
Great Siege of Malta frescos at the Grandmaster's Palace

On 1 September they made their last effort, but the morale of the Ottoman troops had deteriorated seriously and the attack was feeble, to the great encouragement of the besieged who now began to see hopes of deliverance. The perplexed and indecisive Ottomans heard of the arrival of Sicilian reinforcements in Mellieħa Bay. Unaware that the force was very small, they broke off the siege and left on 8 September. The Great Siege of Malta may have been the last action in which a force of knights won a decisive victory.

When the Ottomans departed, the Hospitallers had but 600 men able to bear arms. The most reliable estimate puts the number of the Ottoman army at its height at some 40,000 men, of whom 15,000 eventually returned to Constantinople. The siege is portrayed vividly in the frescoes of Matteo Perez d'Aleccio in the Hall of St. Michael and St. George, also known as the Throne Room, in the Grandmaster's Palace in Valletta; four of the original modellos, painted in oils by Perez d'Aleccio between 1576 and 1581, can be found in the Cube Room of the Queen's House at Greenwich, London.

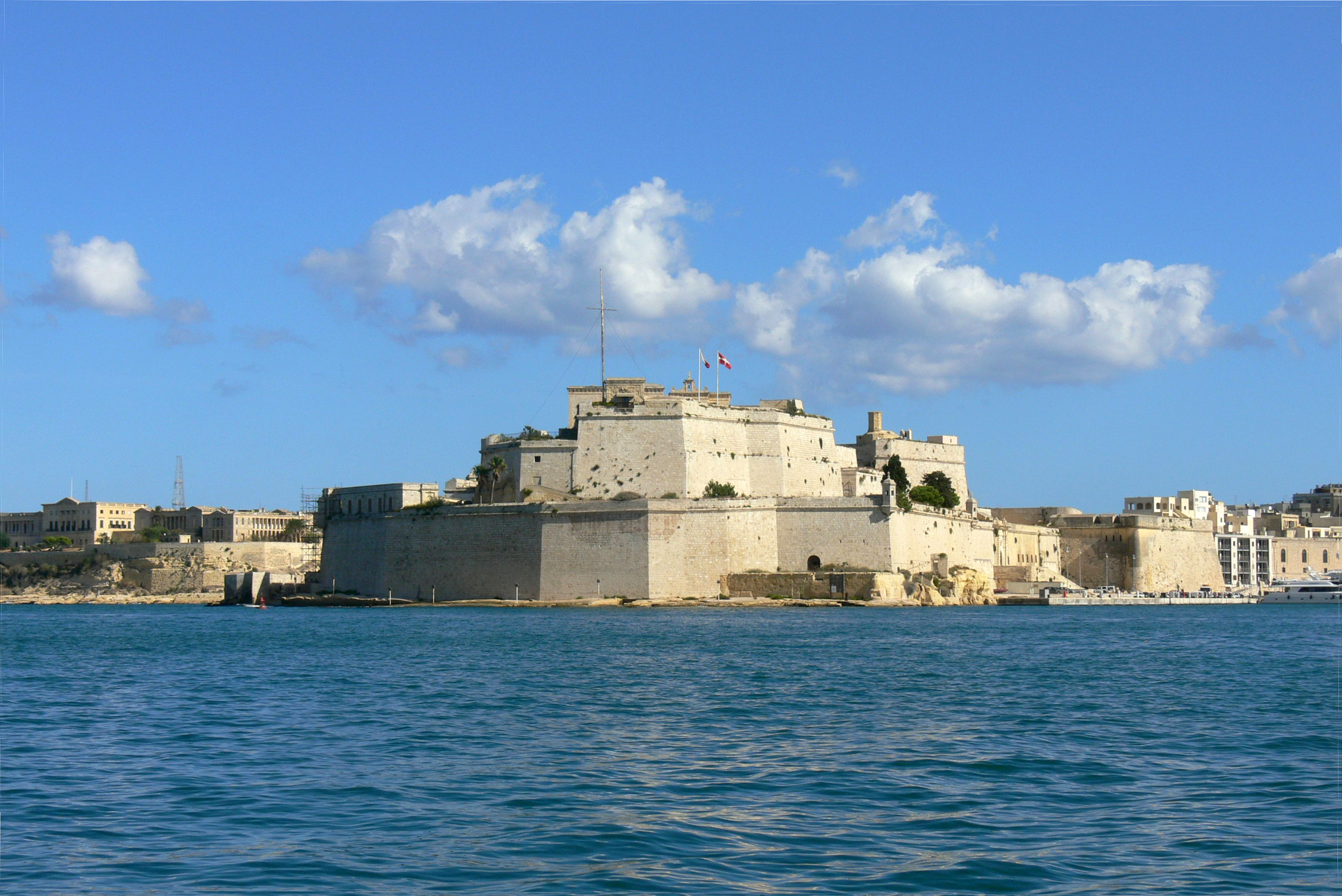
View of Fort Saint Angelo

After the siege a new city was built, Valletta, which was named in memory of the Grand Master who had withstood the siege. It became the Order's headquarters in 1571 and remains Malta's capital city to this day.

In 1574, the Roman Inquisition was established in Malta when Pope Gregory XIII sent Pietro Dusina as mediator between the Grandmaster and the Bishop. This inquisition replaced the old medieval inquisition in Malta that had been run by the Bishop of Palermo.

In 1581, there was a crisis between the General Convent of the Order and the Grandmaster, Jean de la Cassière. This escalated into a mutiny in which la Cassière was confined in Fort St Angelo and the knight Mathurin Romegas was elected Grandmaster. Pope Gregory XIII sent the envoy Gaspare Visconti to settle the dispute, and la Cassière and Romegas were summoned to Rome to explain and plead the case. Romegas died within a week of arriving in Rome, and la Cassière was restored to his position as Grandmaster. However, he too died within a month in Rome thus ending the dispute. In January 1582, Hugues Loubenx de Verdalle was elected Grandmaster.

== Seventeenth century ==
=== Main projects ===
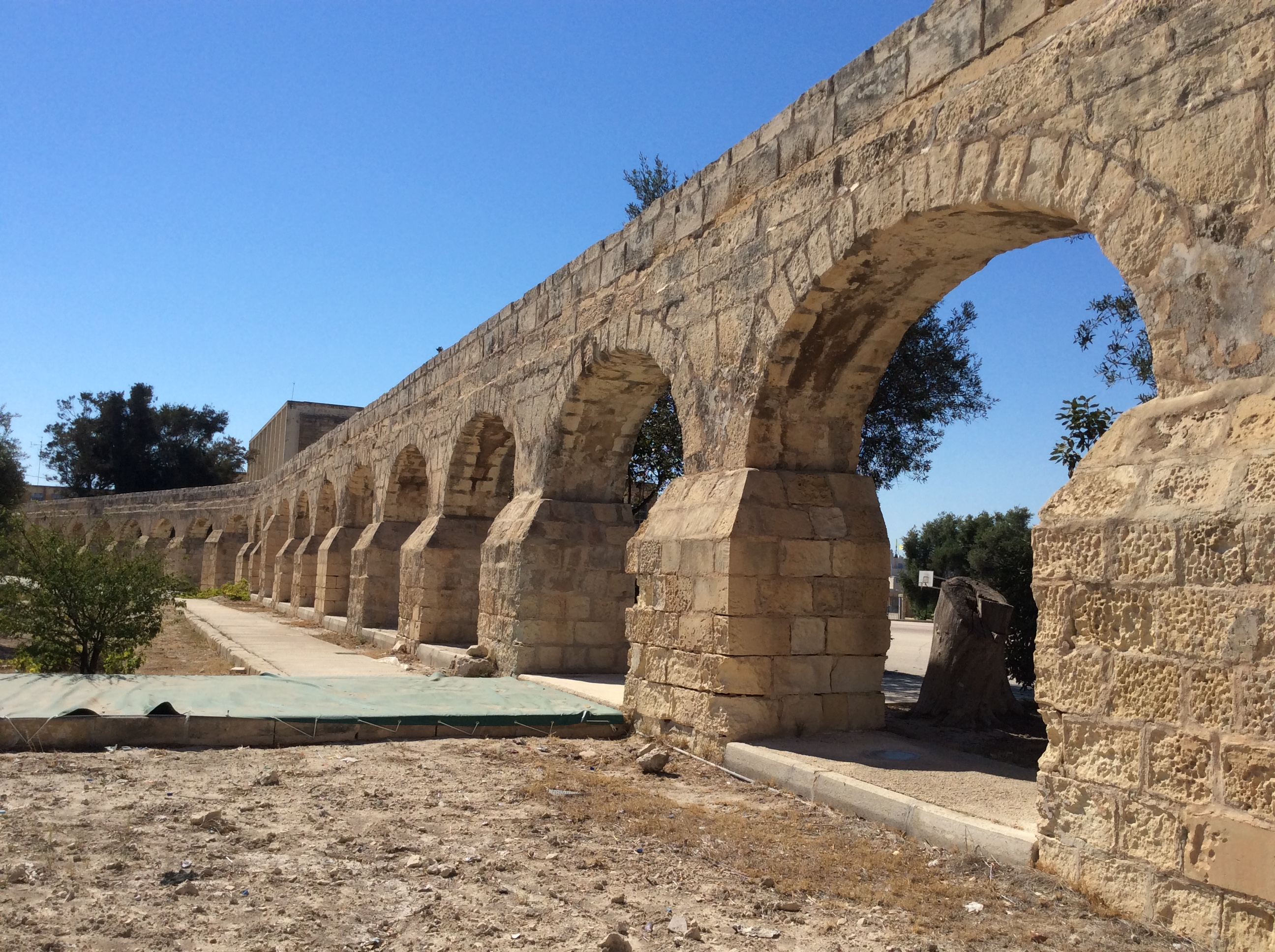
Wignacourt Aqueduct at Birkirkara

Between 1610 and 1615, the Wignacourt Aqueduct was built to carry water from Dingli and Rabat to the capital Valletta. This aqueduct remained in use until the early 20th century, and most of its arches still survive.

Throughout the course of the seventeenth century, Malta's fortifications were also improved. Large parts of Gozo's Cittadella were completely rebuilt between 1599 and 1622. The Grand Harbour area was strengthened by the construction of the Floriana Lines and Santa Margherita Lines in the 1630s and 1640s, which encircled the land front of Valletta and that of Birgu and Senglea. Later on, the Cottonera Lines were built around the Santa Margherita Lines between 1670 and 1680. Due to a lack of funds, the Santa Margherita and Cottonera Lines remained unfinished for many years before being completed. In the late seventeenth century, Fort Ricasoli was also built to protect the entrance to the Grand Harbour, while Fort Saint Elmo and Fort Saint Angelo were strengthened.

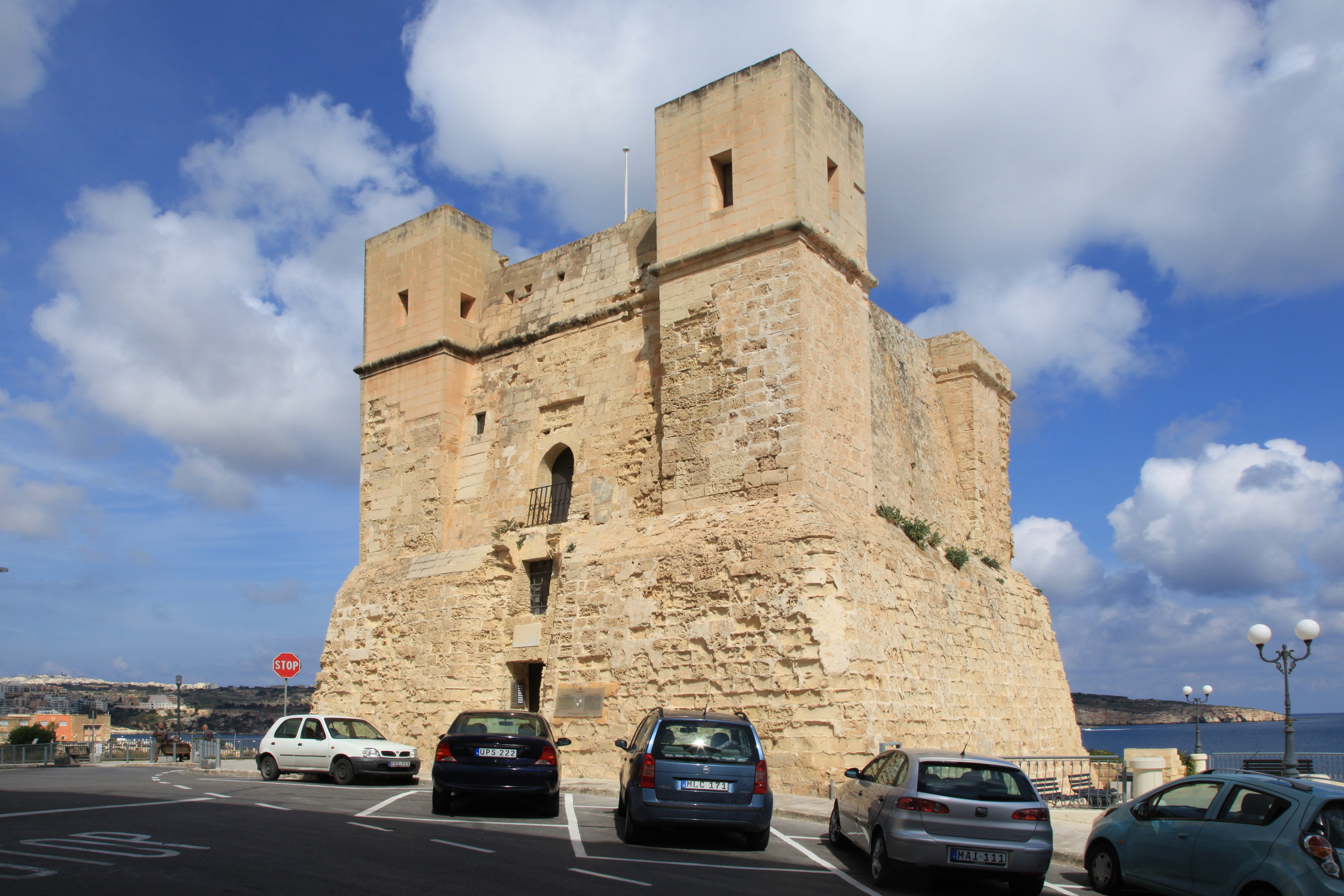
Wignacourt Tower, the oldest surviving watchtower in Malta

Despite the significant fortifications in the harbour area, by the early seventeenth century, most of the remaining coastline was still largely undefended. In 1605, Garzes Tower was built on the island of Gozo. In the following years, Alof de Wignacourt continued upgrading the coastal fortifications by building the Wignacourt towers, a series of six bastioned watch towers. During Grandmaster Lascaris' reign, a number of smaller towers were also built. His successor de Redin once again built a series of similar towers. The last coastal tower to be built was Isopu Tower, which was constructed in 1667 during the reign of Nicolas Cotoner.

In 1693, an earthquake damaged many buildings in Malta, particularly in the former capital of Mdina. The cathedral, which had been built during the Norman occupation of Malta, was subsequently demolished and a new Baroque cathedral was built in its place starting from 1697.

In the seventeenth and early eighteenth century, the Order's navy was at its peak. The Order, usually along with other European navies, engaged in naval battles against the Ottomans such as the action of 28 September 1644, or the Battle of the Dardanelles in 1656. They had also participated in the Battle of Lepanto in 1571 under the command of John of Austria. Corsairing also became an important part of the Maltese economy until the early 1700s.

=== Maltese Corso ===
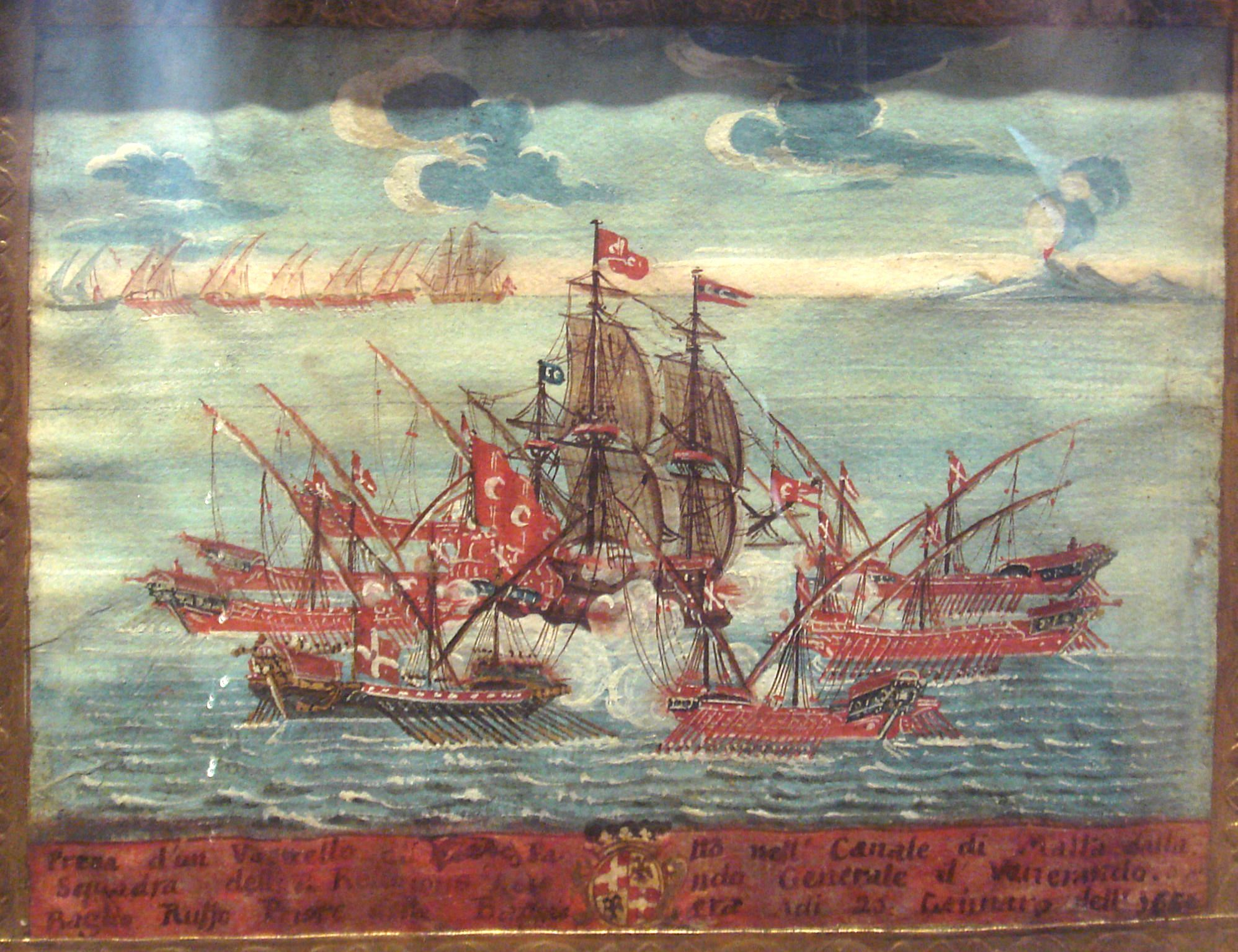
Hospitaller galleys capturing an Ottoman vessel in the Malta Channel in 1652

From 1530 to 1798 the Order of Malta waged a long-standing naval operation harassing Ottoman ships in the Mediterranean, reaching its peak from 1660 to 1675. It was an important source of income for the Order and employment for the local Maltese, profiting from plundered booty and the capture of Muslim slaves.

=== Colonization ===
A Maltese cross is featured on the coat of arms of Saint Barthélemy, a legacy of the Hospitaller colonization of the island.

The Order also took part in the colonization of the Americas. On 21 May 1651, it acquired four islands in the Caribbean: Saint Barthélemy, Saint Christopher, Saint Croix and Saint Martin. These were purchased from the French Company of the American Islands which had just been dissolved. The Order controlled the islands under the governorship of Phillippe de Longvilliers de Poincy until his death, and in 1665 the four islands were sold to the French West India Company. This marked the end of the Order's influence outside the Mediterranean.

== Eighteenth century ==
=== Beginning of the century to Pinto's reign ===
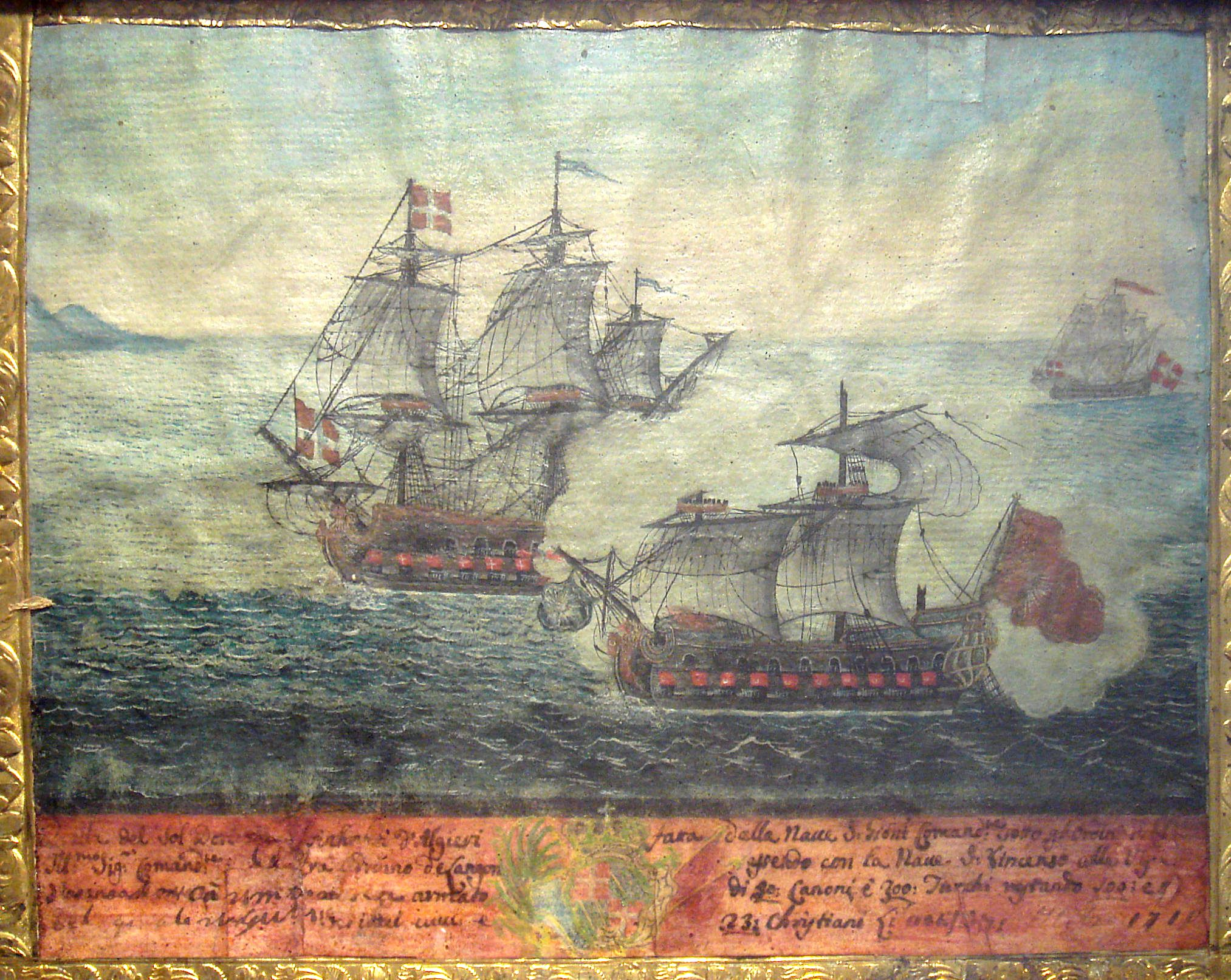
A naval battle between the Ottoman navy and the Order's fleet in 1719

At the end of the War of the Spanish Succession, the Treaty of Utrecht in 1713 granted Sicily from Spain to the Duke of Savoy, becoming the new sovereign of Malta until seven years later, when Treaty of The Hague reunited Naples and Sicily to the Emperor Charles VI. In 1735, during the War of the Polish Succession, Charles, Duke of Parma, defeated the occupying Austrians and became Charles VII of Naples and V of Sicily.

From 1714 onwards, about 52 batteries and redoubts, along with several entrenchments, were built around the coasts of Malta and Gozo. Other major fortifications of the 18th century include Fort Chambray on Gozo, which was built between 1749 and the 1760s, and Fort Tigné in Marsamxett, which was built between 1792 and 1795.

Throughout the eighteenth century, Baroque architecture was popular in Malta. This is mostly associated with the Grandmasters António Manoel de Vilhena and Manuel Pinto da Fonseca, both of whom were Portuguese. During de Vilhena's reign, the city of Mdina was significantly remodelled in the Baroque style. Other significant Baroque structures built during de Vilhena's reign include Fort Manoel and the Manoel Theatre. The town of Floriana also began to be developed around this era between the Floriana Lines and Valletta, and it was given the title of Borgo Vilhena by the Grandmaster. During Pinto's reign, which lasted from 1741 to 1773, the Baroque style was still going strong. Typical buildings from this era include Auberge de Castille and the Valletta Waterfront.

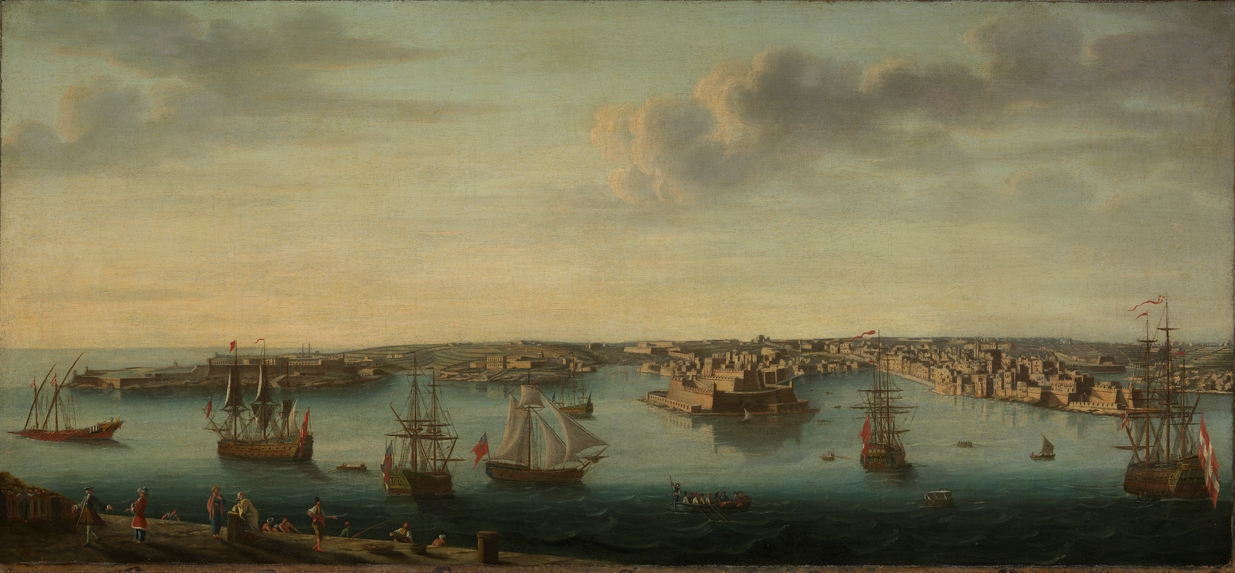
The Grand Harbour in 1750

In 1749, there was the Conspiracy of the Slaves, in which Turkish slaves were planning to revolt and assassinate Pinto, but this was suppressed before it started due to their plans leaking out to the Order.

In 1753, Pinto proclaimed the sovereignty of the Order on Malta and a dispute started with the Kingdom of Sicily under King Charles V. The dispute eventually ended a year later on 26 November 1754 when Sicily and the Order returned to normal relations. Despite this Sicily no longer had any control over the Maltese islands and Malta under the Order effectively became a sovereign state.

=== Decline ===
In the last three decades of the eighteenth century, the Order experienced a steady decline. This was a result of a number of factors, including the bankruptcy that was a result of Pinto's lavish rule, which drained the finances of the Order. Due to this, the Order also became unpopular with the Maltese.

In 1775, during the reign of Francisco Ximénez de Tejada, a revolt known as the Rising of the Priests occurred. Rebels managed to capture Fort St Elmo and Saint James Cavalier, but the revolt was suppressed and some of the leaders were executed while others were imprisoned or exiled.

In 1792, the Order's possessions in France were seized by the state due to the French Revolution, which led the already bankrupt Order into an even greater financial crisis. When Napoleon landed in Malta in June 1798, the knights could have withstood a long siege, but they surrendered the island almost without a fight. The French then occupied Malta until 1800, when they were ousted by Maltese revolutionaries aided by Great Britain. Malta became a British protectorate and although the Treaty of Amiens stated that they should be handed back to the Order, nothing materialized. When the new Grandmaster Giovanni Tommasi demanded that the British Civil Commissioner Alexander Ball hand back the Grandmaster's Palace in Valletta, Ball replied that Britain was authorised to continue basing troops on the island since some powers were still not recognising Malta's independence and that the government palace could not be vacated.

Malta eventually became a British colony in 1813 and remained as such until independence in 1964. The Order itself became dispersed throughout Europe, but in the early 19th century it redirected itself toward humanitarian and religious causes. In 1834, the Order, which became known as the Sovereign Military Order of Malta, established its headquarters in its former embassy in Rome, where it remains to this day.

== See also ==
- Hospitaller Rhodes
- Kingdom of Sicily
- List of Knights Hospitaller sites
- Principality of Heitersheim
