= Gaspard de Vallier =

Governor of Tripoli
- In office April 1551 – 15 August 1551
- Appointed by: Juan de Homedes y Coscon
- Preceded by: Pedro Nuñez de Herrera
- Succeeded by: Murad Agha (as Pasha of Tripoli)

Personal details
- Born: Auvergne, France

Military service
- Allegiance: (Sovereign Military Order of Malta) Order of Saint John
- Battles/wars: Siege of Tripoli (1551)

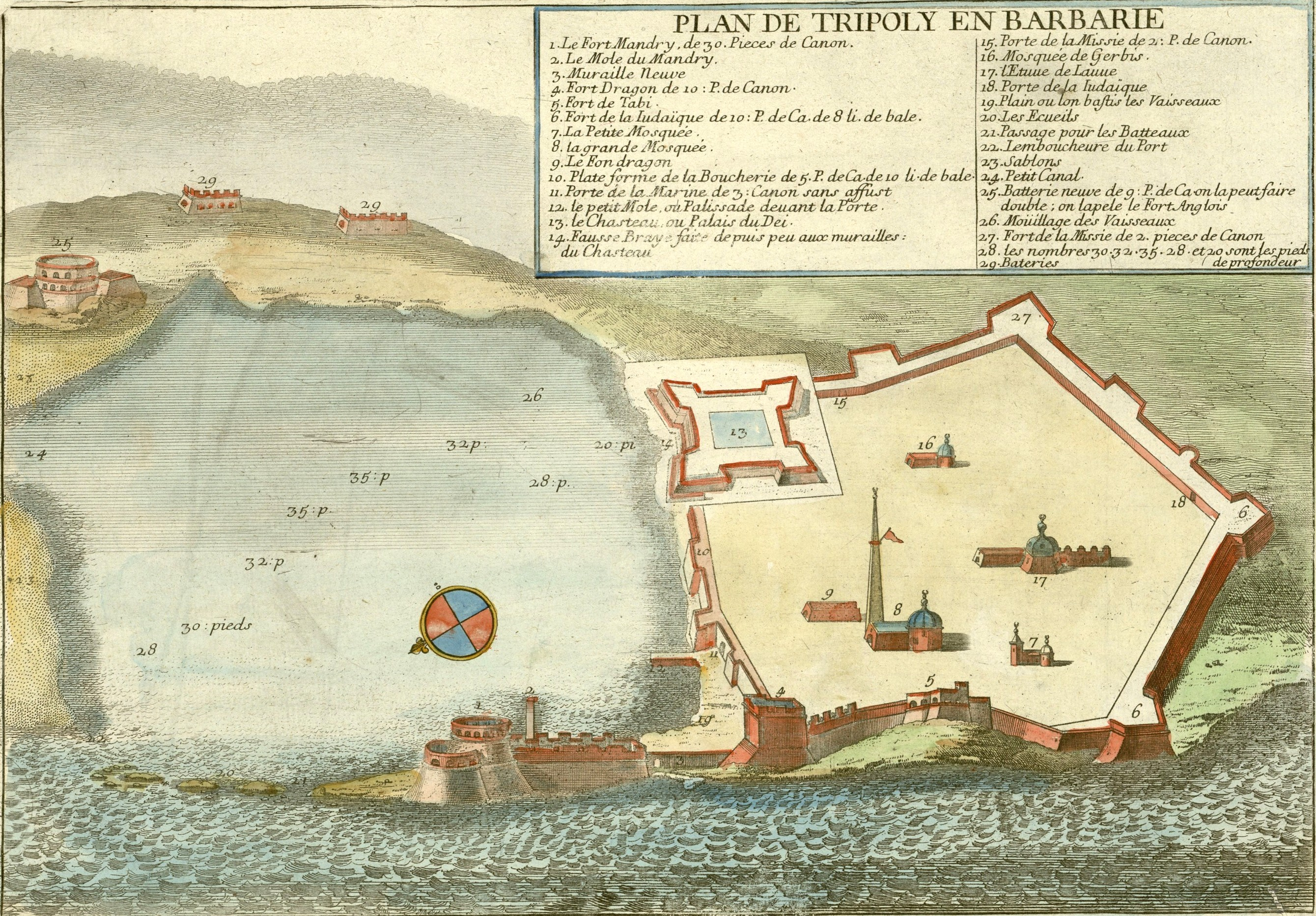
View of Tripoli by Nicolas de Fer, before 1705.

Gaspar de Vallier was a Marshall of the Knights of Malta, who was in command of the fortress of Tripoli during the Siege of Tripoli (1551). He was French, from the region of Auvergne ("Langue d'Auvergne"). In Tripoli, he commanded 30 knights and 630 Calabrian and Sicilian mercenaries. The city was captured on 15 August 1551.

Upon his return to Malta, Gaspar de Vallier was heavily criticized by the Grand Master de Homedes, brought in front of a tribunal, and stripped from the habit and cross of the Order.

De Vallier was later rehabilitated by Grand Master Jean Parisot de Valette.

Preceded by Pedro Nuñez de Herrera	Governor of Tripoli; 1551	Succeeded by Murad Agha (as Pasha of Tripoli)
