= Governor of Tripoli =

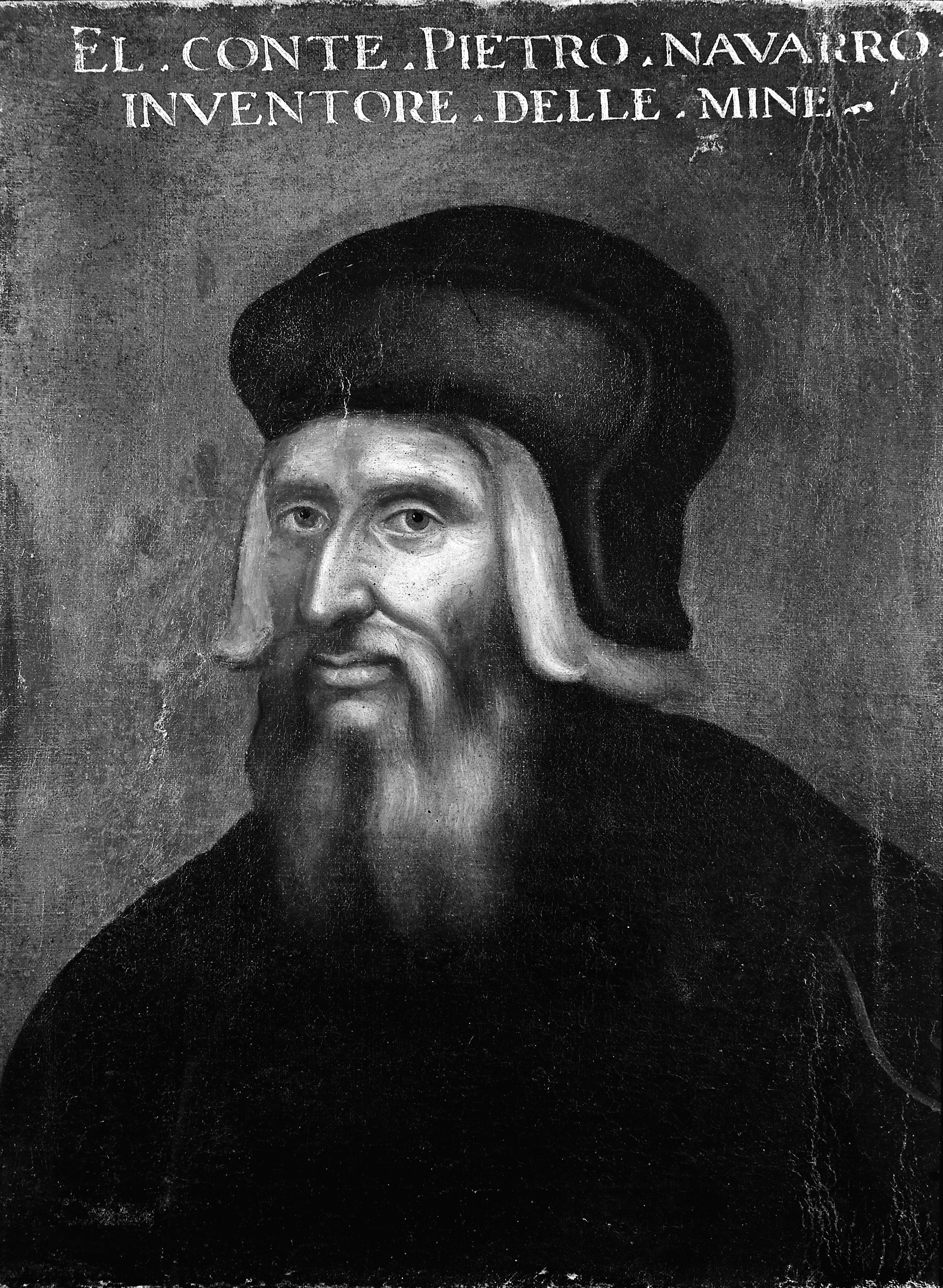
- First Governor; Pedro Navarro; 1510
- Seat: Tripoli
- Formation: 26 July 1510
- First holder: Pedro Navarro
- Final holder: Gaspard de Vallier
- Abolished: 15 August 1551
- Succession: Ottoman Beylerbeyleri of Tripoli

The Governor of Tripoli was an official who was responsible for the administration of Tripoli in the first half of the 16th century, when the city was under Spanish and later Hospitaller rule.

== List ==
=== Spanish governors ===
| Governor | Took office | Left office |
|---|---|---|
| Pedro Navarro (c. 1460–1528) | 26 July 1510 | 1510 |
| Diego de Vera | 1510 | 1510 |
| Jayme de Requesens | 1510 | 1511 |
| Guillem de Moncada | 1511 | 1520 |
| François Velasquès | ? | 25 July 1530 |

=== Hospitaller governors ===
| Governor | Took office | Left office |
|---|---|---|
| Gaspare de Sanguessa | 1530 | 1531 |
| Bernardino Macado (acting) | 1531 | 1532 |
| Aurelio Bottigella (1st term) (1480–1550) | 1532 | 1533 |
| García Cortés | 1533 | 1535 |
| Georg Schilling von Cannstatt (c. 1490–1554) | 1535 | 1537 |
| Aurelio Bottigella (2nd term) (1480–1550) | 1537 | 1539 |
| Hernando de Bracamonte | 1539 | 1544 |
| Cristofano de Solís Farfan | 1544 | 1546 |
| Jean de Valette (1495–1568) | 1546 | 1549 |
| Pedro Nuñez de Herrera | 1549 | 1551 |
| Gaspard de Vallier | April 1551 | 14 August 1551 |

== See also ==
- Pasha of Tripoli
