= Tribute of the Maltese Falcon =

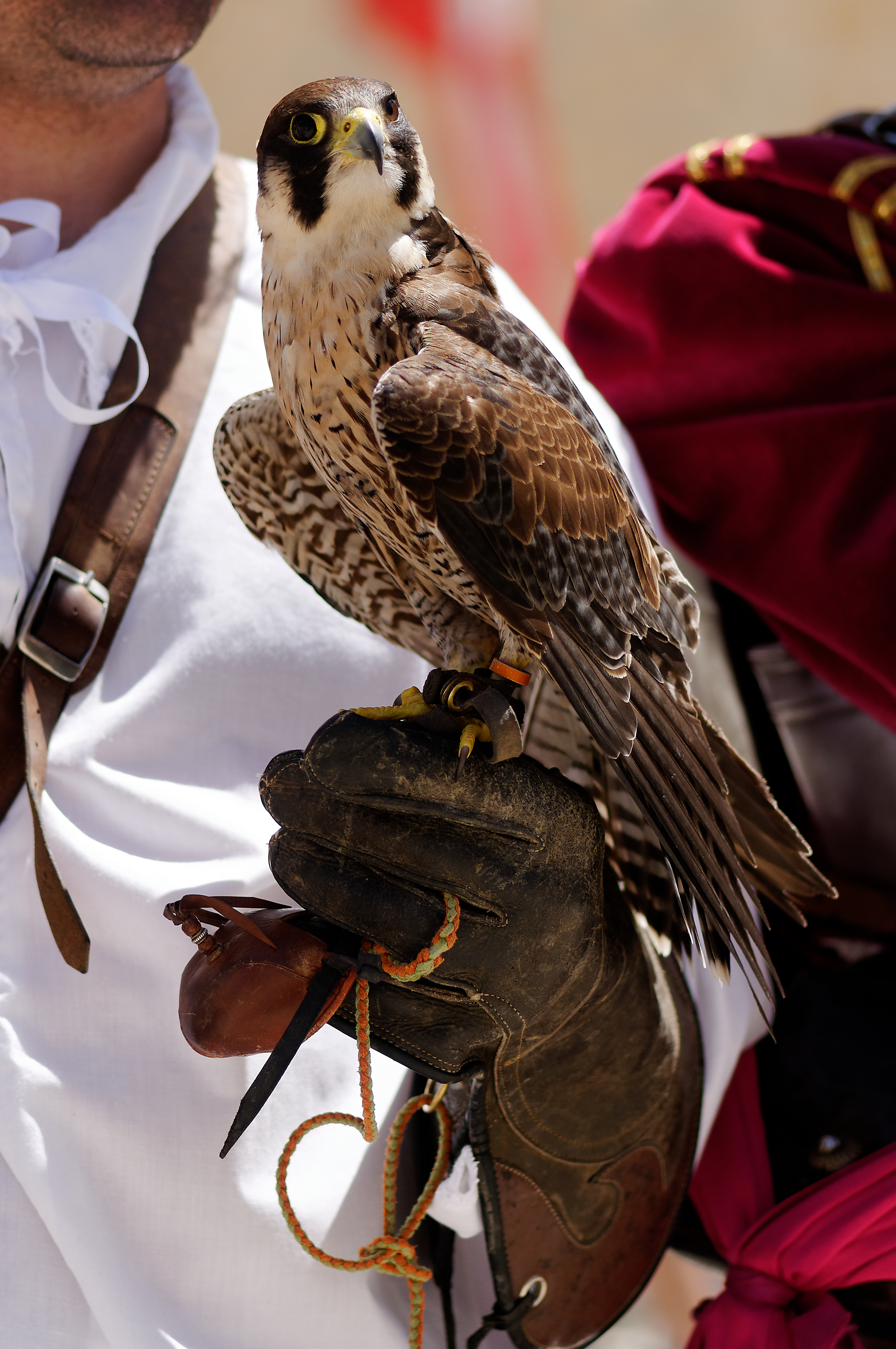
Peregrine falcon in Malta

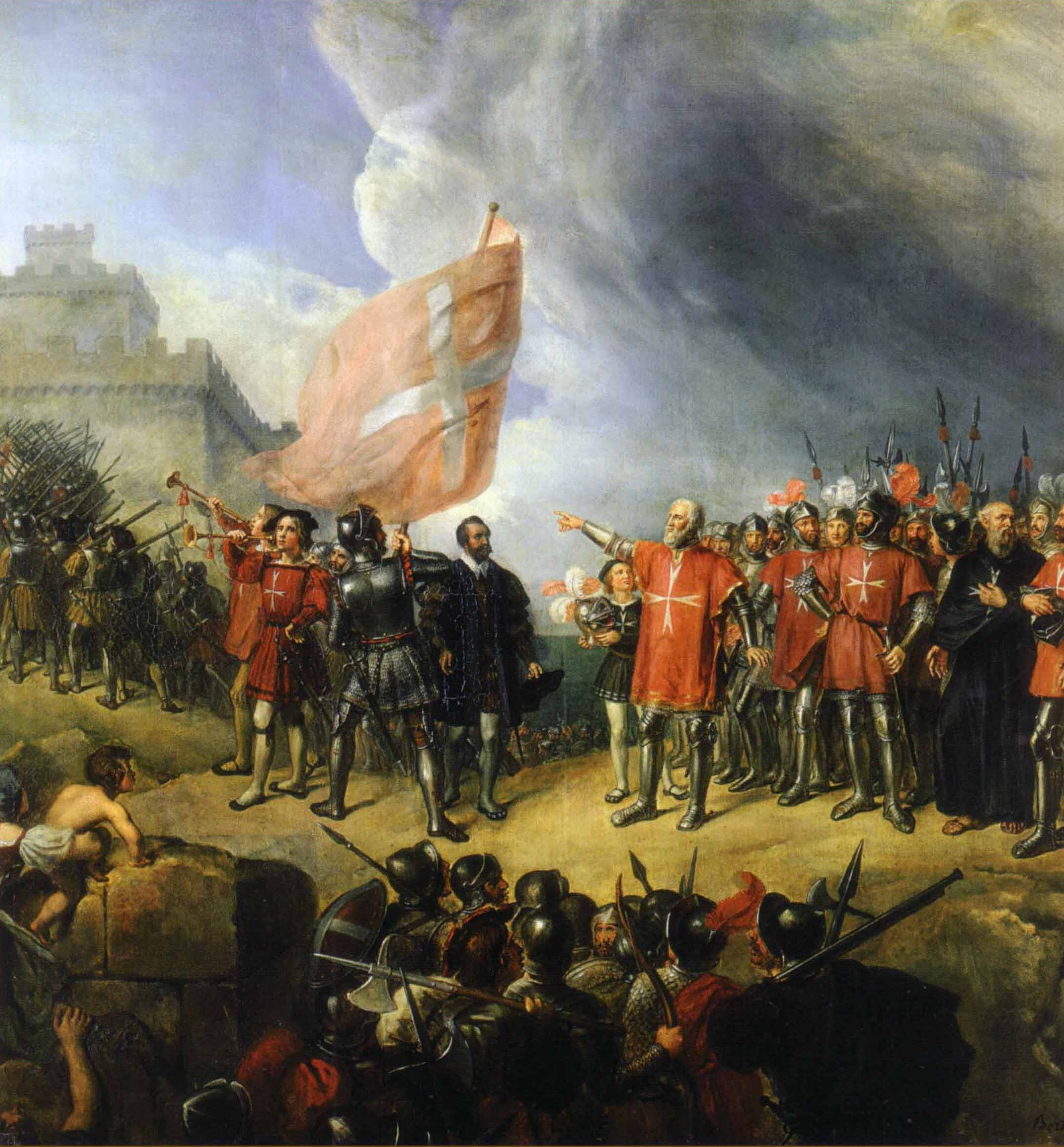
Philippe de Villiers de l'Isle Adam takes possession of the island of Malta, 26 October 1530 by René Théodore Berthon.

The Grand Master of the Order of St John of Jerusalem had to pay an annual tribute to the Emperor Charles V and his mother Queen Joanna of Castile as monarchs of Sicily, for the granting of Tripoli, Malta, and Gozo. There were also other conditions. The annual tribute payable on All Saints day (1 November) was one falcon. The grant was made at Castelfranco Emilia and is dated "the 23rd day of the month of March, Third Indiction, in the Year of Our Lord 1530; in the 10th year of our reign as Emperor, the 27th as King of Castile, Granada etc., the 16th of Navarre, the 15th of Aragon, the Two Sicilies, Jerusalem and all our other realms".

== Text of the grant ==
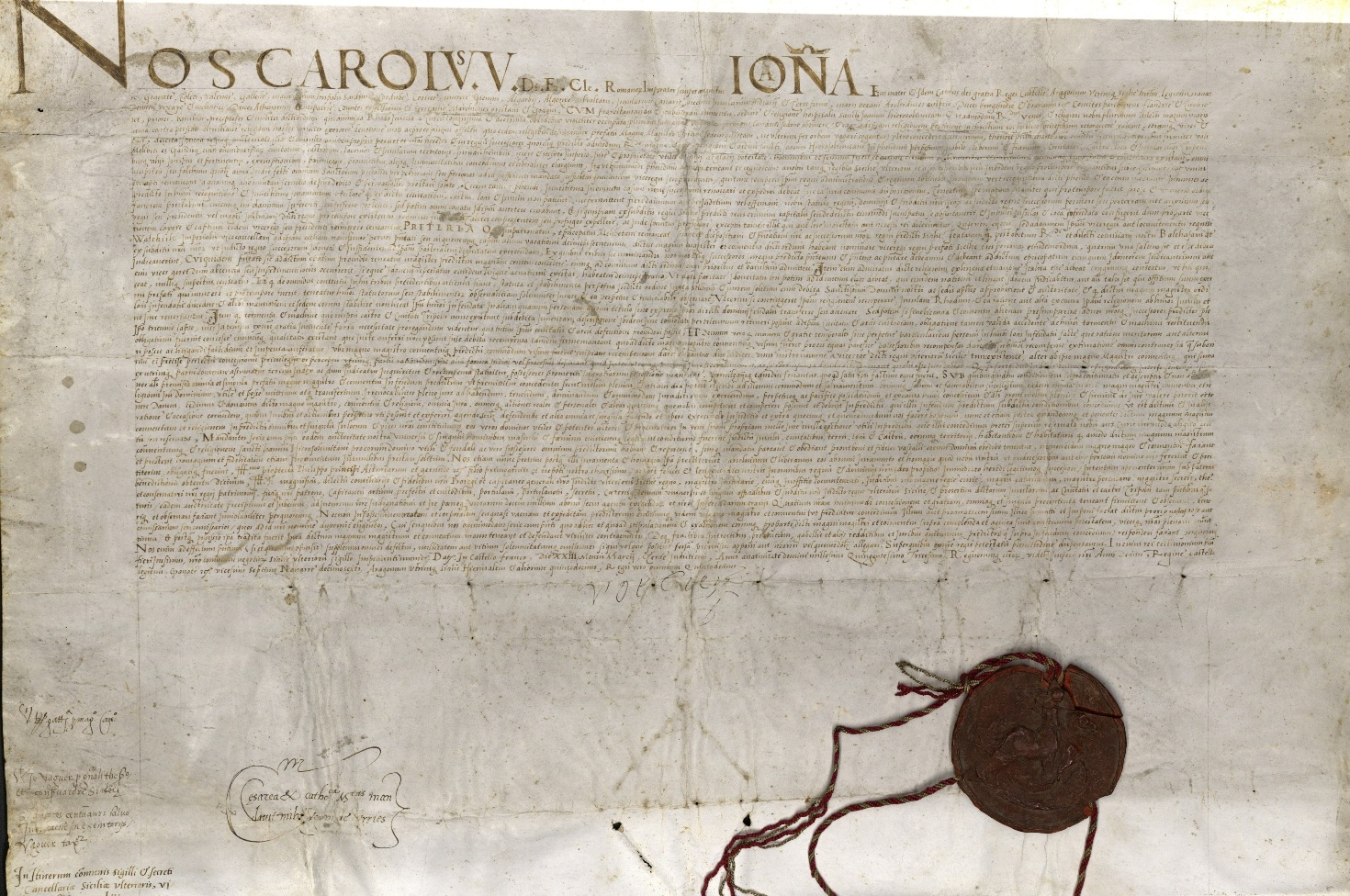
Deed of Donation of the islands of Malta, Gozo and Tripoli to the Order of St John by Emperor Charles V in 1530

The grant says:

[W]e grant, and of our liberality we bountifully bestow upon the aforesaid Very Reverend Grand Master of the Religion and Order of Saint John of Jerusalem, in feudal perpetuity, noble, free and unencumbered, our cities, castles, places and islands of Tripoli, Malta and Gozo, with all their cities, castles, places and island territories; with pure and mixed jurisdiction, right, and property of useful government; with power of life and death over males and females residing within their limits, and with the laws, constitutions, and rights now existing amongst the inhabitants; together with all other laws and rights, exemptions, privileges, revenues and other immunities whatsoever; so that they may hereafter hold them in feudal tenure from us, as Kings of both Sicilies, and from our successors in the same kingdom, reigning at the time, under the sole payment of a falcon; which every year, on the Feast of All Saints, shall be presented by the person or persons duly authorised for that purpose, into the hands of the Viceroy or President, who may at that time be administering the government, in sign and recognition of feudal tenure; and having made that payment, they shall remain exempt and free from all other service claimable by law, and by custom performed by feudal vassals.

== Conditions ==
The investiture had to be renewed in every case of a new succession, and completed according to the dispositions of common law. Other conditions included:

1. Non-aggression against Sicily;
2. No immunity to fugitives of justice;
3. Nomination of bishop of Malta;
4. Appointment of bishop as Grand Cross and membership of the Order's Council;
5. Preference to appoint an Italian as Admiral of the Order;
6. Prohibition of transferability of the fief;
7. Arbitration in case of dispute;
8. Under whatsoever laws or conditions they may have in favour of the people already residing there;

The order and grand master paid the annual falcon until 1798 when the Order was expelled from the Maltese islands by the French Directory.

== In popular culture ==
The Knights of Malta's tribute of a falcon is referred to in the 1930 Dashiell Hammett novel The Maltese Falcon, as well as in the 1931 and 1941 film adaptations.
