= Jean Parisot de Valette =

16th-century French nobleman and military leader

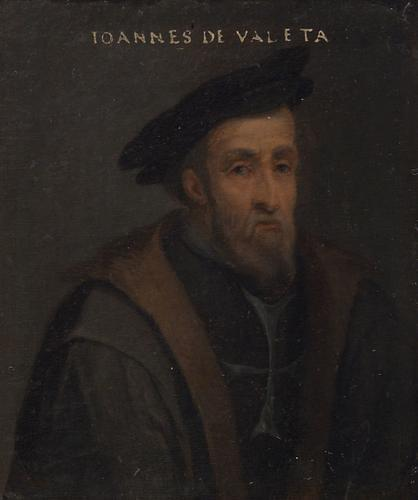

Grand Master of the Order of Saint John
- In office 21 August 1557 – 21 August 1568
- Monarch: Philip II of Spain
- Preceded by: Claude de la Sengle
- Succeeded by: Pierre de Monte

Governor of Tripoli
- In office 1546–1549
- Appointed by: Juan de Homedes y Coscon
- Preceded by: Cristofano de Solís Farfan
- Succeeded by: Pedro Nuñez de Herrera

Personal details
- Born: 4 February 1495 Parisot, Rouergue, France
- Died: 21 August 1568 (aged 73) Hospitaller Malta
- Resting place: St. John's Co-Cathedral (originally buried at the Church of Our Lady of Victories)
- Domestic partner(s): Catherine Grecque and other mistresses
- Children: Barthélemy de Valette; Isabella Guasconi possibly other illegitimate children

Military service
- Allegiance: (Sovereign Military Order of Malta) Order of Saint John
- Years of service: 1514–1568
- Rank: Captain General of the Galleys (1554–1557); Grand Master (1557–1568)
- Battles/wars: Siege of Rhodes; Great Siege of Malta

Fra' Jean "Parisot" de (la) Valette (Note: His official name was Jean de Valette, while "Parisot" was a commonly used nickname. He is often referred to as "Jean de La Valette" but he never actually used the "la" during his lifetime (although members of the Valette family used both versions at the time).) (French pronunciation: [ʒɑ̃ paʁizo d(ə) (la) valɛt]; c. 4 February 1495 – 21 August 1568) was a French nobleman and 49th Grand Master of the Order of Malta, from 21 August 1557 to his death in 1568. As a Knight Hospitaller, joining the order in the Langue de Provence, he fought with distinction against the Turks at Rhodes. As Grand Master, Valette became the Order's hero and most illustrious leader, commanding the resistance against the Ottomans at the Great Siege of Malta in 1565, sometimes regarded as one of the greatest sieges of all time.

The foundation stone of Valletta was laid by Grandmaster La Valette in 1566. He did not live to see Valletta completed, as he died in 1568 and was succeeded by Grandmaster Pierre de Monte.

== Early life ==
He was born into the noble La Valette family in Quercy, South-western France, which had been an important family in France for many generations, various members having participated in the Crusades. Jean Parisot's grandfather, Bernard de La Valette, was a Knight and King's Orderly, and his father Guillot was a Chevalier de France. Jean Parisot was a distant cousin (through their mutual ancestor Almaric, Seigneur de Parisot) of Jean Louis de Nogaret de La Valette, first Duke of Épernon.

Although his birth year is usually given as 1494, both chroniclers of the Great Siege of Malta, Francisco Balbi di Correggio and Hipolito Sans, say he was 67 at the time, thereby implying that he was born in 1498. In his history of the Order of St. John, the 18th-century historian Abbe Vertot (whose history is largely based on - but often contradicted - the earlier one of Giacomo Bosio) indicates that La Valette was indeed the same age as both Suleiman I and Kızılahmedli Mustafa Pasha (the commander of the Ottoman land forces), which would mean that he was actually 70 years old at the time of the siege.

== Early career and rise within the Order ==
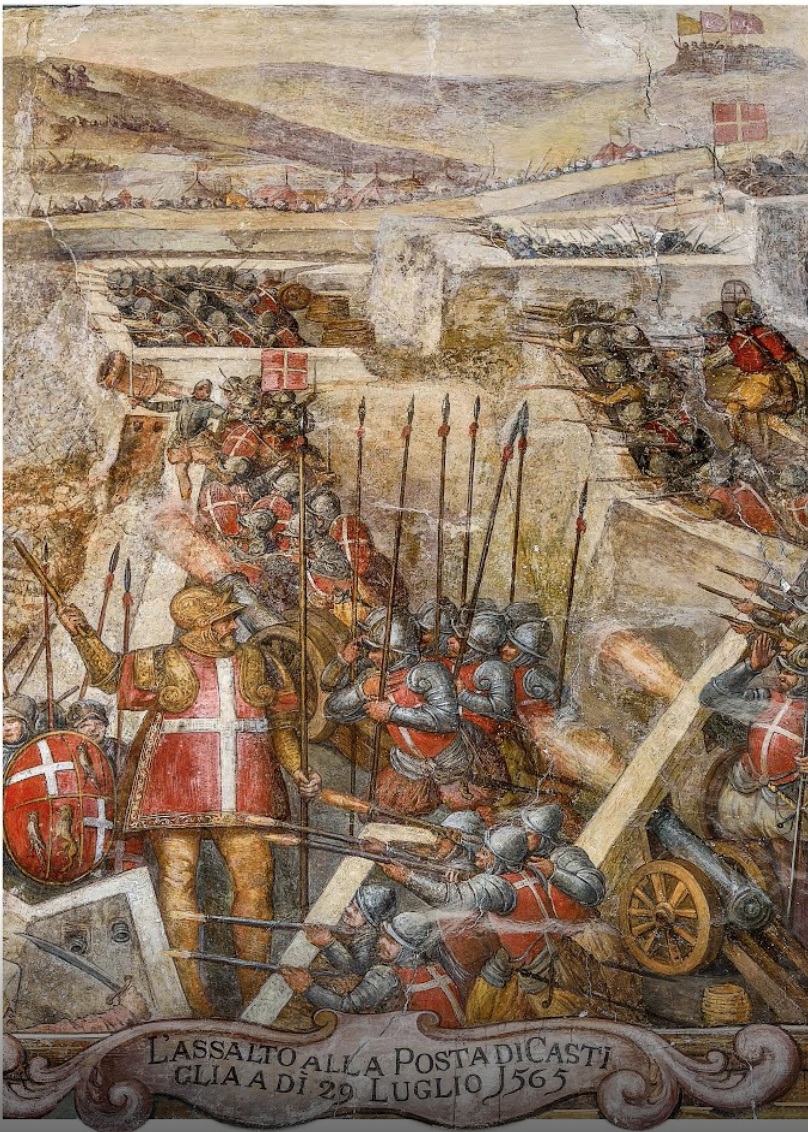
16th century wall painting of the Great Siege of Malta in the Grandmaster's Palace, Valletta

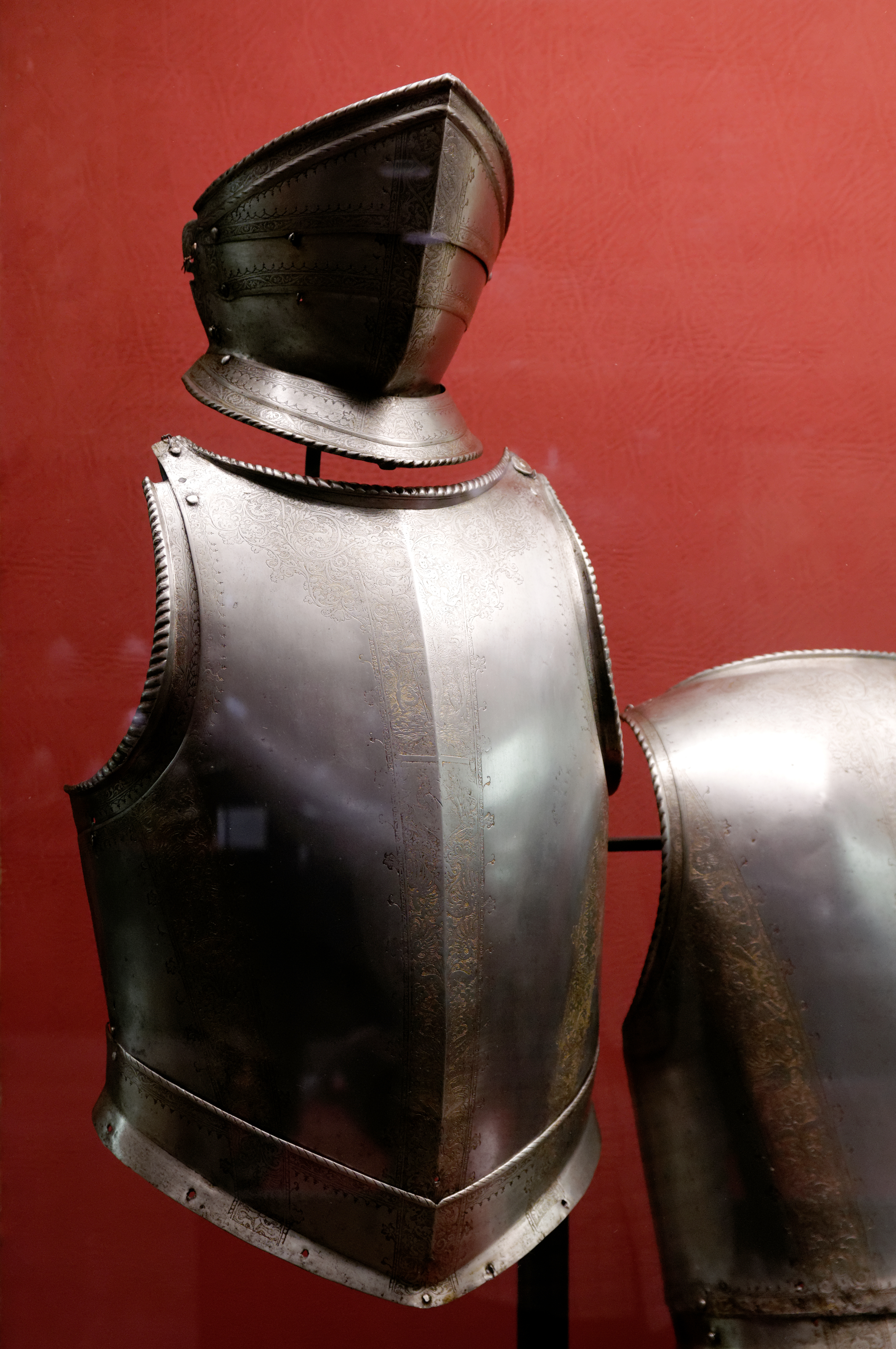
La Valette's armour at the Palace Armoury.

La Valette joined the Order when he was 20 years old in around 1514, and he never returned to France or his family estates from that day on. He was present during the Great Siege of Rhodes in 1522, and accompanied Grand Master Philippe Villiers de L'Isle-Adam, after the Order's expulsion from Rhodes by the Ottoman Turks under Sultan Suleiman the Magnificent.

After the loss of Rhodes, the Order was granted the Maltese Islands and Tripoli by Emperor Charles V. In 1538, he was imprisoned in the Gozo prison for four months after attacking a man. In 1541, La Valette was involved in a naval battle against Abd-ur-Rahman Kust Aly, in which he was wounded and his galley, the San Giovanni, was captured. La Valette was taken as a galley slave for a year by Barbary pirates under the command of Turgut Reis but was later freed during an exchange of prisoners. In 1546, La Valette became Governor of Tripoli, where he tried to restore order within the vulnerable city.

In 1554, he was elected Captain General of the Order's galleys.

== Grandmastership ==
Coat of arms of La Valette as Grandmaster

In 1557, upon the death of Grand Master Claude de la Sengle, the Knights, mindful of the attack that was sure to come, elected La Valette to be Grand Master. In 1560 he formed an alliance with the Habsburg Empire to reconquer Tripoli, but the expedition resulted in a Christian defeat at the Battle of Djerba. Despite this the Order's galleys were able to rescue several other Christian vessels, and later on in his reign, La Valette greatly strengthened the Order's navy.

=== Great Siege of Malta ===
He organised the defence of Malta, fought during the siege, and successfully repulsed the Turks at the Great Siege of Malta in 1565. During the siege the vastly outnumbered Christians held out for over 3 months against an Ottoman force containing no less than 30,000 soldiers, including the Janissaries, as well as the Sultan's fleet of some 193 ships. The battle saw the fall of Fort St. Elmo after about a month of fierce fighting, but the Order managed to hold out in Birgu and Senglea until a relief force arrived. Ottoman specialist engineers had originally assessed the fortification of Saint Elmo, from local informants and conducting reconnoitring missions, saying it would fall in three days.

Knight Commander Le Sande, who had sailed from Sicily with reinforcements, ordered a general charge from the Maltese hills toward the end of the siege. They attacked the Ottoman forces until the Ottoman forces retreated to the sea, and at that point the sea had completely changed colour to red (from the sheer volume of blood lost). It was at that point the Ottoman forces boarded their ships, directed their course back to Constantinople. Whilst shaping course back to Constantinople they momentarily contemplated counterattacking. However, they had lost too many men, supplies, and the morale at that point to launch any substantial counterattack.

During the first days after the siege a Maltese soldier sitting around a campfire at night began to frame the words of a song which would later become famous in the Mediterranean:

Malta of gold, Malta of silver, Malta of precious metal,
We shall never take you.
No, not even if you were as soft as a gourd,
Not even if you were only protected by an onion skin!

And from her ramparts a voice replied:

I am she who has decimated the galleys of the Turk -
And all the warriors of Constantinople and Galatia!

As a result of the Order's victory La Valette gained much prestige in Europe, but he declined the offer of a cardinal's hat in order to maintain independence from the papacy. This has been attributed to his sense of modesty and his humility as a warrior monk.

== Building of Valletta and death ==
After the great siege, he commissioned the construction of the new city of Valletta in 1566, laying the first stone with his own hands. This took place on the slopes of Mount Sciberras, where the flower of the Turkish army had died whilst trying to storm Fort Saint Elmo, which the Turks thought would fall within three or four days, but which, due to the bravery of the defenders, held out for 30 days.

The city named after its founder - Humilissima Civitas Vallettae - became known as the most aristocratic and exclusive fortress in Europe - a city most often referred to as "Superbissima" - the "Most Proud". Valletta remains the Maltese capital to this day.

La Valette suffered a stroke while praying in a chapel and died soon after on 21 August 1568, exactly eleven years after he became Grandmaster. La Valette never saw the completed city of Valletta. His tomb (in the form of a sarcophagus) can be found in the Crypt of the Conventual Church of the Order (now St. John's Co-Cathedral), situated within the walls of Valletta. The inscription on his tomb, which was composed by his Latin Secretary, Sir Oliver Starkey, the last Knight of the English Langue at the time of the Great Siege, states in Latin:

Here lies La Valette.
Worthy of eternal honour,
He who was once the scourge of Africa and Asia,
And the shield of Europe,
Whence he expelled the barbarians by his Holy Arms,
Is the first to be buried in this beloved city,
Whose founder he was.

== Personal life ==
La Valette has been referred to as one who never broke his vows, but it has been claimed that he had a mistress while in Rhodes called Catherine nicknamed Greque (Greek), and that he had an illegitimate son from her who was called Barthélemy de La Valette. Documentary evidence has been found by Bonello that proves Barthélemy was legitimatized in 1568 by a decree of King Charles IX of France.

Claims have also been put forth that La Valette had at least another child, Isabella Guasconi, after a presumed affair with the wife of a Rhodiot nobleman of Florentine descent. Isabella later married a Florentine gentleman Stefano Buonaccorsi, but he murdered her on 31 July 1568, sometime after their marriage. After the murder, Buonaccorsi escaped the islands with Isabella's wealth and was never heard from again.

== Legacy ==
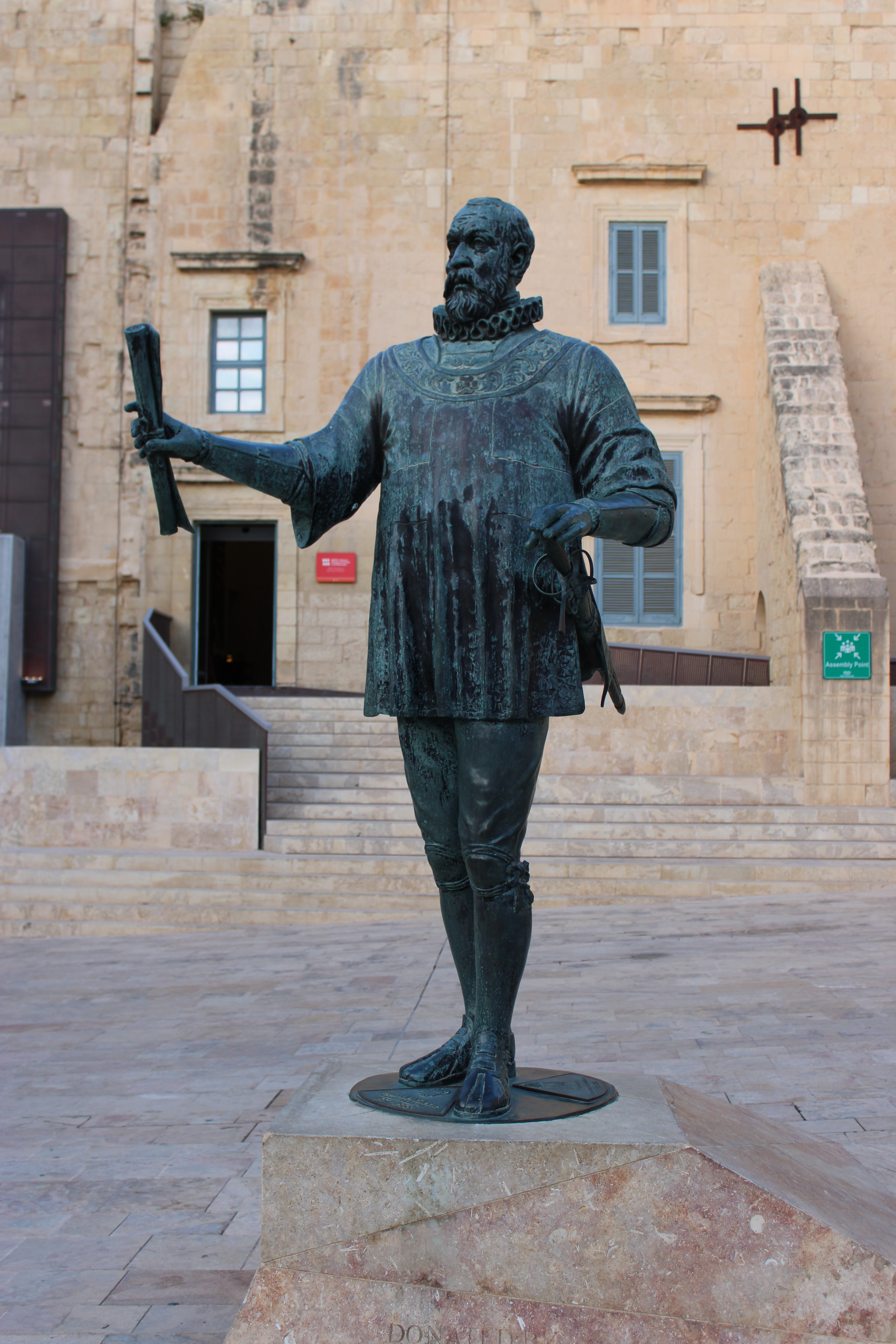
Pjazza Jean de Valette, Valletta.

La Valette is well known for being the Grandmaster who won the Great Siege and founded Valletta. A street in the town of Naxxar as well as the flagship of Virtu Ferries MV Jean de La Valette are both named after him. La Valette was also featured on Maltese stamps, coins, banknotes and telecards a number of times.

=== Jean de Valette Square ===
In 2012, a square was inaugurated in Valletta named Pjazza Jean de La Valette which also features a statue of the Grandmaster. The statue is 2.5m high and was cast in bronze by the local sculptor Joseph Chetcuti. In the statue, La Valette is shown in armour and holding Valletta's plan in one hand and a sword in the other.

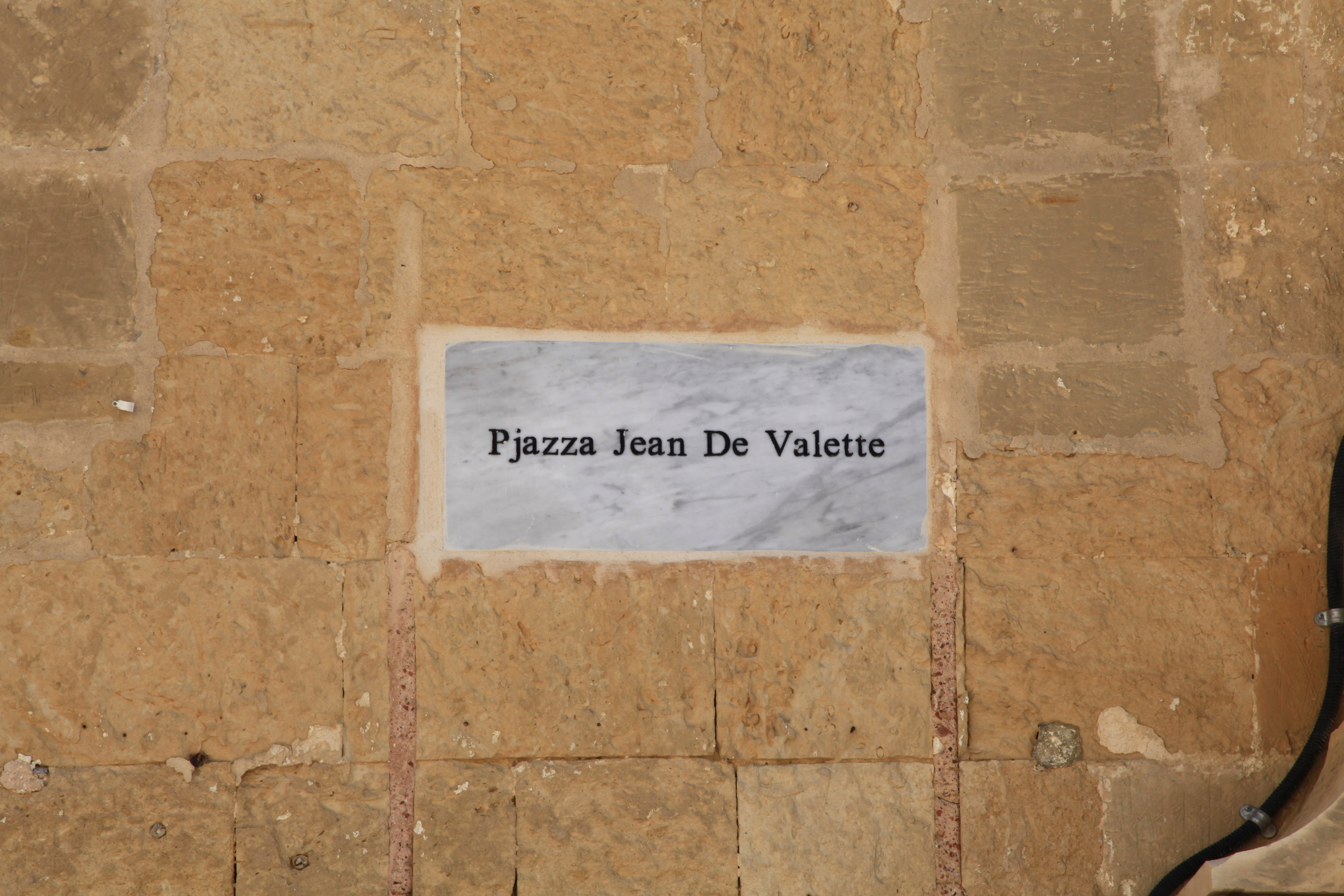
The new square in Valletta named after the Grandmaster uses the name de Valette instead of de La Valette

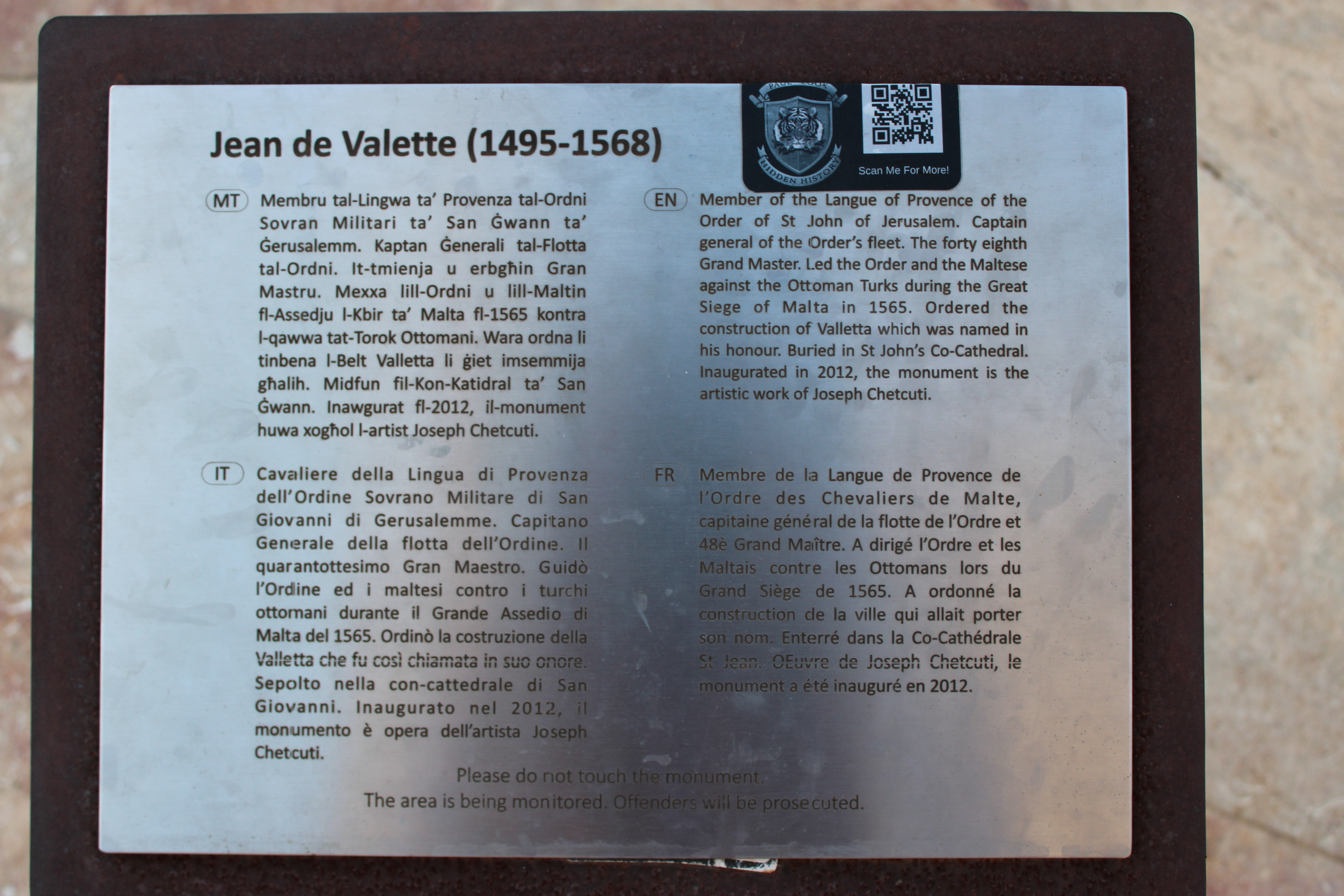
explanation of Piazza de Valette

For many years, the widely accepted version of the Grandmaster's surname was de La Valette. However, during the unveiling of the statue at Pjazza Jean de Valette in November 2012, judge and historian Giovanni Bonello stated that the Grandmaster always signed his name as de Valette without the La. A week later, Désireé von la Valette Saint Georges, a descendant of the Grandmaster, stated that the family name was de la Valette not de Valette and since then, a dispute has started as to what his name actually was.

Members of the various branches of the Valette family actually used both versions at the time, but the Grandmaster himself never used the La. In fact, all 138 coins and 19 medals minted by the Order during de Valette's reign show the names de Valette, de Valetta or just Valette. Bonello additionally stated that the La possibly originated since the city of Valletta was commonly called La Valletta, so people started including the La and sometimes the double l in the Grandmaster's name.

When de Vallette was around 45 years old and already in Malta, Francis I, seeing the wide linguistic disparity in the use of various Romance and Germanic languages in France, enacted the Ordinance of Villers-Cotterêts which prescribed the use of standard French, mostly as spoken in northern France and in the Paris area where the langues d'oui prevailed.

The name de Valette is now used in Malta, although many still refer to him as de La Valette due to the collective memory. The Order's successor, the Sovereign Military Order of Malta, call the Grandmaster Fra' Jean de La Vallette-Parisot.

== In literature ==
Due to his key role in holding Malta during the siege of 1565, de Valette has appeared as a main and supporting character in several works of literature:

- Marthese Fenech's Siege of Malta Trilogy includes Eight-Pointed Cross (2011), Falcon's Shadow (2020), and Ash Fall (2022), and all three novels feature Valette.
- Angels in Iron is a 1997 pseudo-historic novel by Nicholas Prata; de Valette is the main character.
- Ironfire: An Epic Novel of War and Love is a 2005 adventure novel by David Ball. De Valette is a supporting character.
- The Religion: A Novel (2007) – by Tim Willocks; de Valette is a supporting character.
- The Course of Fortune (2015) – by Tony Rothman; de Valette is a supporting character, with the surname "de Valette" and portrayed according to recent historical evidence.
- The Great Siege is a 1961 historic account of the 1565 siege, as drawn from historic documents.
- Πανάκεια (2008) / Panacea, a Greek adventure novel by Παναγιώτης Κονιδάρης. De Valette is a supporting character.

== See also ==
- Great Siege of Malta
- Valletta
- Knights Hospitaller

Preceded by Cristofano de Solís Farfán	Governor of Tripoli; 1546–1549	Succeeded by Pedro Nuñez de Herrera
Preceded by Claude de la Sengle	Grand Master of the Knights Hospitaller; 1557–1568	Succeeded by Pierre de Monte
