= Brucoli Lighthouse =

Brucoli Lighthouse Faro di Brucoli
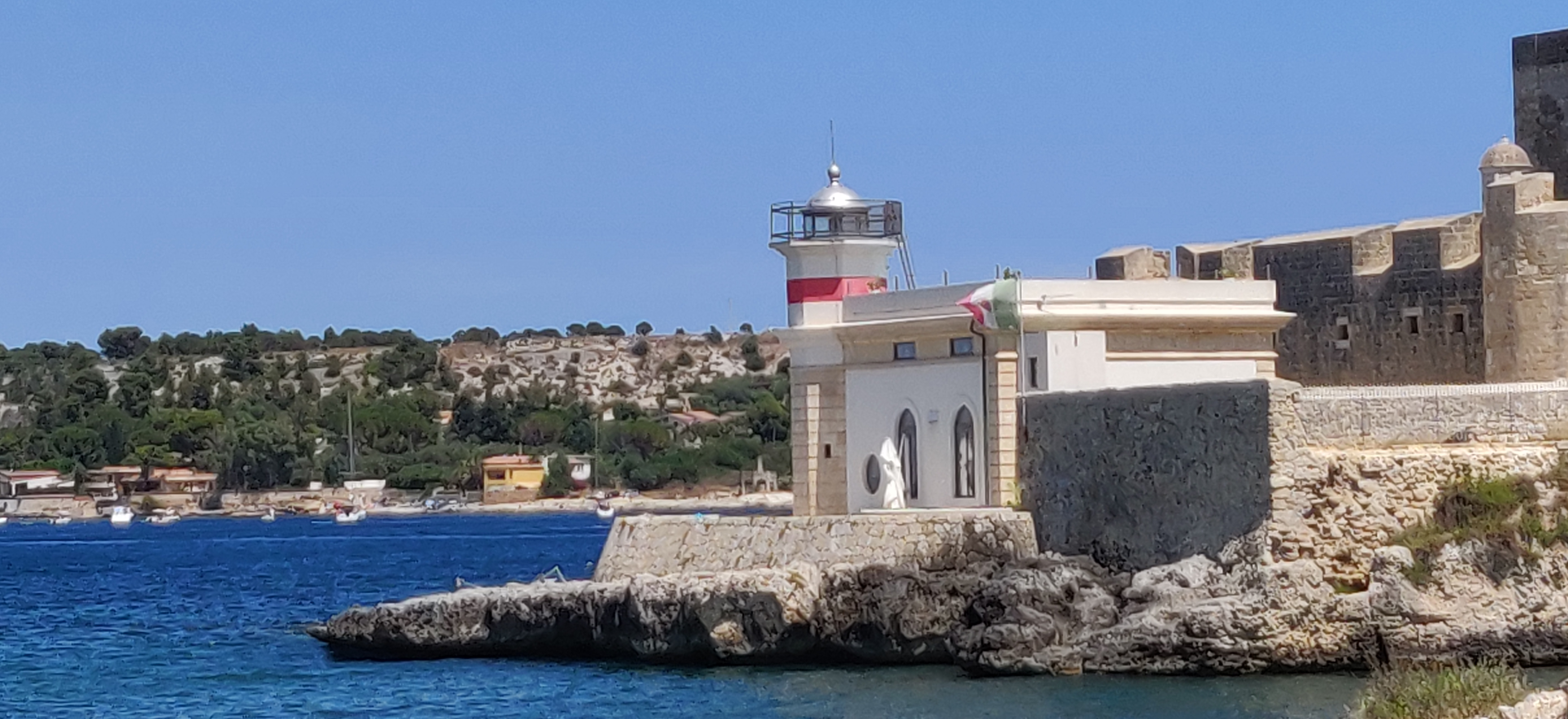
- Location: Brucoli, Augusta, Italy
- Coordinates: 37°17′09″N 15°11′11″E

Tower
- Constructed: 1911
- Construction: concrete (tower)
- Height: 5 m (16 ft)
- Shape: octagonal prism
- Markings: white (tower), stripe (red)
- Operator: Italian Navy

Light
- Focal height: 13 m (43 ft)
- Range: 11 nmi (20 km; 13 mi)
- Characteristic: Fl W 5s

Brucoli Lighthouse (Italian: Faro di Brucoli) is an active lighthouse located in the municipality of Augusta on the eastern coast of Sicily near the southern end of the Gulf of Catania. The lighthouse is also called Faro Antico Castello Regina Giovanna (Queen Juana Ancient Castle Lighthouse), because of its proximity to the castle of Brucoli, built in 15th century by Juana Enriquez, second wife of John II of Aragon.

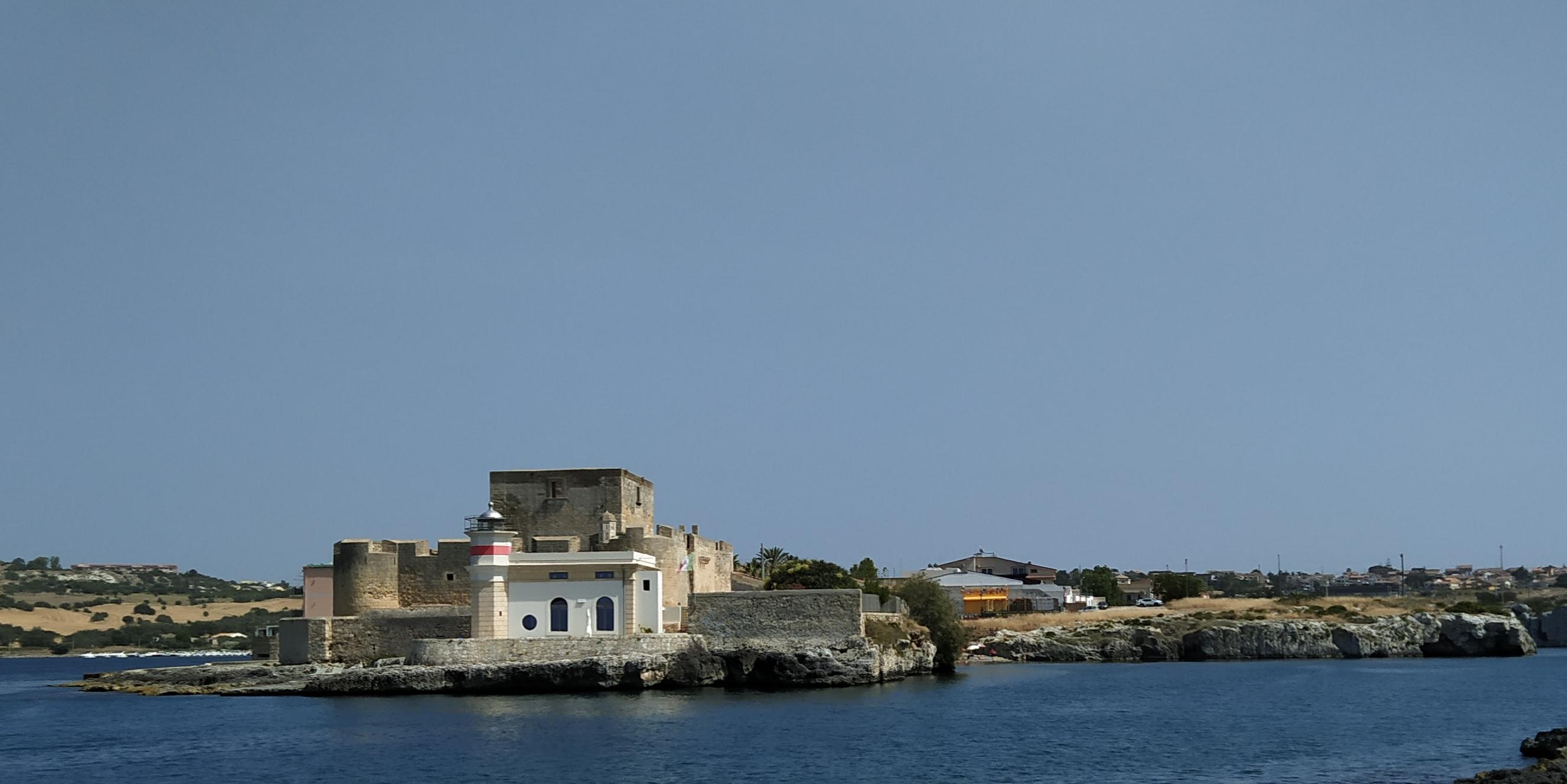
The lighthouse and the castle

Activated in 1911 and subsequently electrified, it consists of a white tower with a red band and an adjacent building.

In 2017 the Agenzia del Demanio leased the unused service building for 50 years to a local company, which converted it into an accommodation facility.
