= Porta di Terra =

Porta di Terra (Italian for Land Gate) may refer to the following city gates:

- City Gate, Valletta, Malta
- Porta Spagnola, Augusta, Sicily
