= Fort Saint Michael =

Small fort in Senglea, Malta

- Forti San Mikiel
- Part of the fortifications of Senglea
- Senglea, Malta
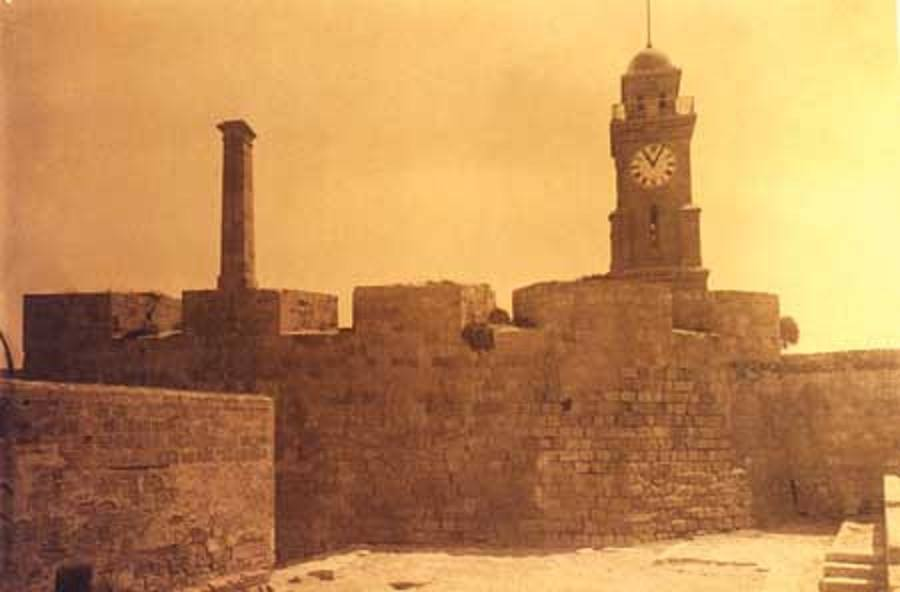
- St Michael Cavalier shortly before its demolition

Site information
- Type: Cavalier
- Owner: Government of Malta
- Condition: Part of base survives

Location
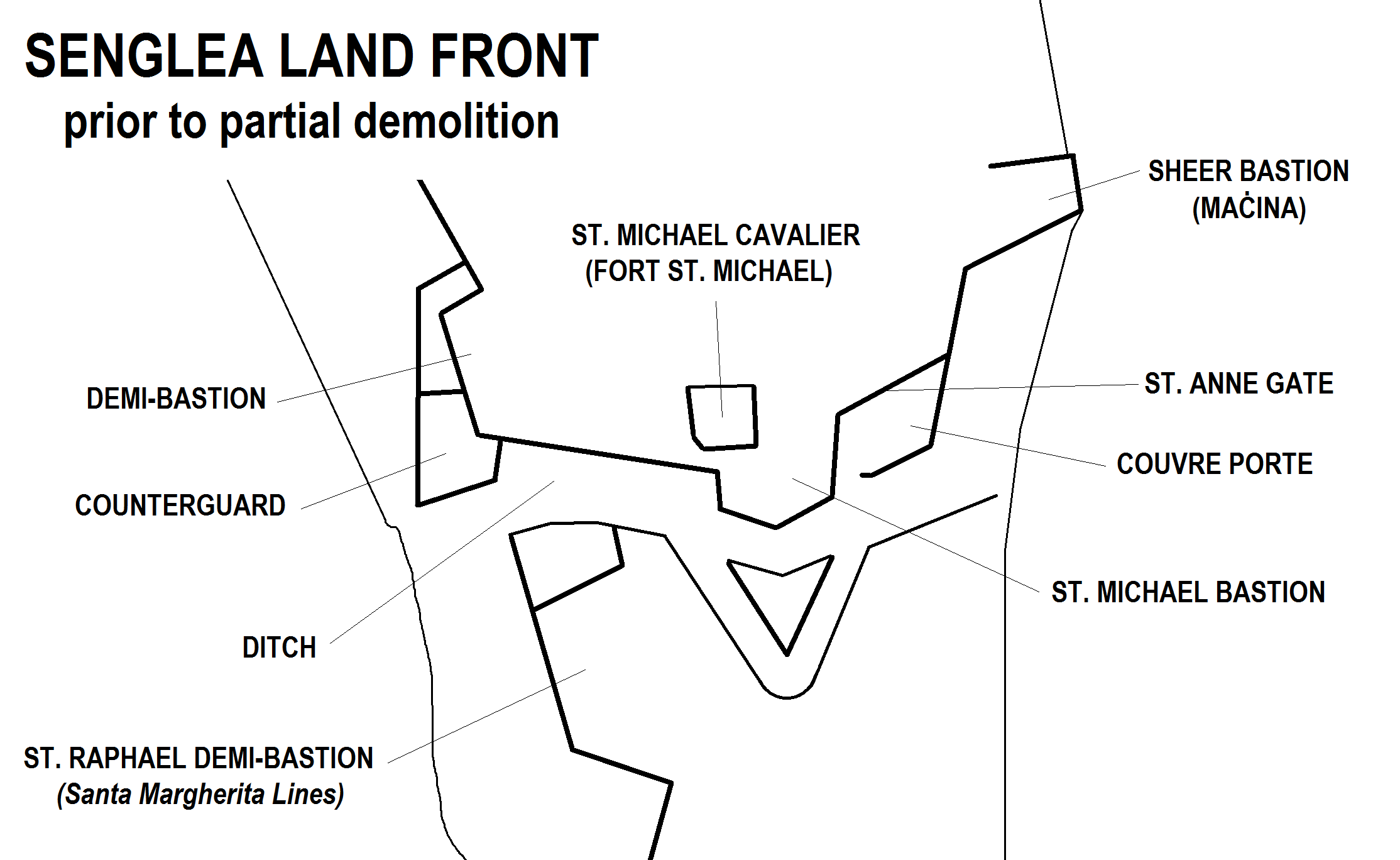
- Map of Senglea's land front, showing the location of Fort St. Michael
- Coordinates: 35°53′4.7″N 14°31′7.5″E

Site history
- Built: 1552–1581
- Built by: Order of Saint John
- Architect: Pedro Fardo
- Materials: Limestone
- Fate: Partially demolished, 1921
- Battles/wars: Great Siege of Malta

Garrison information
- Past commanders: Pierre de Monte (1565)

Fort Saint Michael (Maltese: Forti San Mikiel) was a small fort in the land front of the city of Senglea, Malta. It was originally built in the 1552 and played a significant role in the Great Siege of Malta of 1565. Following the siege, it was rebuilt as Saint Michael Cavalier (Maltese: Kavallier ta' San Mikiel), and was completed in 1581. The cavalier was partially demolished in the 20th century, and only a part of its base remains today.

== Construction and history ==
In 1537 d’Homedes renovated a villa and surrounded it with a casemate.

In 1551, the Ottomans attacked Malta and later invaded Gozo. This prompted the Order's Grand Master, Juan de Homedes y Coscon, to strengthen the defences of the island. Two new forts were needed, one on the Sciberras Peninsula, and one on the smaller peninsula then known as Isola di San Michele, which was formed by Dockyard Creek and French Creek in Grand Harbour.

The first stone of the fort on l'Isola was laid on 8 May 1552 by de Homedes himself. Fort Saint Michael was built to a design by the military engineer Pedro Pardo d’Andrera. The second fort, located on the Sciberras Peninsula, was called Fort Saint Elmo. Both new forts were built in the remarkably short period of six months in 1552.

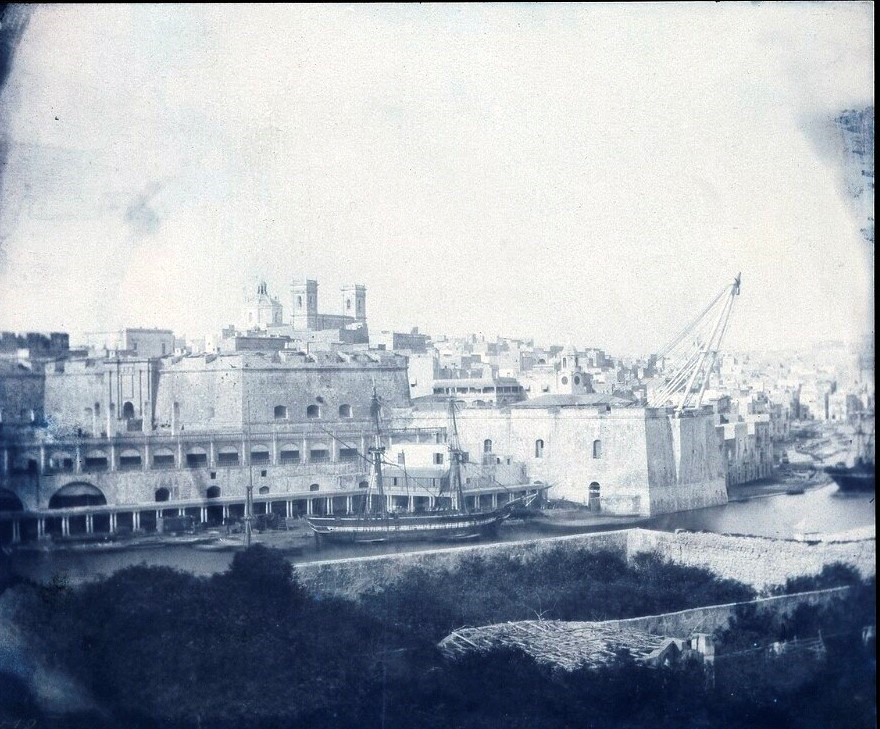
Photo of the Senglea land front in 1846, with St Michael Cavalier partially visible at the extreme left

Fort Saint Michael was extended to a fortified city named Senglea by Grand Master Claude de la Sengle during the Knights' preparations for the anticipated Great Siege of Malta. The siege eventually came in 1565, and St Michael was one of three forts defending the Knights stronghold in Grand Harbour, along with Fort St Angelo and Fort St Elmo. The latter fell, but Fort St Michael and Fort St Angelo both withstood the siege. Fort St Michael was severely damaged, as it had been the scene of some of the most desperate fighting and bombardment of the siege. It withstood 10 assaults from the Ottoman attackers.

The fortifications of Senglea was rebuilt after the siege, and the redevelopment continued until 1581. Fort St. Michael was converted to a cavalier, consisting of a tower with a casemated interior, which had a terrace platform with ten embrasures.

In 1687, Don Carlos de Grunenbergh visited the fort and recommended the addition of a faussebraye. He decided to finance the expenses himself.

== Destruction ==
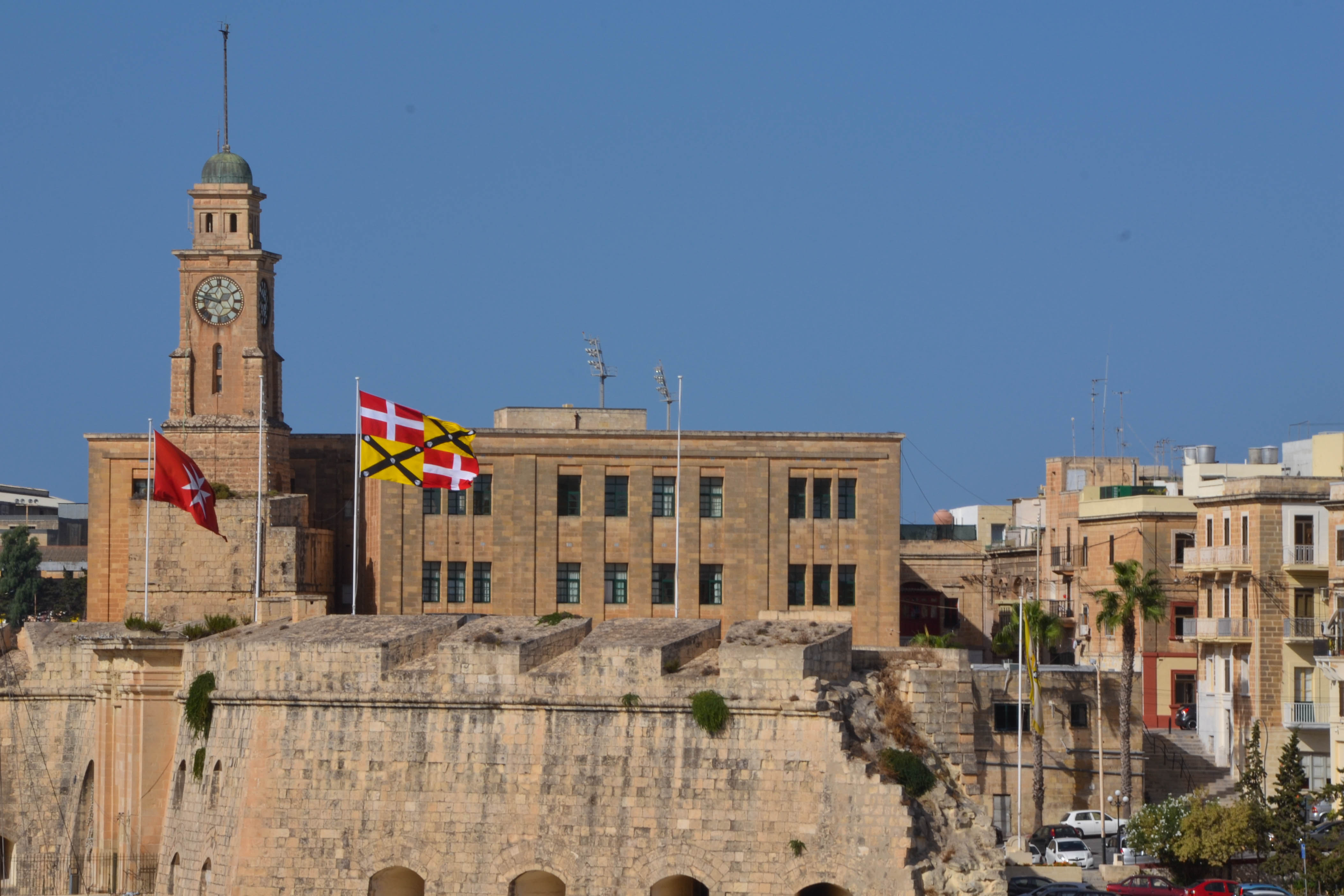
The clock tower and school, with the remains of the cavalier used as the clock tower's base

St. Michael Cavalier was largely dismantled in 1921 to make way for a school. A small part of the structure's lower section was retained and was used as the base of a clock tower.

Today, the bastion at Senglea Point, which is known as "the Spur", is often mistakenly referred to as Fort Saint Michael, although the fort was actually located at the opposite end of the city.
