= Capo Santa Croce Lighthouse =

Lighthouse in Augusta, Sicily, Italy

Capo Santa Croce
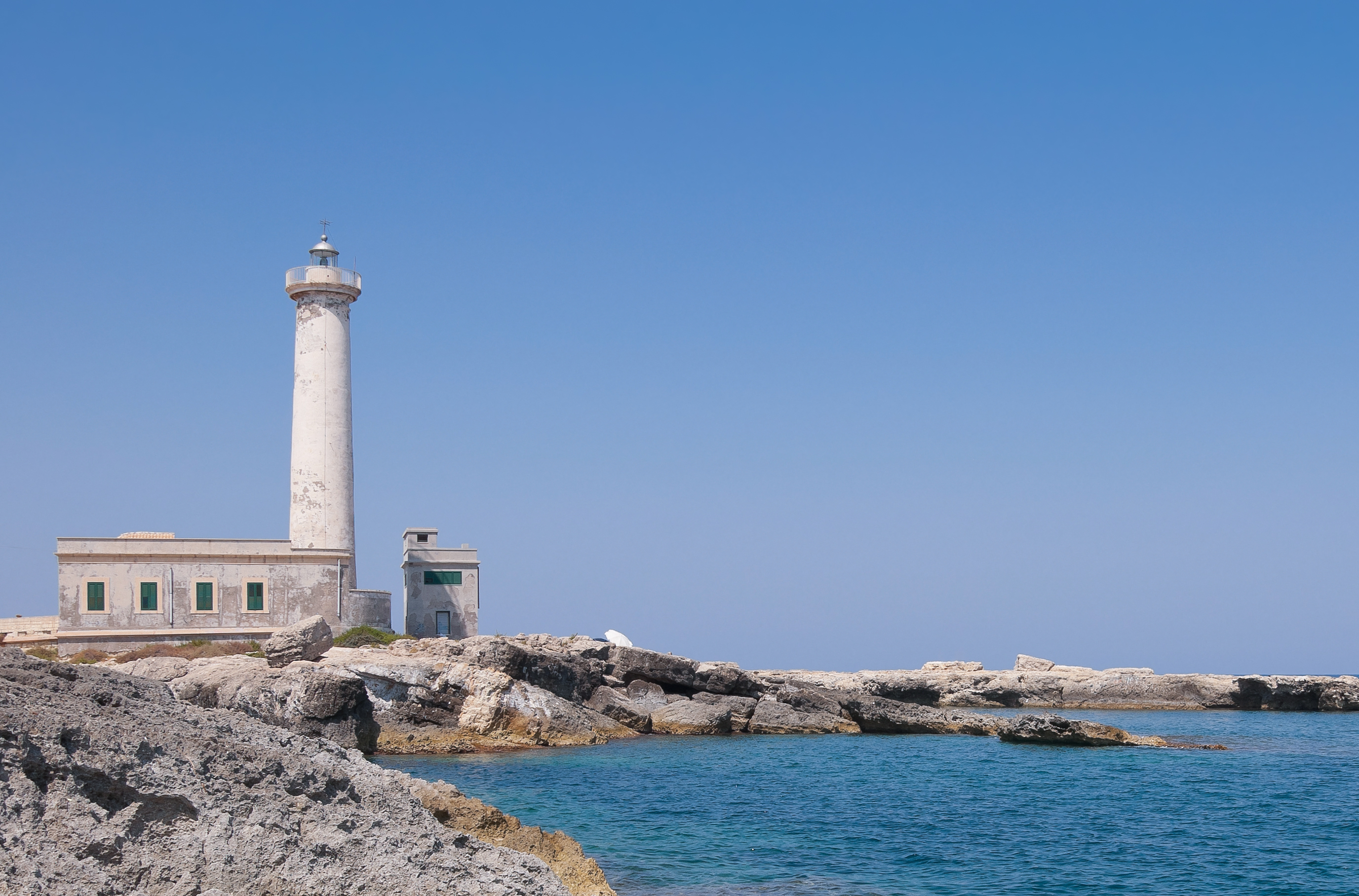
- Capo Santa Croce Lighthouse
- Location: Capo Santa Croce, a 7,2 km from Capo Campolato; Augusta; Sicily; Italy
- Coordinates: 37°14′36″N 15°15′23″E

Tower
- Constructed: 1859
- Foundation: concrete base
- Construction: limestone tower
- Automated: 1979
- Height: 27 metres (89 ft)
- Shape: cylindrical tower with balcony and lantern attached to 1-storey keeper's house
- Markings: white tower and lantern, grey metallic lantern dome
- Power source: mains electricity
- Operator: Marina Militare

Light
- Focal height: 39 metres (128 ft)
- Lens: Type OF; Focal length: 250mm
- Intensity: main: AL 1000 W reserve: LABI 100 W
- Range: main: 16 nautical miles (30 km; 18 mi) reserve: 10 nautical miles (19 km; 12 mi)
- Characteristic: L Fl (2) W 12s.
- Italy no.: 2820 E.F.

Capo Santa Croce Lighthouse (Italian: Faro di Capo Santa Croce) is an active lighthouse located at the extreme tip of the cape, marking the northern end of the Gulf of Catania in the municipality of Augusta on the Ionian Sea.

== History ==
The lighthouse was built in 1859 under the Borbonic, then with the proclamation of the Kingdom of Italy the structure passed to the Regia Marina. In 1932 the lighthouse underwent to a restoration. During World War II it was a coastal observation point operated by the Regia Marina; in July 1943 when the area was subjected to bombardment by the British, the Italian staff left the lighthouse. At the end of the war the lighthouse turned to the Marina Militare and the keeper Cuomo got his job back until 1979, when he retired and was no longer replaced as the lighthouse was automated.

The keeper's house was abandoned and went in ruin until 1995 when it was renovated and the structure was given as office to the Istituto Scientifico di Ricerca Marina. The Agenzia del Demanio, who run the State ownership buildings including the lighthouses, decided to give it in concession with a request for tenders to a private for 50 years. The lighthouse has been awarded to a company that will invest one million euro for the renovation of the building and transforming it in a Lighthouse guest luxury art Hotel.

== Description ==
The lighthouse consists of a limestone cylindrical tower, 27 metres (89 ft) high, with balcony and lantern attached to the seaward side of 1-storey keeper's house. The tower and the lantern are white; the lantern dome is grey metallic. The light is positioned at 39 metres (128 ft) above sea level and emits two long white flashes in a 12 seconds period visible up to a distance of 16 nautical miles (30 km; 18 mi). The lighthouse is completely automated and managed by the Marina Militare with the identification code number 2820 E.F.

== See also ==
- List of lighthouses in Italy
