= Porta Ligny =

Old entrance of Siracusa

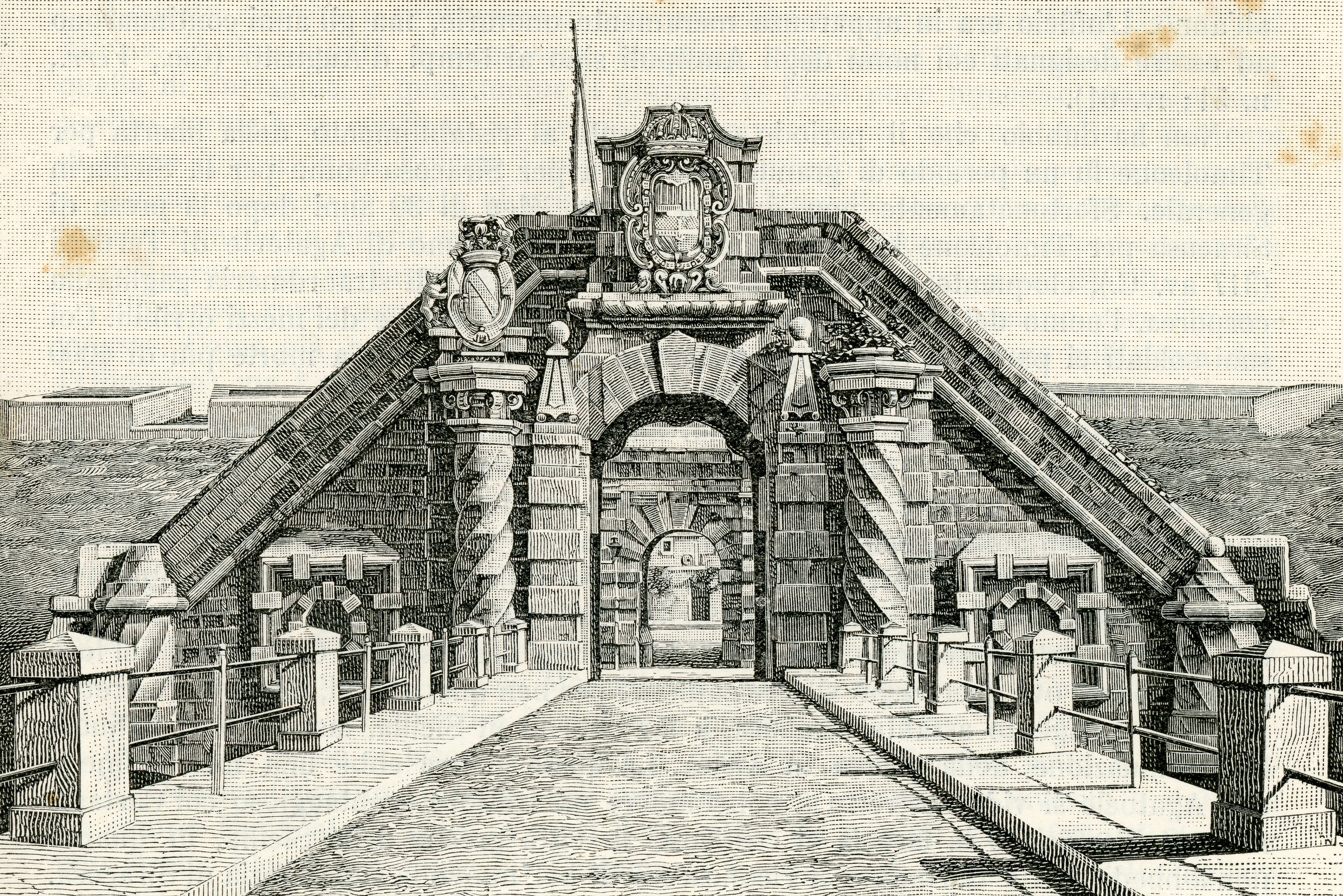
- The gate as depicted in an 1892 engraving
- Interactive map of the Porta Ligny area
- Alternative names: Porta Ligne

General information
- Status: Demolished
- Type: City gate
- Architectural style: Baroque
- Location: Ortygia, Syracuse, Sicily, Italy
- Coordinates: 37°03′52.4″N 15°17′30.0″E
- Completed: 1673
- Renovated: After 1693
- Demolished: 1893

Porta Ligny or Porta Ligne was the main city gate of the island of Ortygia in Syracuse, Sicily. It was constructed in 1673 and demolished in 1893.

== History ==
Porta Ligny was constructed in 1673 and it was named after Claude Lamoral, 3rd Prince of Ligne and Viceroy of Sicily. It formed part of the fortifications of Syracuse, which at the time were being upgraded by the Flemish military engineer Carlos de Grunenbergh, and it led towards an inner gate known as the Porta Reale or Porta Carlo V (also demolished). The fortifications were damaged during the 1693 Sicily earthquake, and some alterations were made to the gate during the subsequent repair work, which was also directed by Grunenbergh.

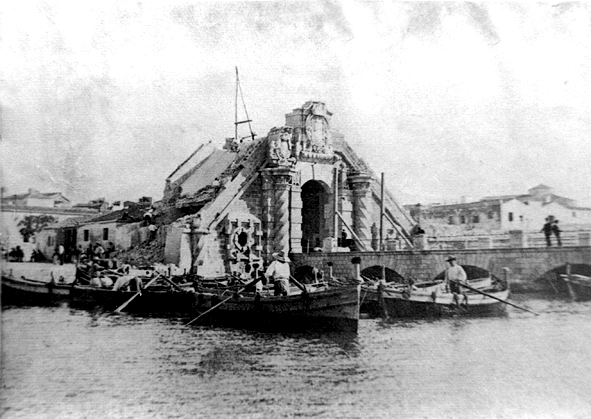
Demolition of the gate in the late 19th century

The gate and its surrounding fortifications were demolished in 1893, in accordance with an 1890 master plan drawn up by the engineer Pandolfo.

== Architecture ==
The gate consisted of a portal flanked by Solomonic columns, and it was topped by two marble coats of arms; the one of Claude Lamoral is now preserved at the Bellomo Palace Regional Gallery.

== See also ==
- Porta Spagnola, a similar gate in Augusta which still exists
