= Ricetta di Malta =

- Alternative names: Ricetta dei Cavalieri di Malta

General information
- Status: Ruins
- Type: Industrial building
- Location: Augusta, Sicily, Italy
- Coordinates: 37°13′28.4″N 15°13′21.9″E
- Completed: Late 17th century
- Closed: Early 19th century
- Client: Knights Hospitaller
- Owner: Comune of Augusta

The Ricetta di Malta, also known as the Ricetta dei Cavalieri di Malta, is a ruined historic building in Augusta, Sicily. It was built in the 17th century by the Knights Hospitaller as a supply base.

== History ==
In 1648, Viceroy of Sicily John Joseph of Austria granted permission to the Hospitaller Grand Master Giovanni Paolo Lascaris to establish a supply base in Augusta. This supplied provisions to the Hospitaller fleet and drinking water to the island of Malta, which was ruled by the Hospitallers. This supply base was initially established in rented warehouses and other buildings, but after the 1693 Sicily earthquake a permanent base was constructed over an area of approximately 5,000 m^{2} (54,000 sq ft), incorporating barracks, granaries, warehouses, stables, workshops, a windmill, a bakery and a pantry. The complex also included an oratory and a garden.

A Hospitaller knight with the title of Ricevitore Capo was in charge of the complex, which was known as a ricetta. (Note: Many such ricette were established by the Hospitallers throughout Europe, and they also acted as depositories of the Order's assets.) The base was also used to supply food and medicine to the residents of Augusta during disease epidemics, and it facilitated trade between Augusta and Malta. The complex remained in use until the end of the 18th century, when the Hospitallers were expelled from Malta by the French. In 1806, the ricetta was briefly taken over by the British (who by then had acquired Malta), but the complex closed down soon afterwards during the early 19th century.

Most of the complex no longer exists, but a small part of it still survives in Via Epicarmo and Via Cordai, although it is in a ruinous and neglected state. The site was owned by the Palumbo-Fossati family until it was donated to the Comune of Augusta in 1999. Two escutcheons depicting Hospitaller coats of arms which were originally installed on the now-demolished windmill are preserved at the Museo della Piazzaforte di Augusta.
