= Fortifications of Senglea =

- Is-Swar tal-Isla
- Senglea, Malta
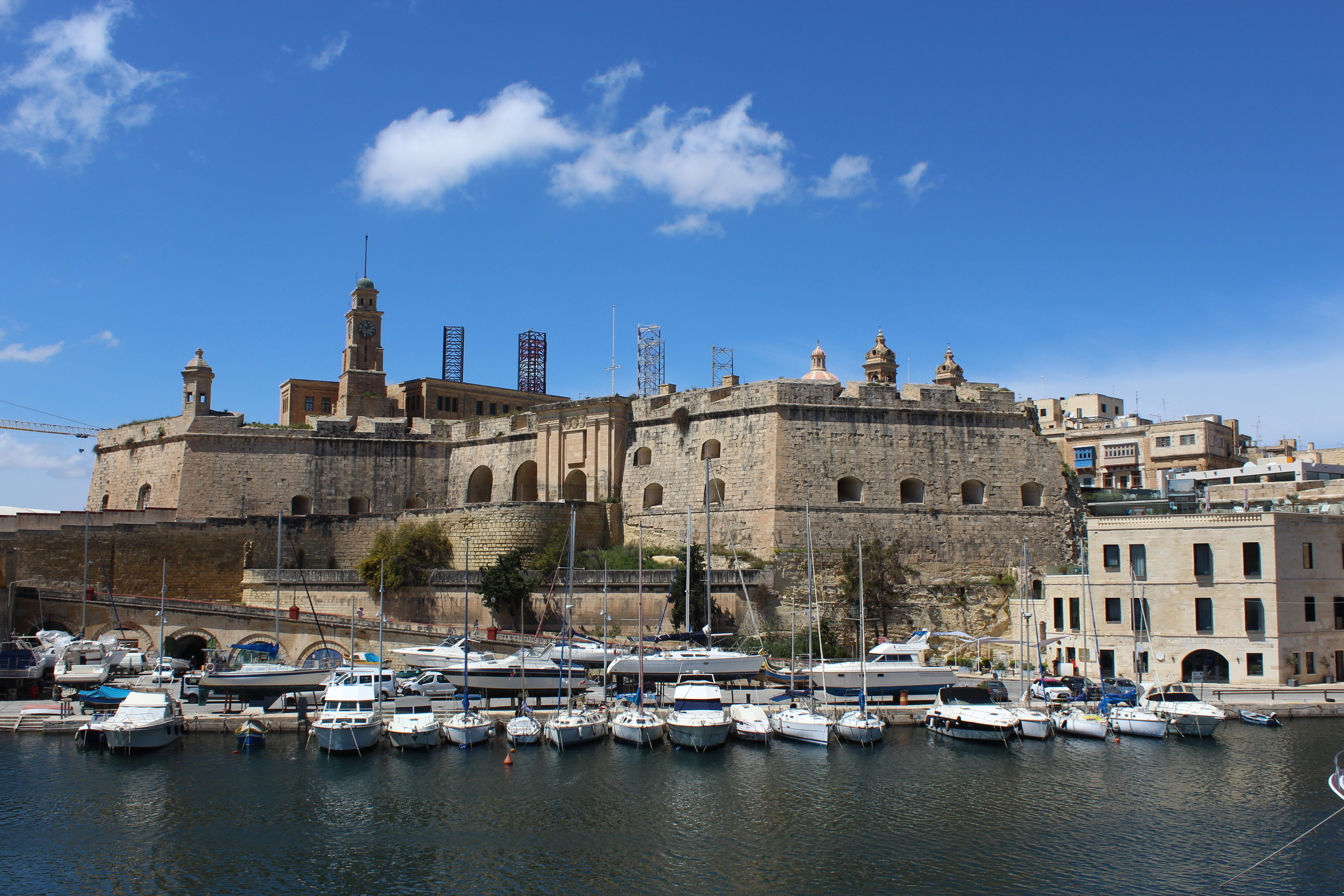
- Senglea Land Front

Site information
- Type: City wall
- Owner: Government of Malta
- Condition: Partially intact

Location
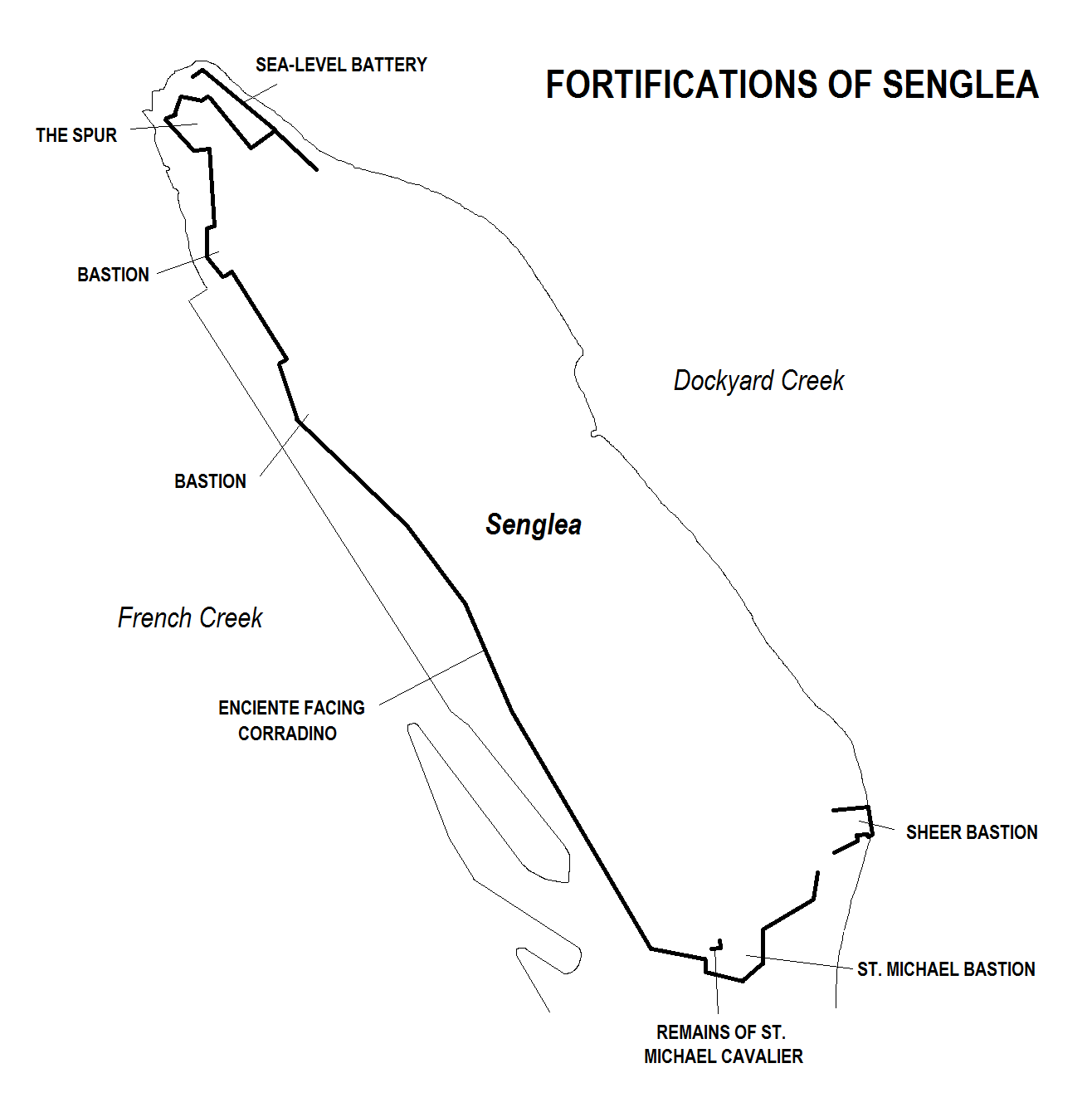
- Map of Senglea's fortifications as they are today
- Location within Malta
- Coordinates: 35°53′4.4″N 14°31′8.1″E

Site history
- Built: 1552–18th century
- Built by: Order of Saint John
- Materials: Limestone
- Battles/wars: Great Siege of Malta (1565); Siege of Malta (1798–1800)

The fortifications of Senglea (Maltese: Is-Swar tal-Isla) are a series of defensive walls and other fortifications which surround the city of Senglea, Malta. The first fortification to be built was Fort Saint Michael in 1552, and the majority of the fortifications were built over the next decade when it was founded by Grand Master Claude de la Sengle. Modifications continued until the 18th century, but large parts of the fortifications were demolished between the 19th and 20th centuries. Today, all that remain of Senglea's fortifications are the seaward bastions and part of the land front.

Senglea's fortifications have been on Malta's tentative list of UNESCO World Heritage Sites since 1998, as part of the Knights' Fortifications around the Harbours of Malta.

== History ==
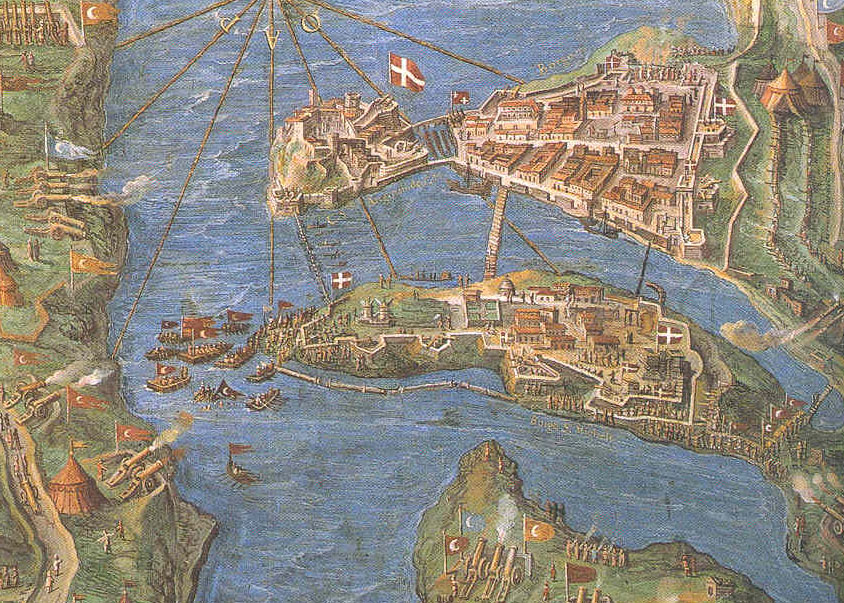
Map of Senglea (bottom) and Birgu (top) during the Great Siege of Malta

The city of Senglea and its fortifications were built as a result of the attack of 1551. After the attack, the Order of Saint John realized the need to build more defences, and a year later, two forts began to be built. The first of these was Fort Saint Elmo at the tip of the Sciberras Peninsula (now Valletta), while the second was Fort Saint Michael, which was built on a peninsula known as l'Isola. In 1553, the entire peninsula began to be surrounded by fortifications, and was later developed into a city. It was named Senglea after the ruling Grand Master, Claude de la Sengle.

The city played an important role in the Great Siege of Malta of 1565, when it was repeatedly attacked by the invading Ottoman forces. It did not fall, and was given the title of Città Invicta (unconquered city). After the siege, the Order began to build its new capital of Valletta, and in the meantime Senglea was neglected. The architect Francesco Laparelli even proposed that the city should be razed. Eventually, this proposal was ignored and the city's defences were repaired, being completed by 1581.

In the 17th and 18th centuries, various outworks were added. In addition, the Santa Margherita Lines and the Cottonera Lines were built around Bormla, which helped increase the strength of the defensive position, but also reduced the importance of Senglea's and Birgu's land fronts.

Large parts of Senglea and Bormla fortifications in French creek were demolished and rebuilt to make way for part of the Malta Dockyard in Bormla during the 19th century. The land front was also heavily altered in the early 20th century, but the remaining fortifications were included on the Antiquities List of 1925. The entire city, including parts of its fortifications, was severely damaged by aerial bombardment in World War II.

Parts of the land front and the seaward bastions have been restored in recent years.

== Layout ==
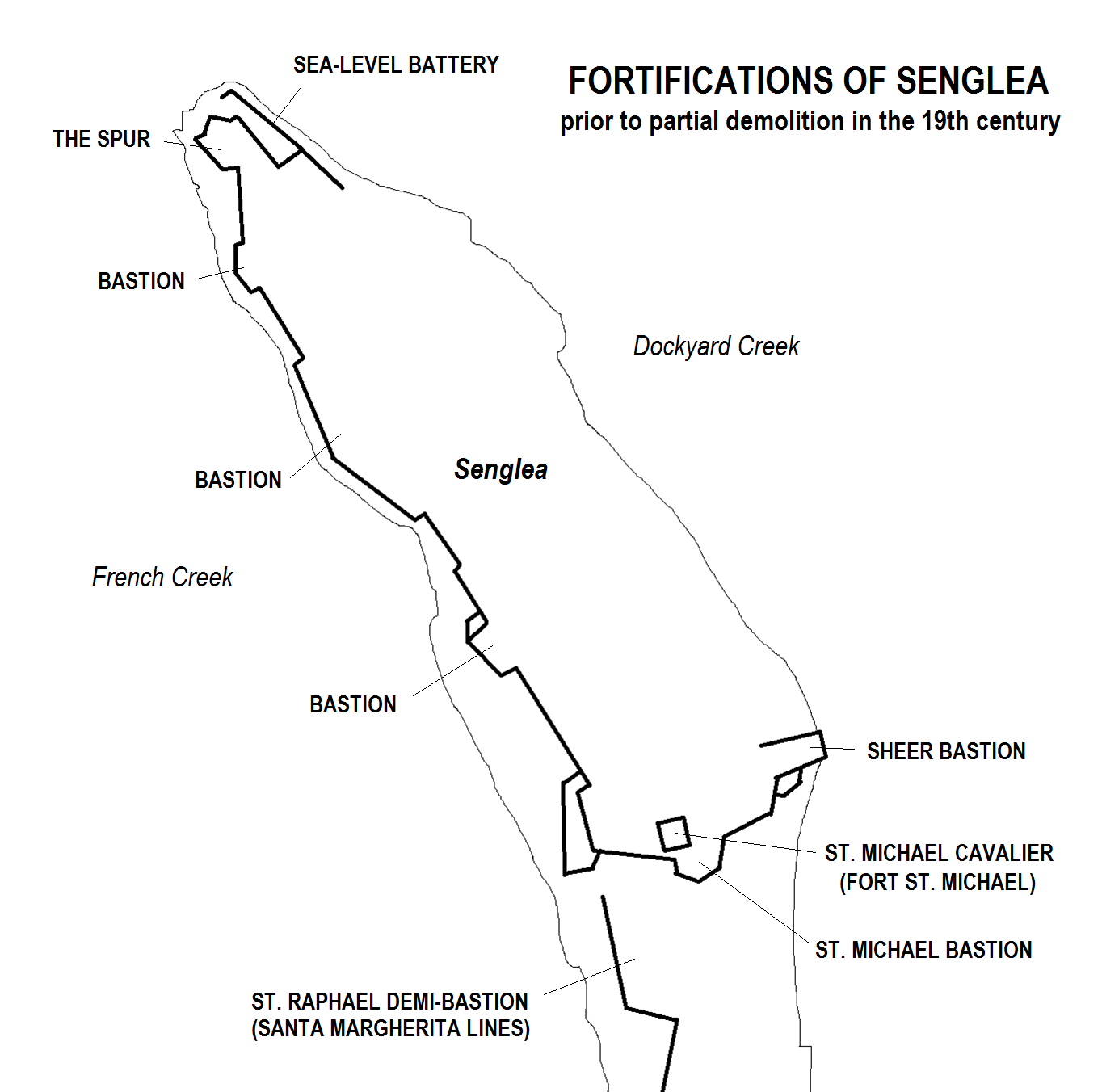
Map of Senglea's fortifications prior to partial demolition in the 19th century

Senglea's fortifications as they are today consist of (listed going clockwise from the land front to the Spur):

- Sheer Bastion, also known as il-Maċina – a wedge-shaped bastion in Dockyard Creek. A device to mount masts on galleys was originally mounted on top of the rampart.
- A casemated curtain wall linking Sheer Bastion to St. Michael Bastion. The curtain wall contains St. Anne Gate, the main gate of Senglea. Some damage sustained form aerial bombardment in World War II can still be seen on the curtain wall.
- St. Michael Bastion – the main bastion of Senglea's land front, containing a large echaugette.
  - St. Michael Cavalier – a cavalier that was originally Fort Saint Michael. It was demolished in 1921, but a small part of its base has survived.
- A curtain wall that originally linked St. Michael Bastion to a demi-bastion along the Corradino side. The demi-bastion was demolished in the 19th century.
- A long stretch of curtain wall along the Corradino side. The present structure was built in the 19th century, replacing the original fortifications which had to be demolished to make way for the dockyard.
- The Spur – the seaward bastion of Senglea, facing Valletta. It contains a reconstructed echaugette (the original had been dismantled in World War II), and its top part is now a public garden.
- A sea-level battery (sometimes referred to as Lower Spur Battery) at the base of the Spur. It was designed by Carlos de Grunenbergh in the 1680s, and it has ten embrasures.

== Gallery ==
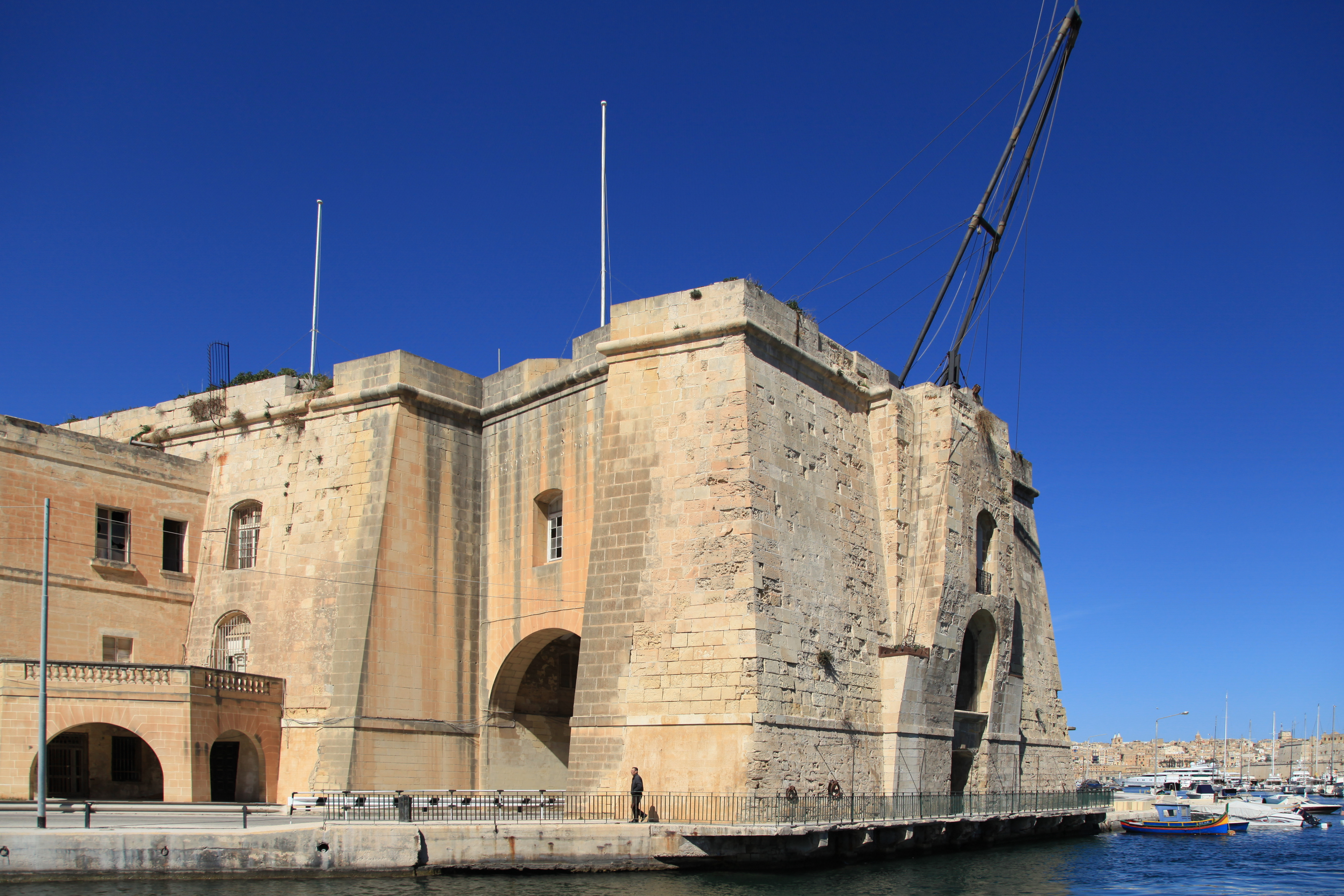
Sheer Bastion (il-Maċina)

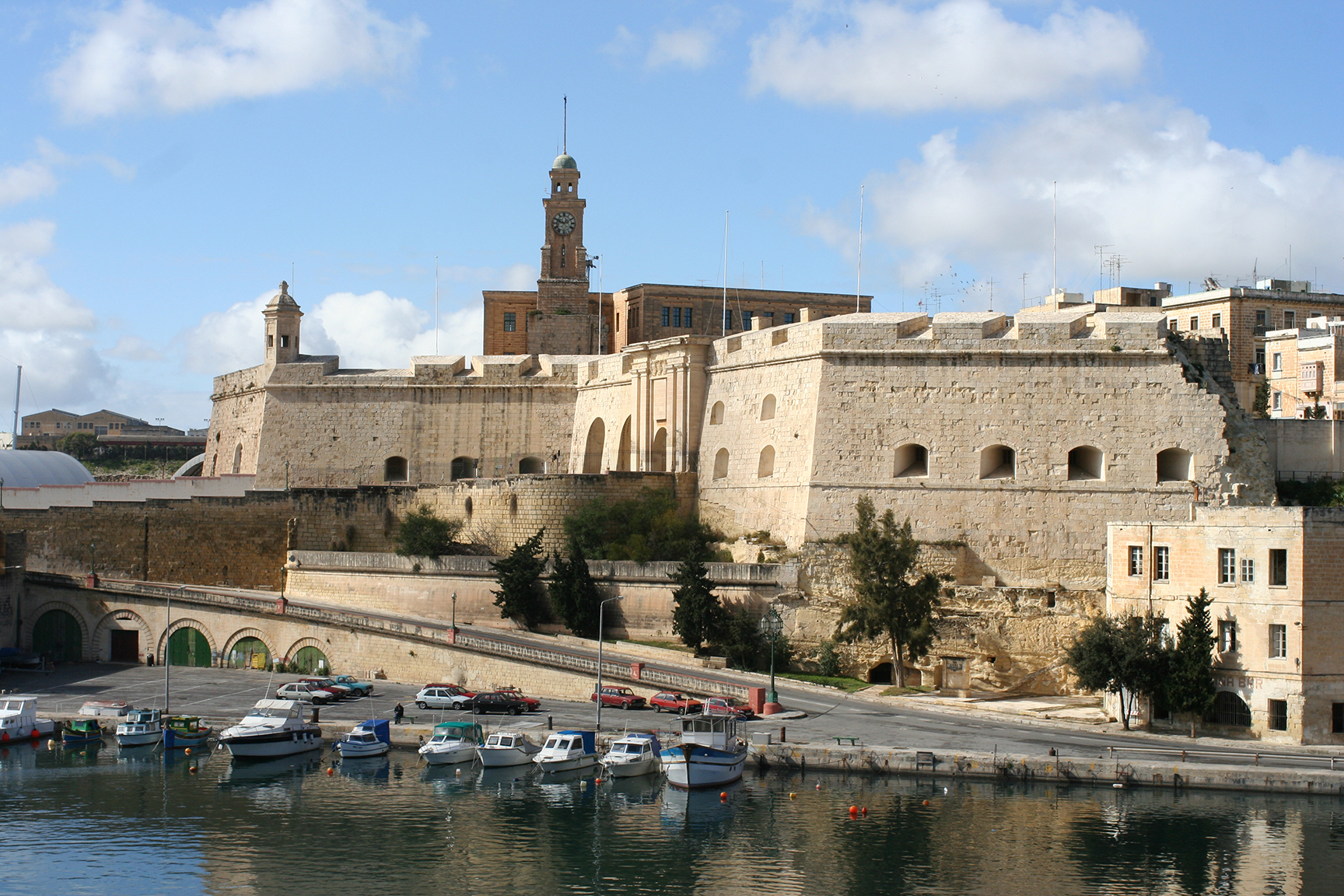
St. Michael Bastion and the damaged curtain wall which originally linked it to Sheer Bastion

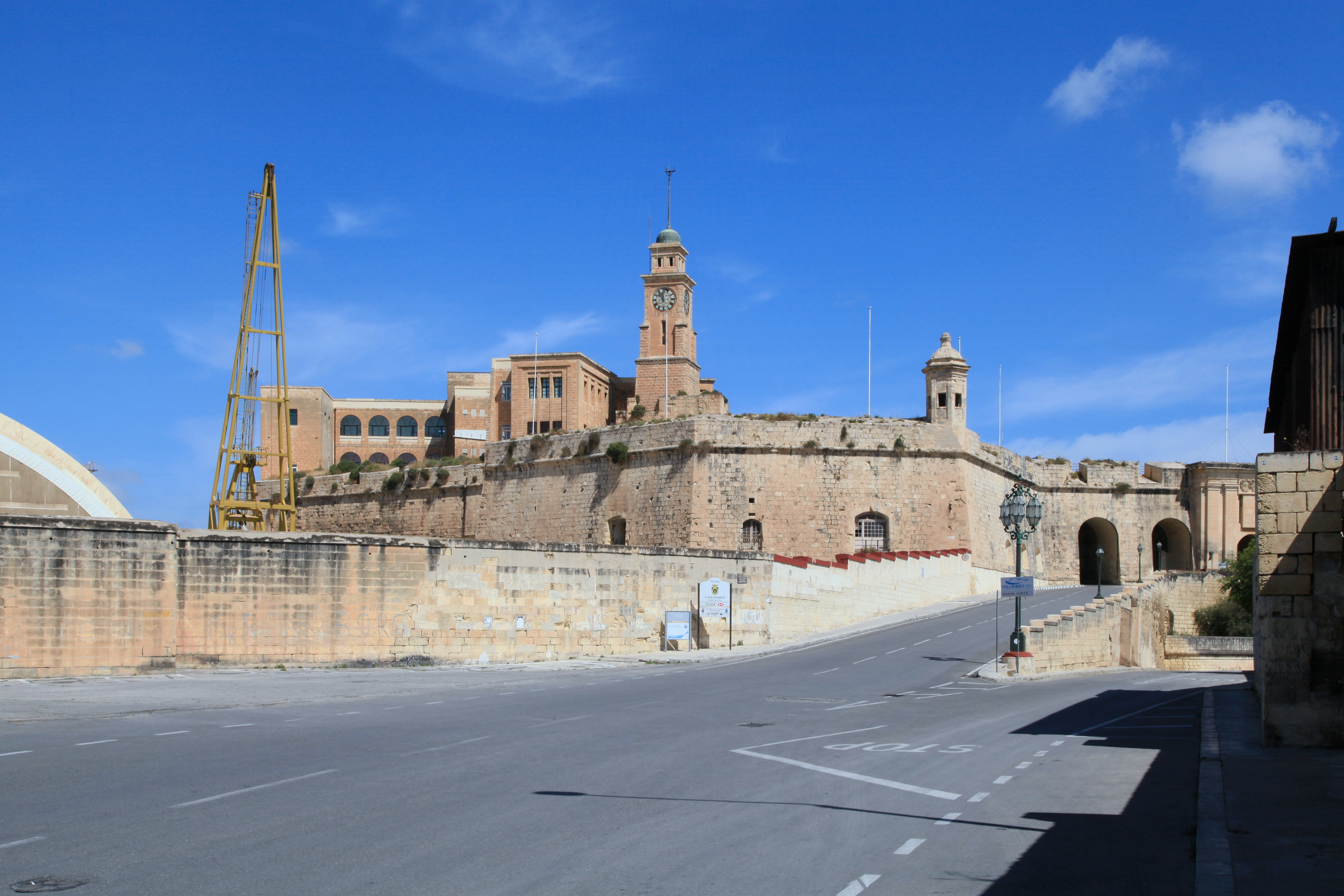
St. Michael Bastion (the site of the clock tower was originally Fort Saint Michael)

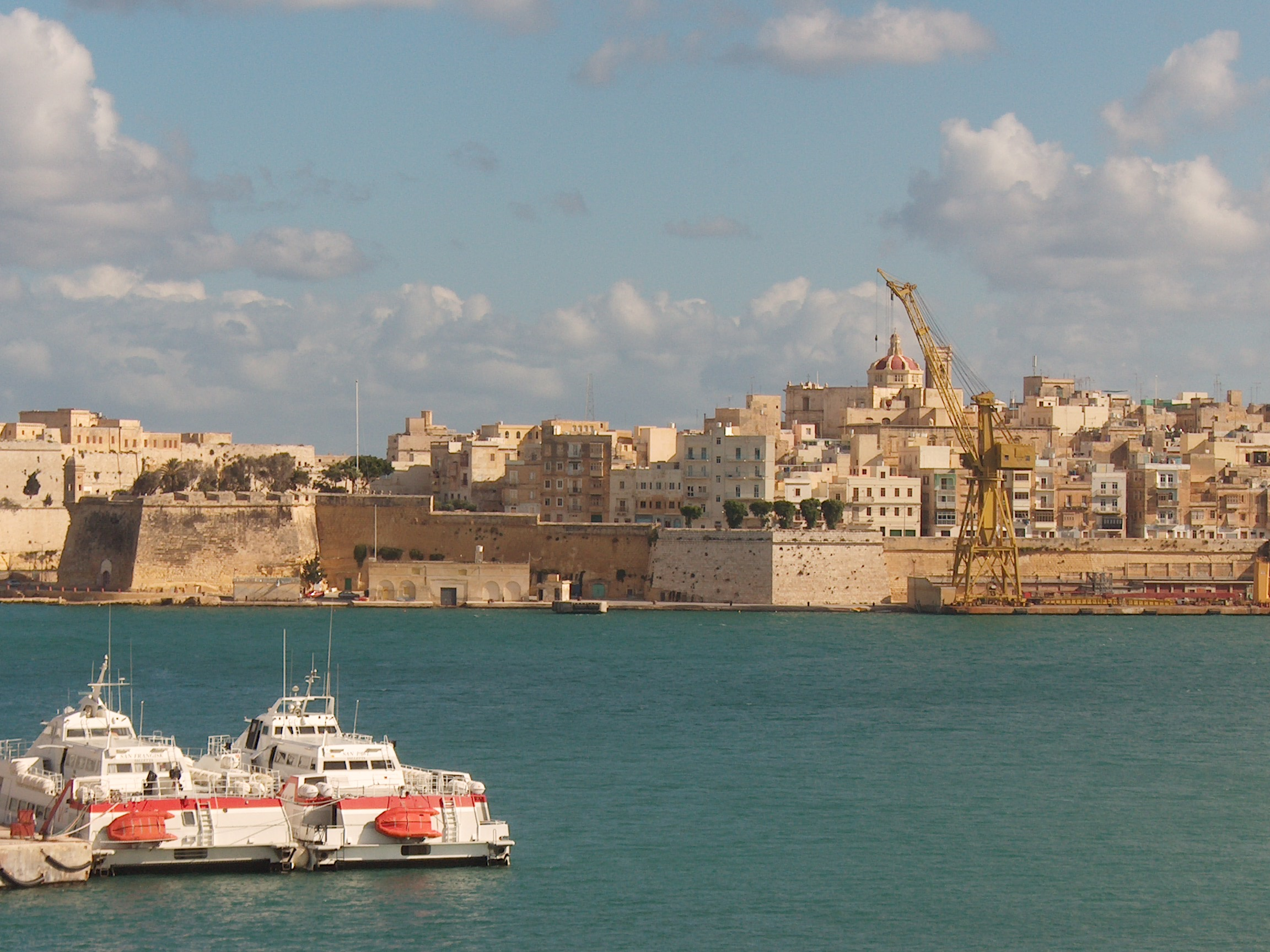
The enceinte facing Corradino

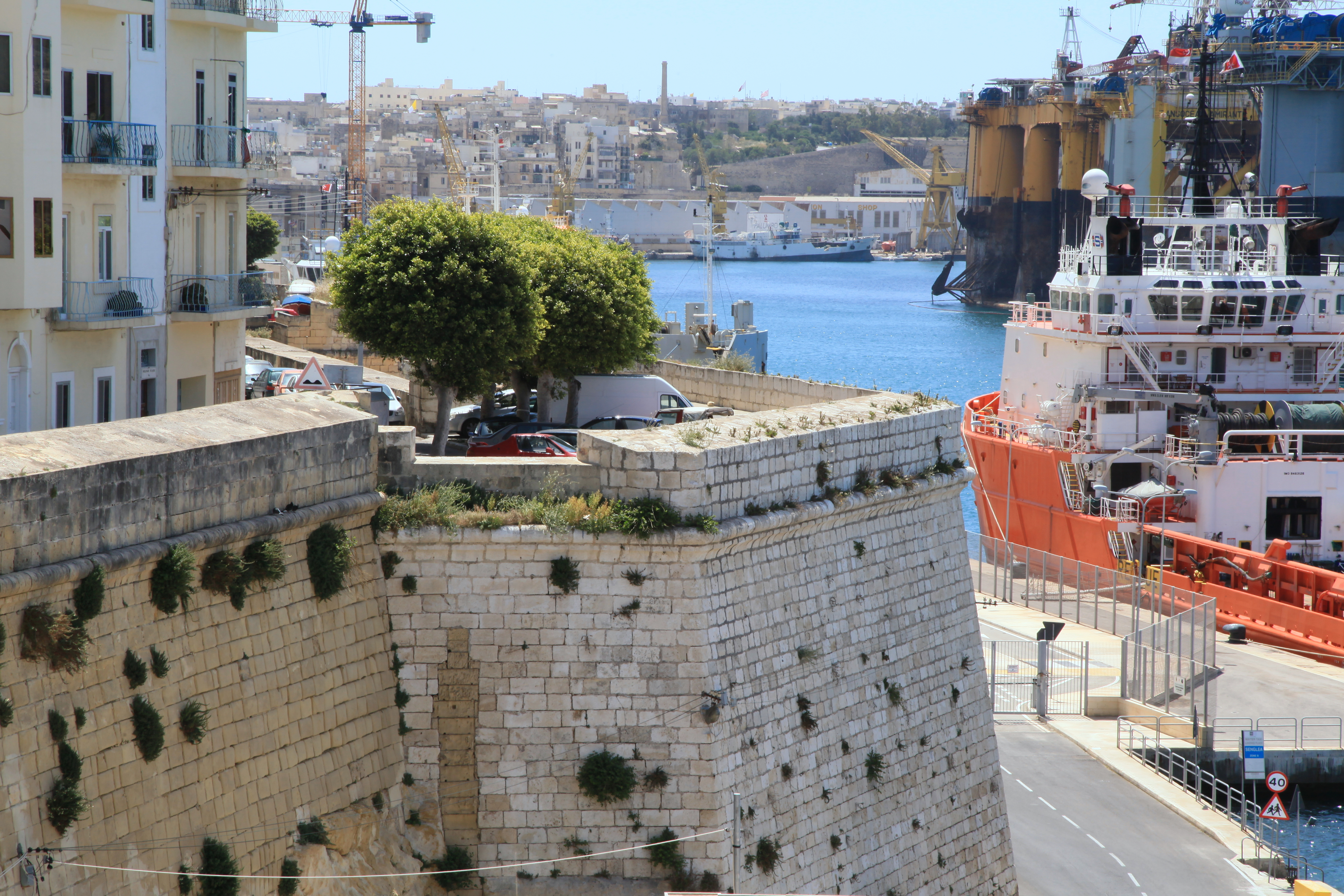
Small bastion within the enceinte facing Corradino

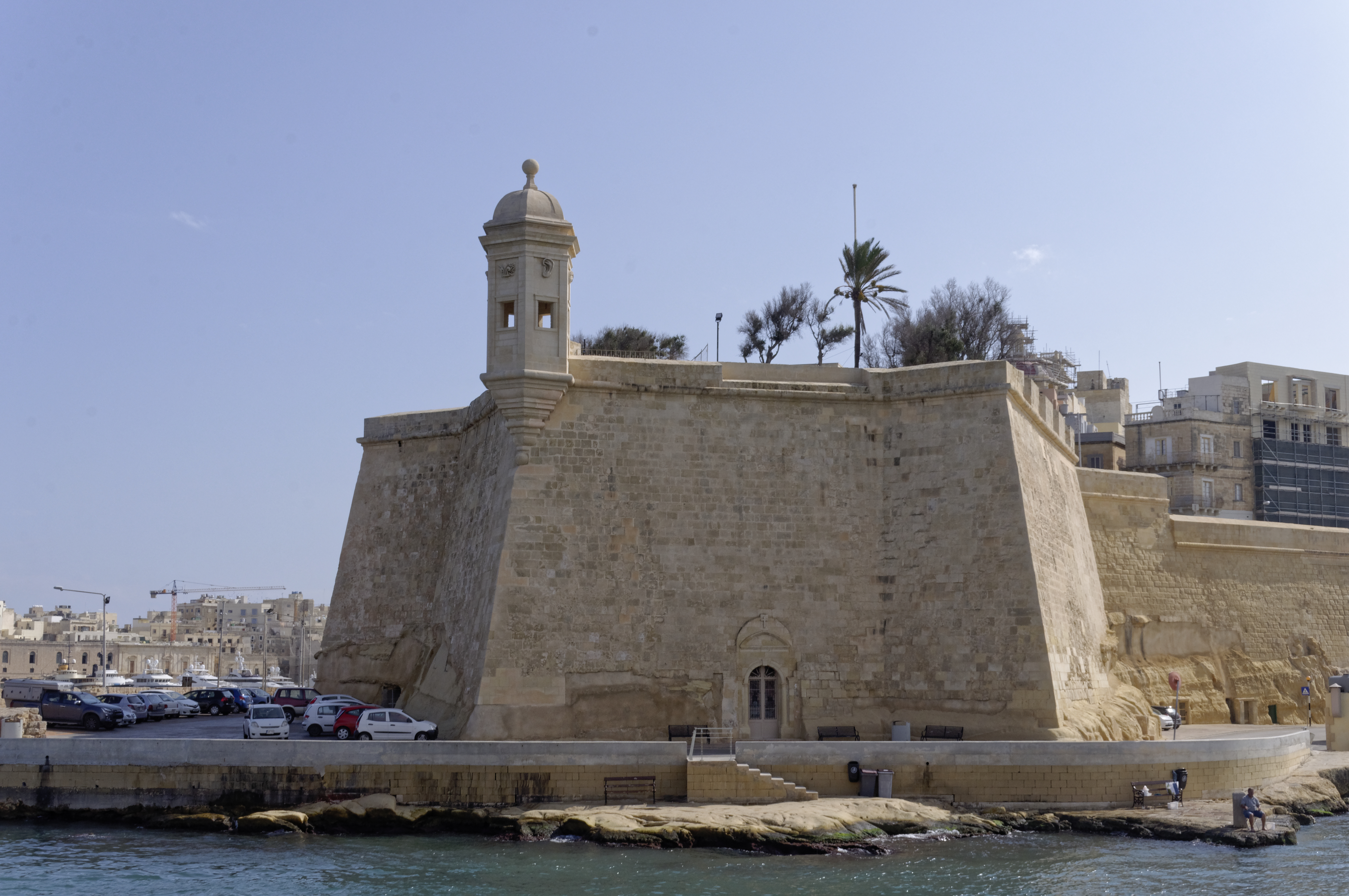
The Spur

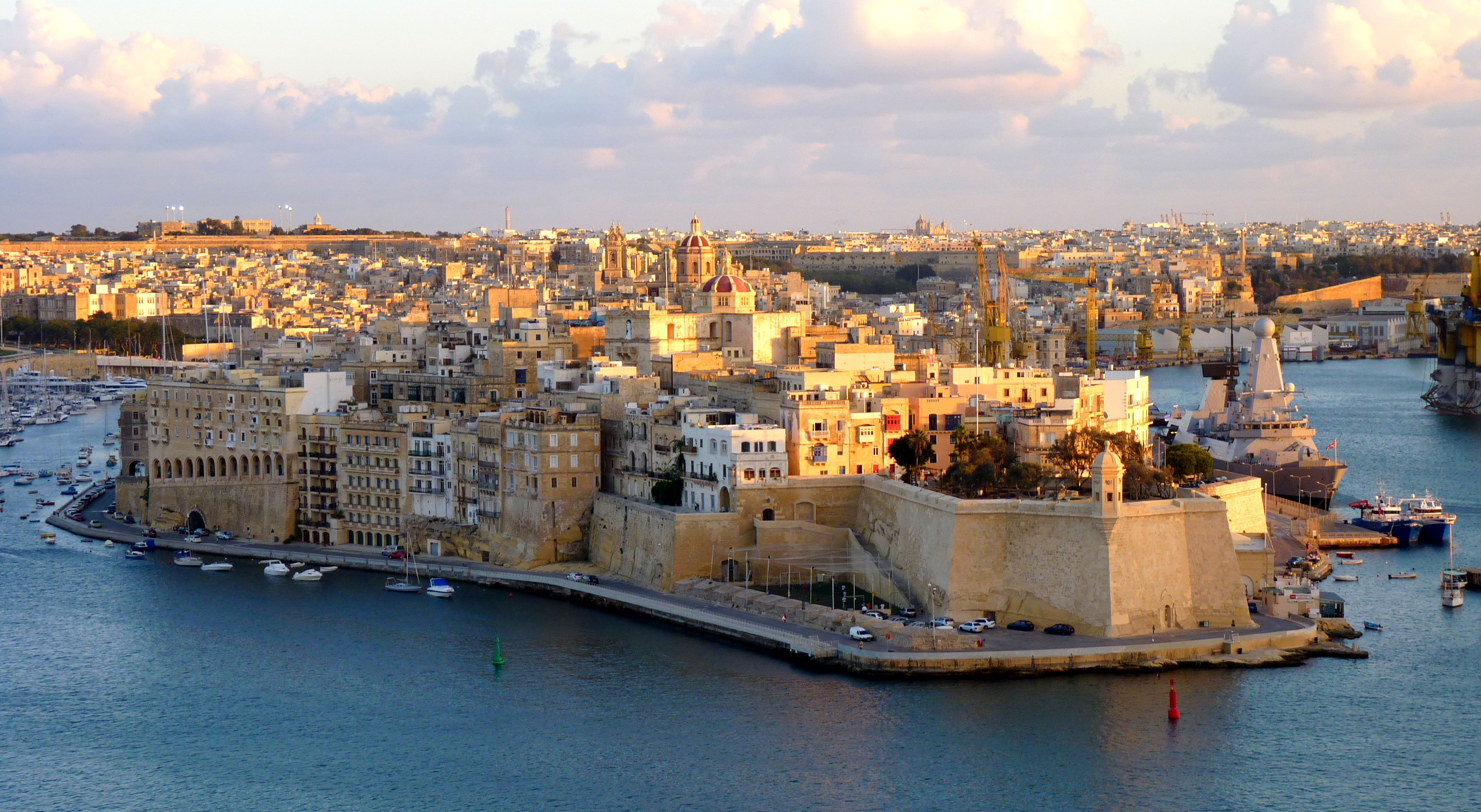
The Spur as seen from the Upper Barrakka Gardens

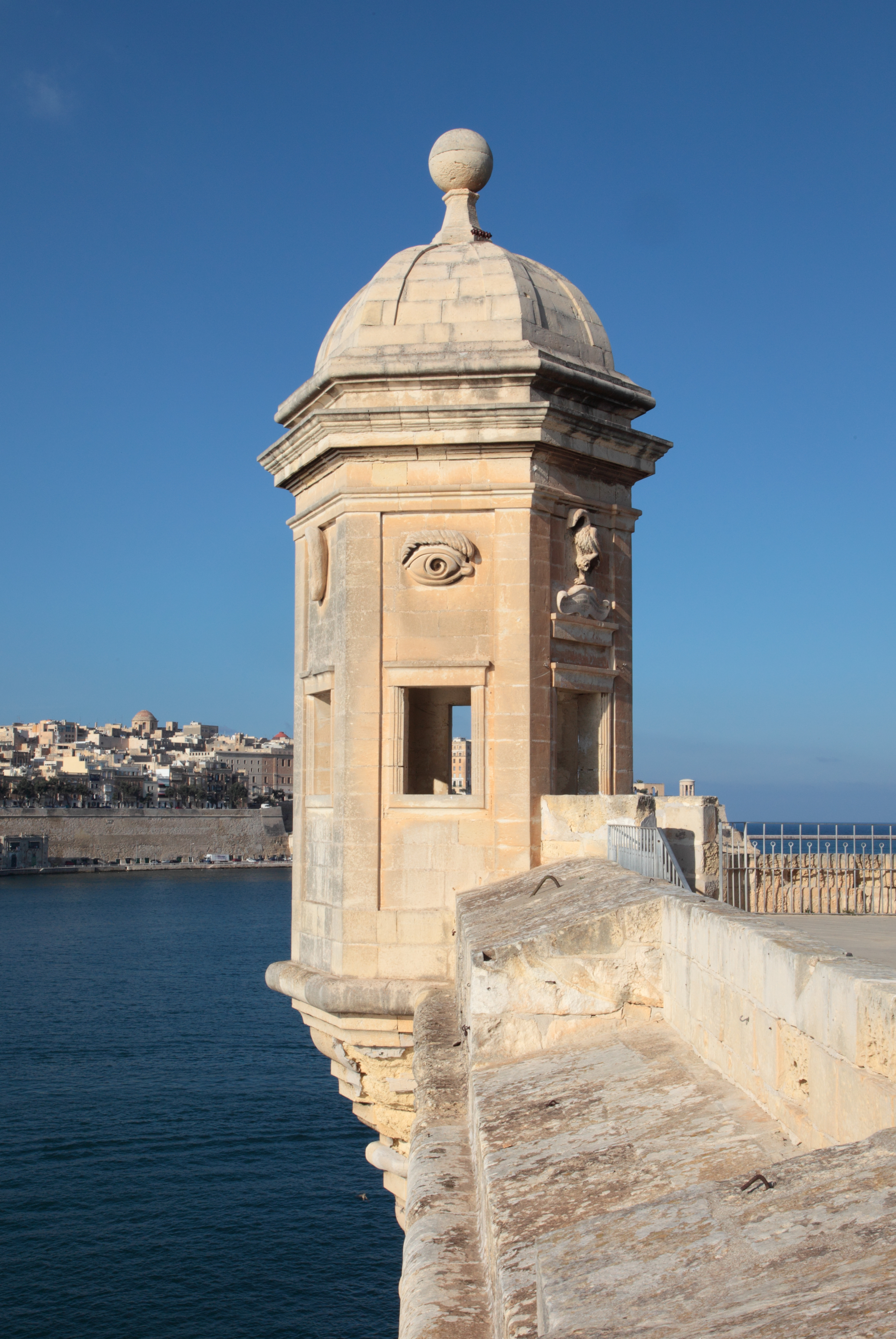
Reconstructed echaugette (Gardjola) on the Spur

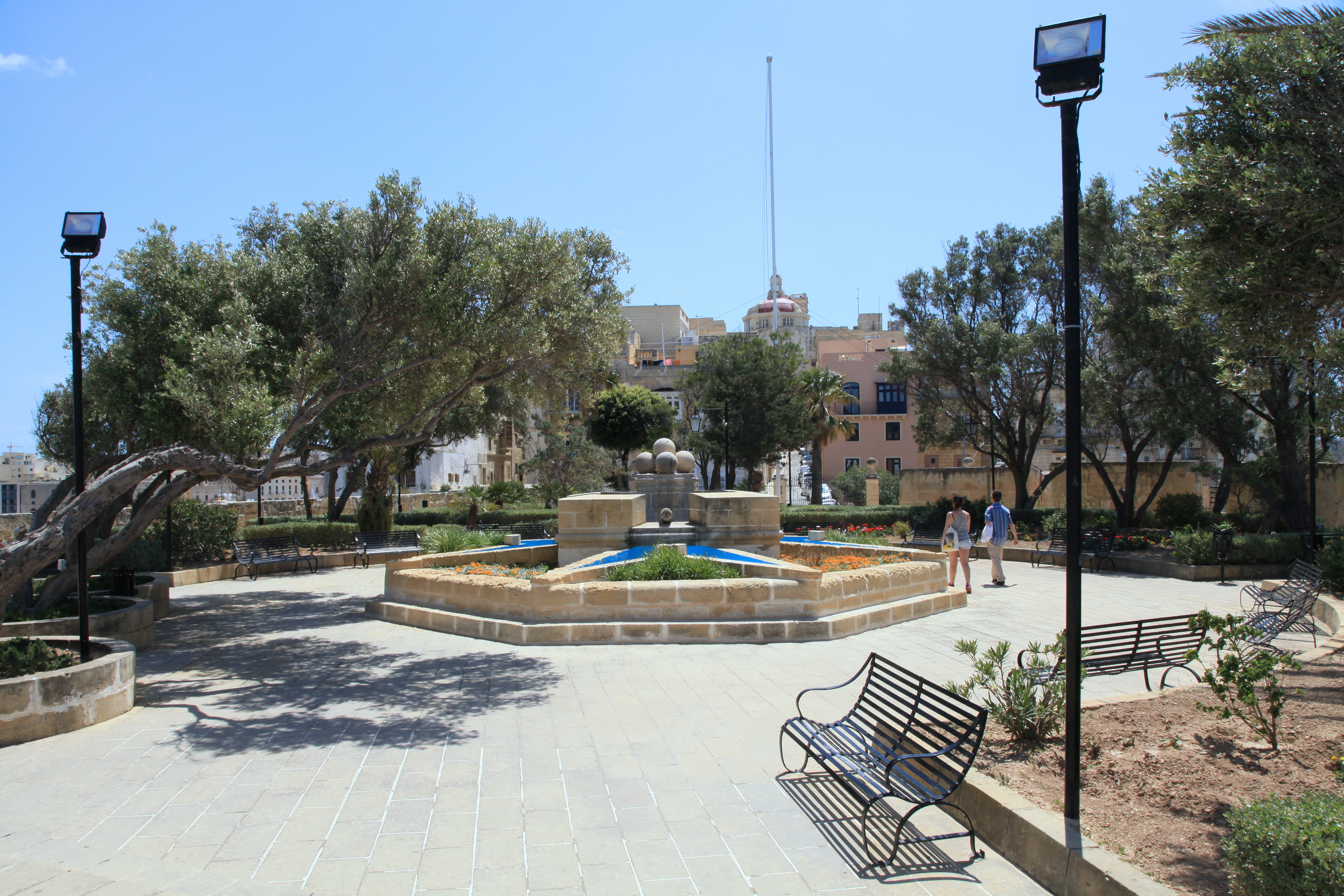
Gardjola Garden, located on the Spur

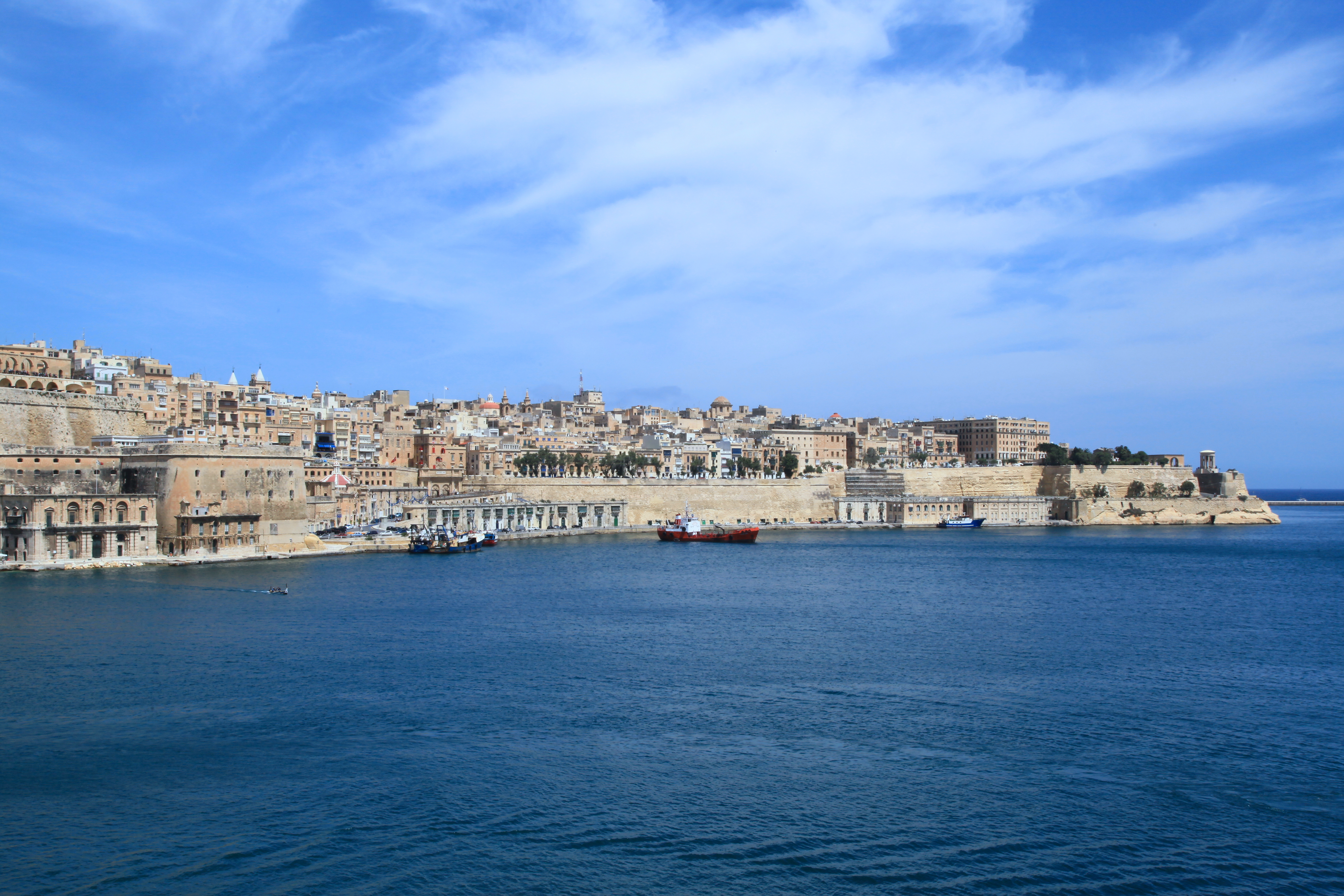
Valletta as seen from the Spur
