= Carlos de Grunenbergh =

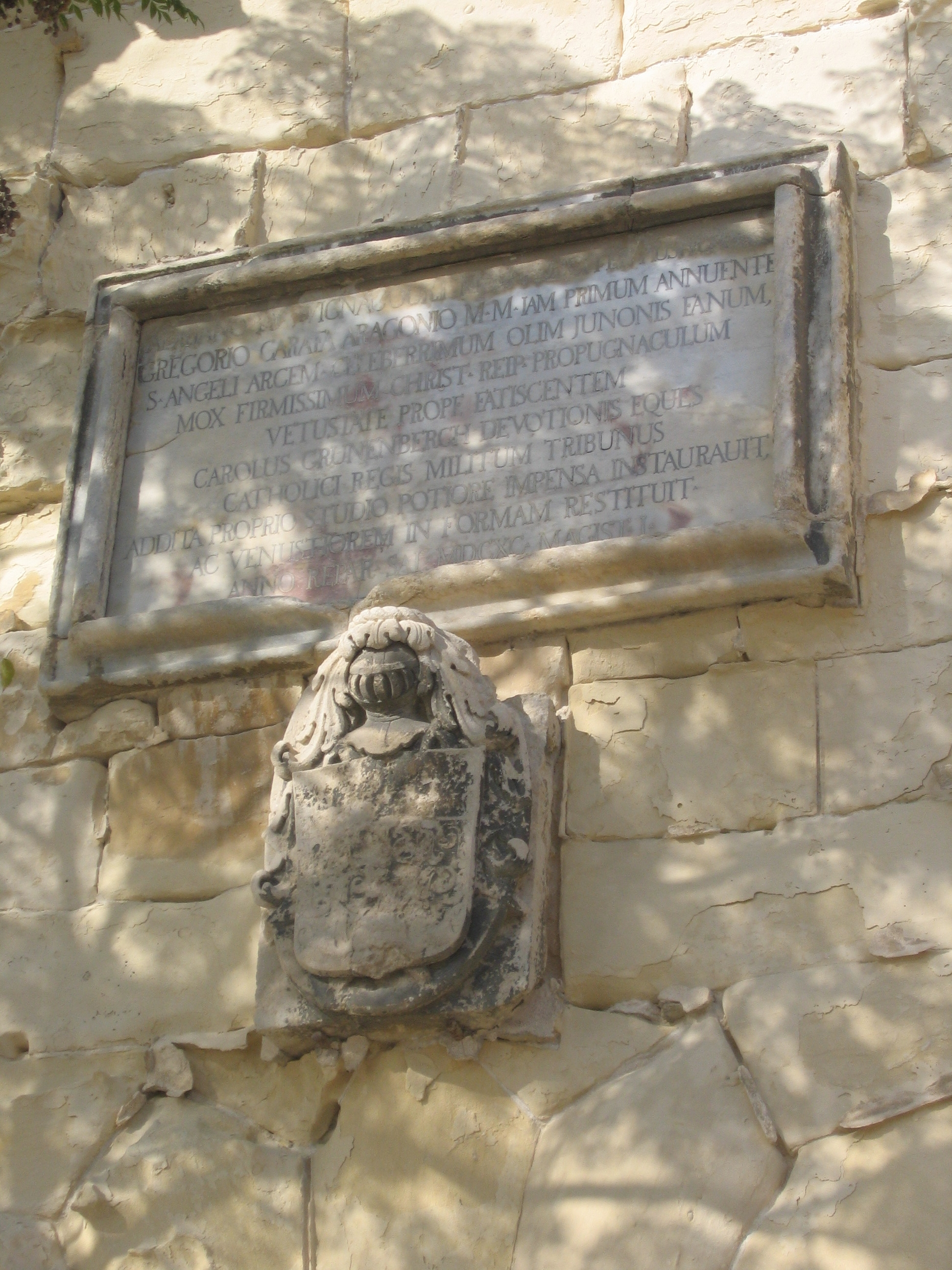
Grunenbergh's coat of arms and a commemorative inscription at Fort St Angelo

Carlos de Grunenbergh, also known as Carlo Grunenberg (died 1696), was a Flemish architect and military engineer active in the late 17th century. He mainly designed fortifications in Sicily and Malta. He was also a member of the Order of Saint John.

== Career ==
In the mid-17th century, Grunenbergh worked in Spain with his brother Ferdinand. He was eventually appointed as the military engineer of the Viceroy of Sicily, and he designed or modified various fortifications in the last few decades of the century, including the walls of Augusta, Messina and Catania.

In 1681, Grunenbergh was invited to Malta by Gregorio Carafa, the Grand Master of the Order of Saint John. He made a number of improvements and modifications to the islands' fortifications. The improvements included the addition of batteries to the fortifications of Valletta and Senglea, and the construction of the Carafa Enceinte around Fort Saint Elmo.

Grunenbergh came to Malta again in 1687, and designed and paid for the construction of batteries and other major alterations to Fort St Angelo. To honour his contribution, he was made a Knight of Devotion of the Order of St. John. His coat of arms and a commemorative inscription are also located at the fort's main gate.

Grunenbergh directed the reconstruction of various fortifications in Sicily following the devastating earthquake of 1693, including the walls of Augusta and Syracuse. He also dealt with the urban reconstruction of the city of Catania. Grunenbergh died in 1696.

Only one portrait of Grunenbergh is known. It is sometimes attributed to Mattia Preti, and it is now in a private collection.

== Works ==
- Fortifications of Augusta (including Porta Spagnola), Sicily (1671-1690s)
- Ligny Tower, Trapani, Sicily (1671)
- Fortifications of Siracusa, Sicily (1673 onwards)
- Real Cittadella, Messina, Sicily (1680-1686)
- Carafa Enceinte in Fort Saint Elmo, Valletta, Malta (1687 onwards)
- Batteries within the fortifications of Valletta and Senglea, Malta (1680s)
- Batteries and other major alterations to Fort St Angelo, Birgu, Malta (1689-1691)
