= Porta Spagnola =

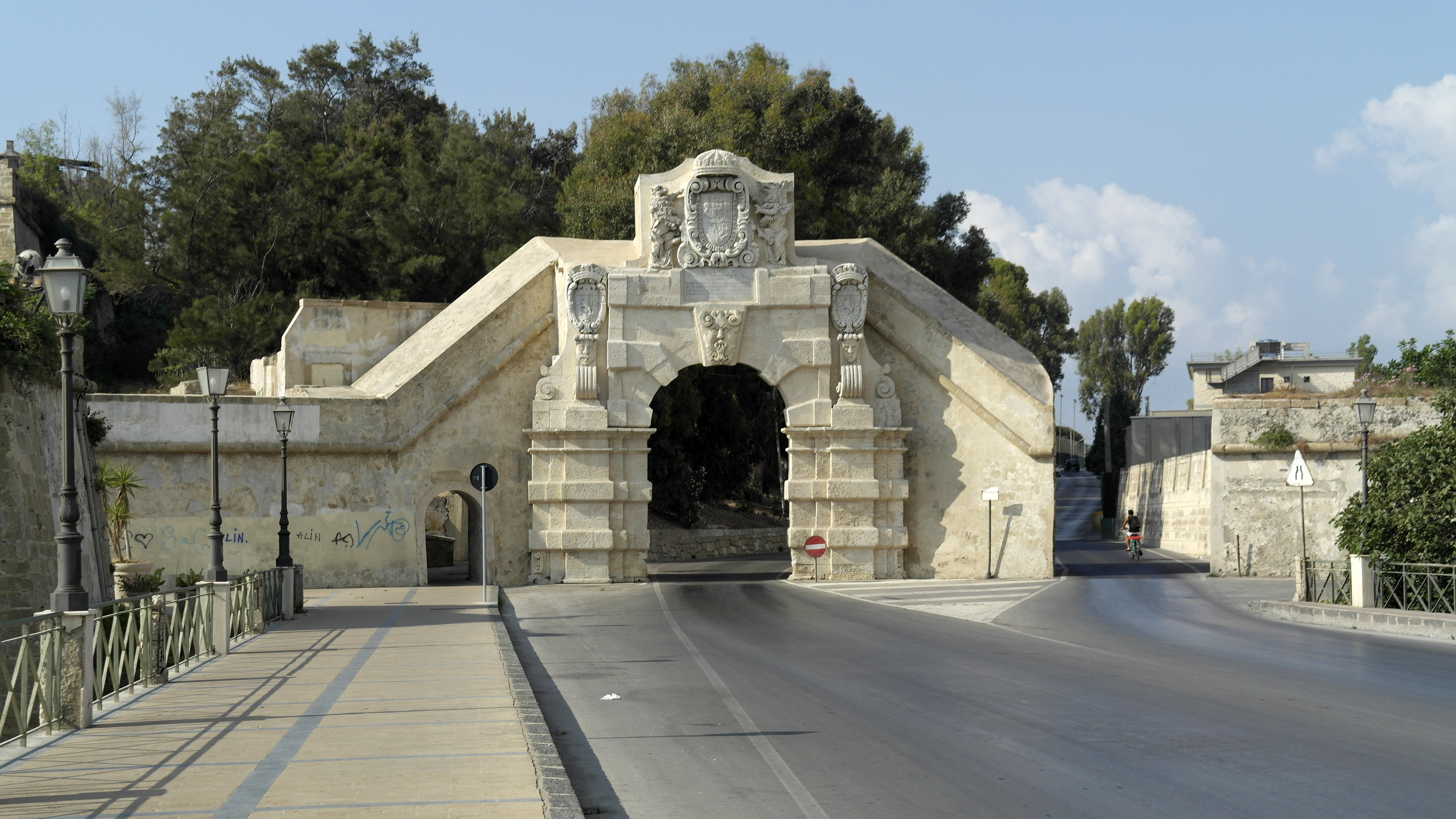
- The gate in 2013
- Interactive map of the Porta Spagnola area
- Alternative names: Porta di Terra

General information
- Status: Intact
- Type: City gate
- Architectural style: Baroque
- Location: Augusta, Sicily, Italy
- Coordinates: 37°14′08.7″N 15°13′12.3″E
- Construction started: 1681
- Completed: 1682
- Cost: 30,000 scudi

Design and construction
- Architect: Carlos de Grunenbergh

Porta Spagnola (Italian for Spanish Gate), also known as the Porta di Terra (Land Gate) is a city gate in Augusta, Sicily. It was built between 1681 and 1682 as part of the city's fortifications.

== History ==
The fortifications of Augusta were constructed in the 1670s and 1680s to designs of the Flemish military engineer Carlos de Grunenbergh. On 13 May 1680, the city council granted a loan of 30,000 scudi for the construction of the Porta Spagnola, which was built between 1681 and 1682. The gate is the only entrance into the historic centre of Augusta, and it was built across an isthmus which was subsequently excavated, turning the city into an island. The design of the gate is attributed to Grunenbergh himself.

The gate was located a few hundred metres away from another gate known as the Porta Madre di Dio, which no longer exists. Porta Spagnola was damaged in an earthquake on 13 December 1990, and it was restored in 2005.

== Architecture ==
The gate is topped by a marble coat of arms topped by a crown and supported by a lion and a griffin. Below the escutcheon there is a Latin inscription which reads:

D O M

CAROLO II HISPANIARVM AC SICILIÆ
REGE IMPERANTE,
DON FRANCISCVS BENAVIDES COMES SANT STEVAN
SICILIÆ PROREX IN TANTI PORTV. LITORE MVNIENDO
NON SOLVM SICILIÆ SED TOTIVS ITALIÆ ET CHRISTIANI
NOMINIS INCOLVMITATI CONSVLERE EXISTIMAVIT
ANNO M DC XXCI

(meaning To God, most good, most great. Under the reign of Charles II, King of Spain and Sicily, Don Francisco de Benavides, Count of Santisteban and Viceroy of Sicily, in fortifying the coast of such a large port, thought to provide for the safety not only of Sicily, but of all Italy and Christendom, in the year 1681.)

== See also ==
- Porta Ligny, a similar gate in Syracuse which was demolished
