= Brucoli =

- Frazione
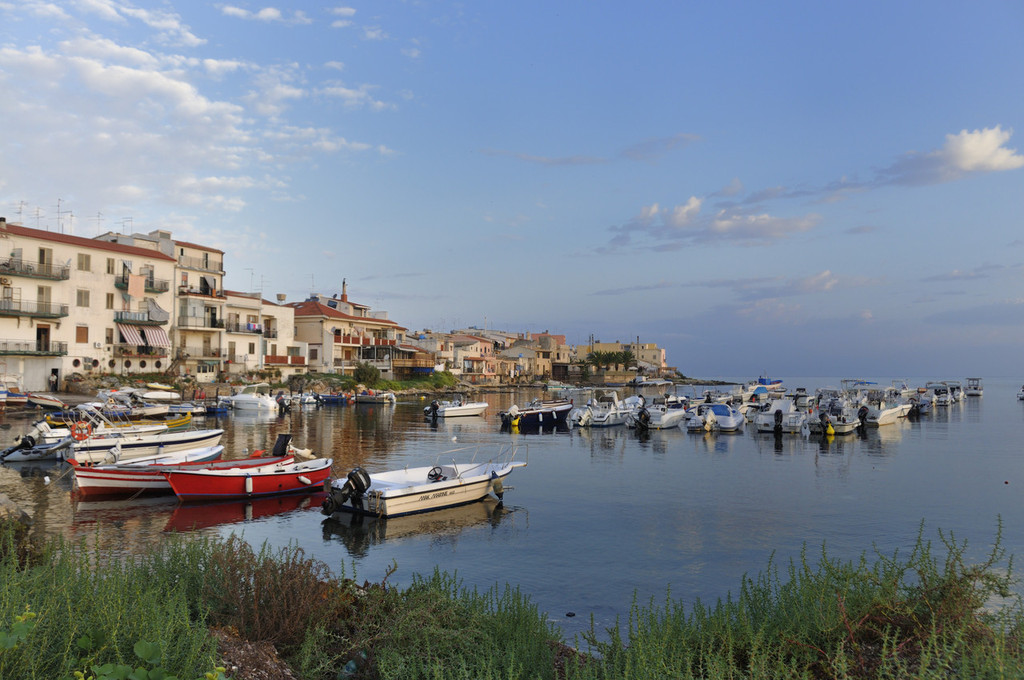
- Brucoli

- Location of Brucoli in Italy
- Coordinates: 37°17′3″N 15°11′16″E
- Country: Italy
- Region: Sicily
- Province: Syracuse (SR)
- Comune: Augusta
- Elevation: 4 m (13 ft)

Population (2011)
  - Total: 1,098
- Time zone: UTC+1 (CET)
  - Summer (DST): UTC+2 (CEST)
- Postal code: 96011
- Dialing code: (+39) 0931

Brucoli (Sicilian: Brùculi) is a southern Italian hamlet (frazione) of Augusta, a municipality part of the Province of Syracuse, Sicily.

Brucoli is located by the Ionian Sea coast of the island of Sicily and is 6.25 kilometres (3.88 mi) from Augusta. It has a population of 1,098.

At the ancient time, it was a colony of Megara founded by the Megarian Lamis (Ancient Greek: Λάμις) in Magna Graecia and called Trotilon (Ancient Greek: Τρώτιλον).

== Gallery ==
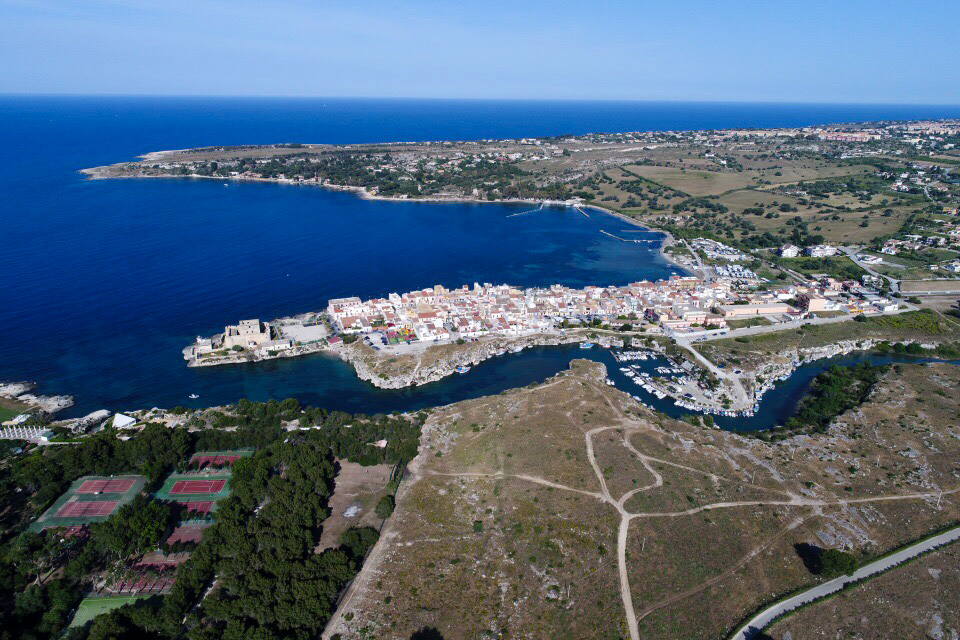
Panorama

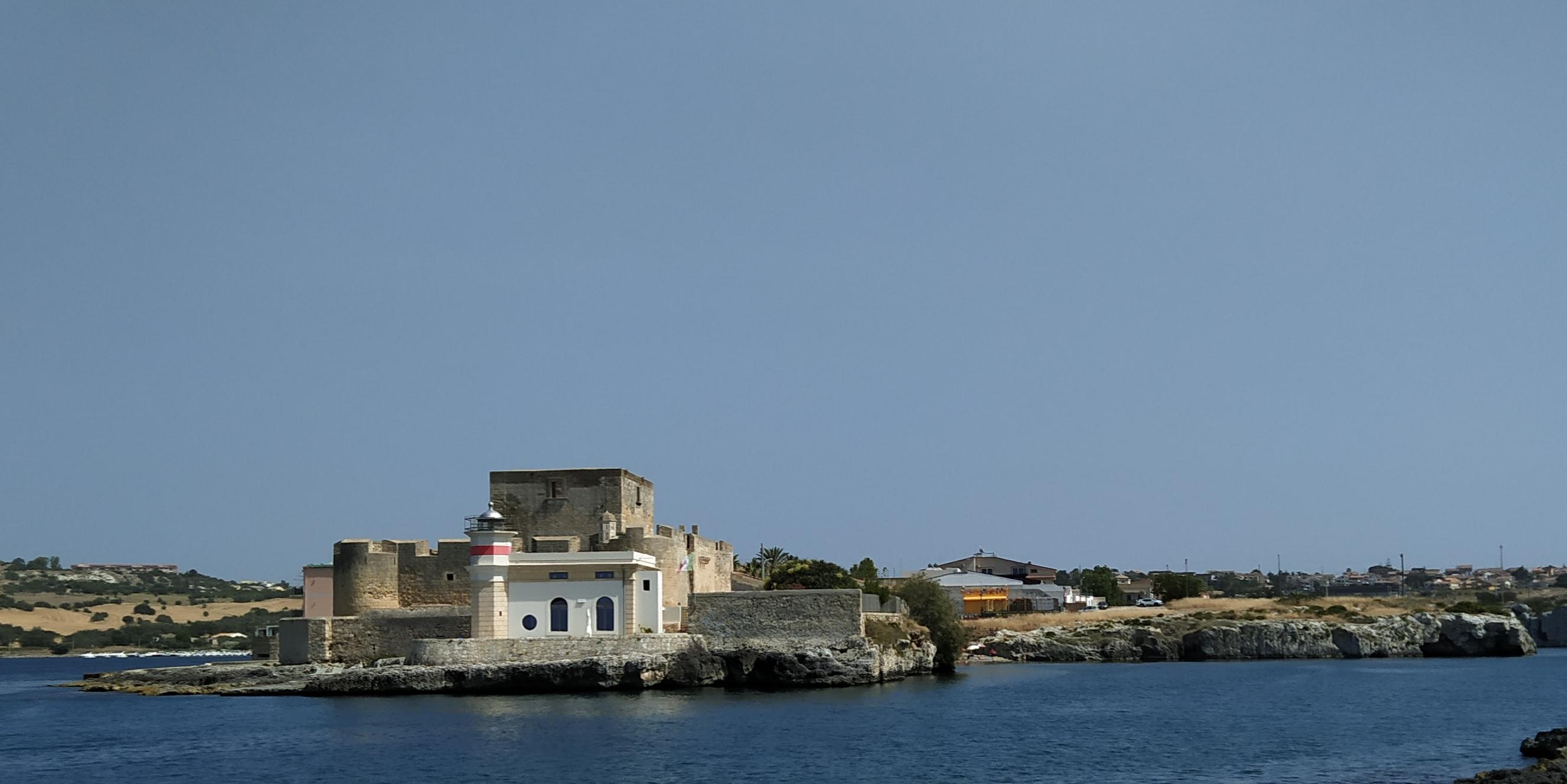
Lighthouse and castle

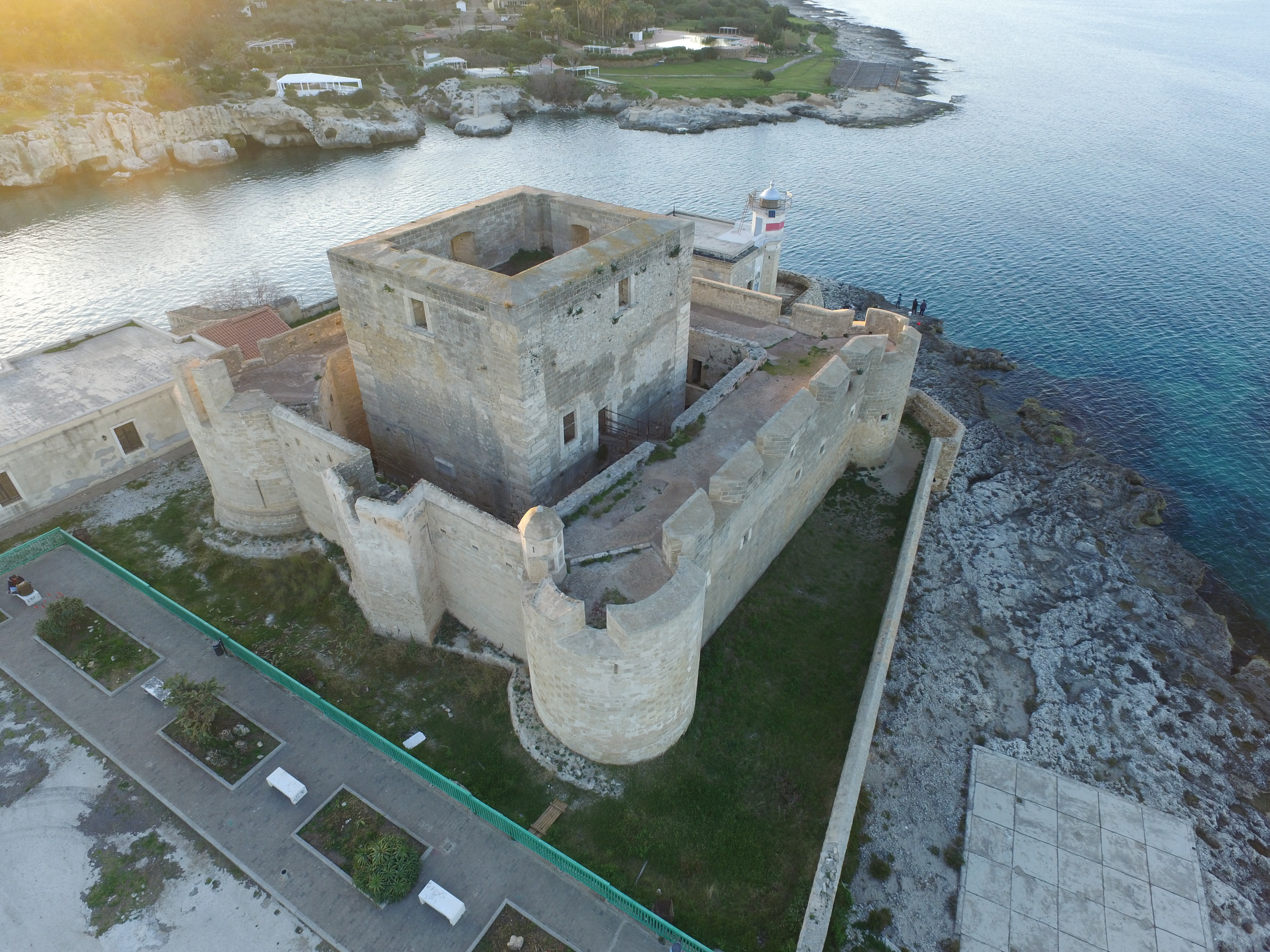
The castle of Brucoli

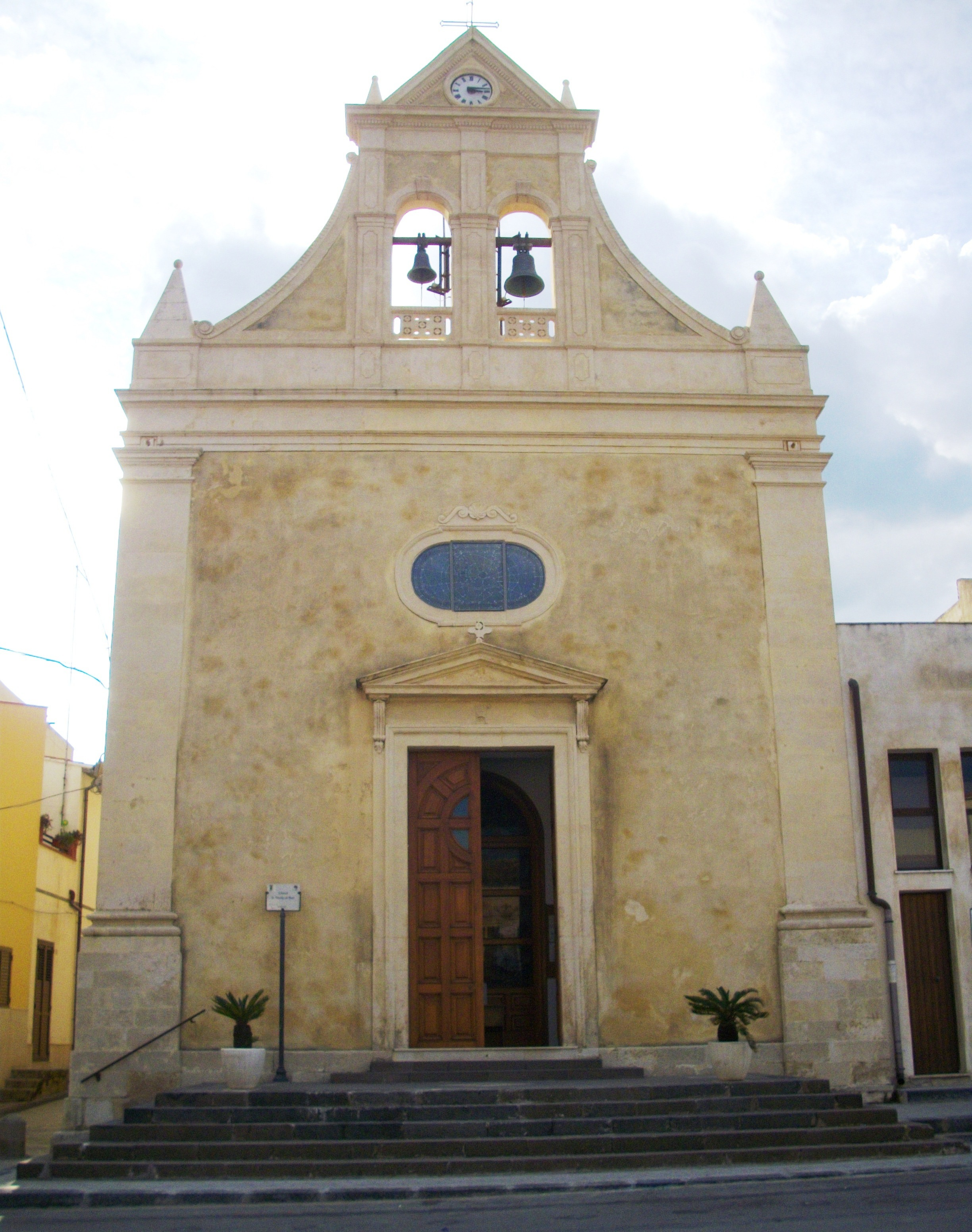
Saint Nicholas church
