= Gulf of Catania =

Inlet in the Mediterranean Sea

Coordinates: 37.4312°N 15.1537°E

The Gulf of Catania (Italian: Golfo di Catania) is an inlet of the Ionian Sea on the eastern coast of the Italian island of Sicily.

Some twenty miles (or thirty-two kilometres) long and some five miles (eight km) wide, the gulf lies between Cape Campolato to the south and Cape Mulini to the north. Mount Etna is close to it, and the Simeto River runs into it below Catania.
