= Augusta, Sicily =

Augusta Austa (Sicilian)
- Comune
- Comune di Augusta
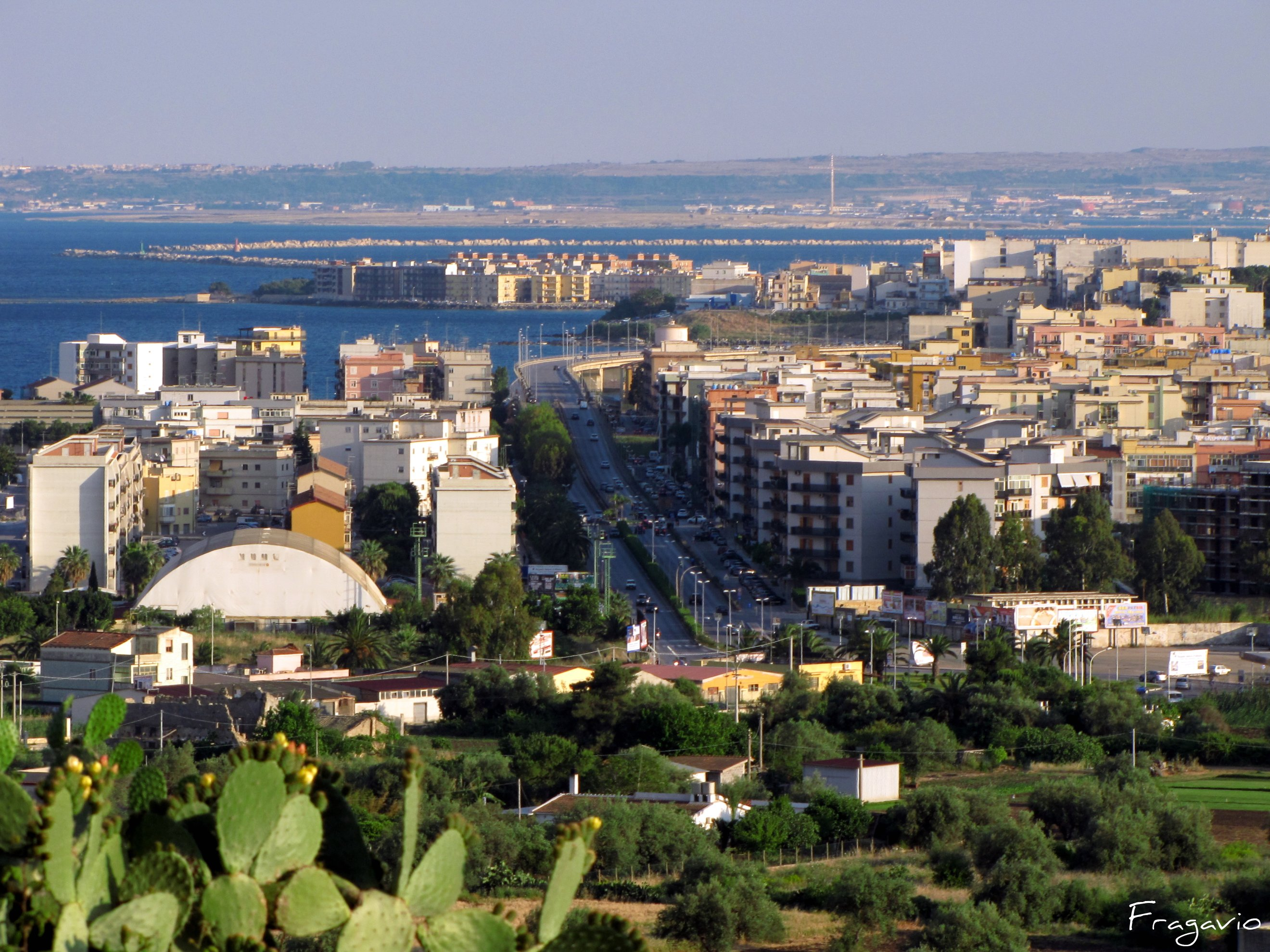

- Coat of arms

- Location of Augusta in Italy Augusta (Sicily)
- Coordinates: 37°15′N 15°13′E
- Country: Italy
- Region: Sicily
- Province: Syracuse (SR)
- Frazioni: Agnone Bagni, Brucoli

Government
  - Mayor: Giuseppe Di Mare (Five Star Movement)

Area
  - Total: 111.16 km^{2} (42.92 sq mi)
- Elevation: 15 m (49 ft)

Population (30 November 2017)
  - Total: 35,854
  - Density: 322.54/km^{2} (835.39/sq mi)
- Demonym: Augustani
- Time zone: UTC+1 (CET)
  - Summer (DST): UTC+2 (CEST)
- Postal code: 96011
- Dialing code: 0931
- Patron saint: St. Dominic
- Saint day: May 24
- Website: Official website

Augusta (Italian: [auˈɡusta], archaically Agosta; Sicilian: Aùsta [aˈusta]; Greek and Latin: Megara Hyblaea, Medieval: Augusta) is a town and comune in the province of Syracuse, located on the eastern coast of Sicily (southern Italy). The city is one of the main harbours in Italy, especially for oil refineries (Sonatrach and others as part of the complex Augusta-Priolo) which are in its vicinity.

== Geography ==
The city is situated in the province of Syracuse and faces the Ionian Sea. The old town is an island, made in the 16th century by cutting an isthmus, now connected to the Sicilian mainland by two bridges. One bridge was built around the 12th or 13th century as part of the Frederick II of Swabia Viaduct. And the other, older bridge was built when the city was founded and is called the Porta Spagnola. Augusta is currently home to two ports.

== History ==
Founded 27 centuries ago, Megara Hyblaea is one of the oldest Greek colonies of Sicily. It was destroyed by its rival Syracuse, was raised from its ruins, then taken by the Romans together with Syracuse during the Second Punic War. It remains an archaeological site, a testimony of the organization of a Greek colony of the Archaic period.

Upon the ruins of one of its suburbs, Xiphonia, the city of Augusta was founded in 1232 by Emperor Frederick II. After the Angevin domination, it became part of Aragonese Sicily and, from 1362, it was a fief of Guglielmo Raimondo II Moncada. It returned to be a royal possession (under Spain) in 1560, and was extensively fortified to counter Turkish pirates.

In 1675 its harbor was the site of a naval battle between the Dutch-Spanish and the French fleets. The town suffered a major earthquake and tsunami in 1693.

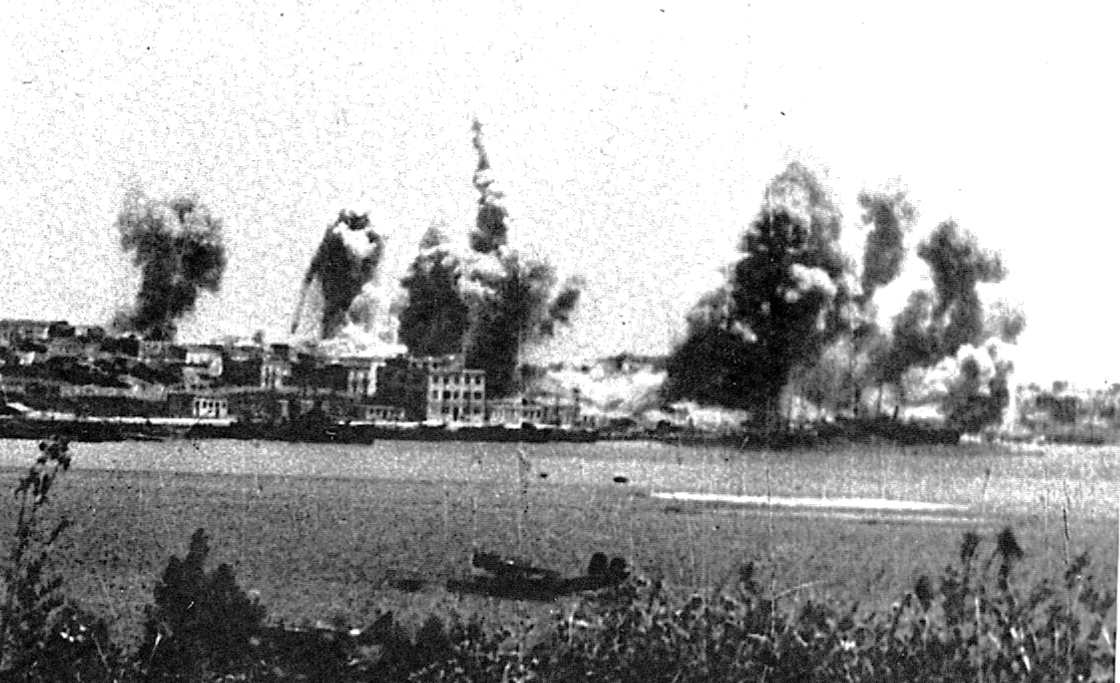
Bombardment of Augusta on 13 May 1943

During World War II Augusta was a hotbed of anti-Mussolini sentiment and anti-fascist sentiment more generally, as was all of Sicily. Because of the strongarm tactics that the Mussolini regime used to subdue Sicily, the fascist regime was very unpopular on the island, including in Augusta. When British and American forces arrived in Sicily, the Sicilians did not regard them as conquering invaders but rather greeted them as "emancipators come to lift the evil burden of fascism from their shoulders." All across Sicily the invading forces were greeted with relief and often with unbridled enthusiasm.

During Operation Husky, the combined British and American effort to dislodge fascist forces from Sicily, the plan was for British forces under General Montgomery to capture Augusta during the first few days of the operation. This part of the operation went entirely according to plan and Augusta was captured on July 13, 1943, by the British Eighth Army, led by Britain's General Montgomery. Almost immediately thereafter British forces began moving north towards Catania.

== Main sights ==
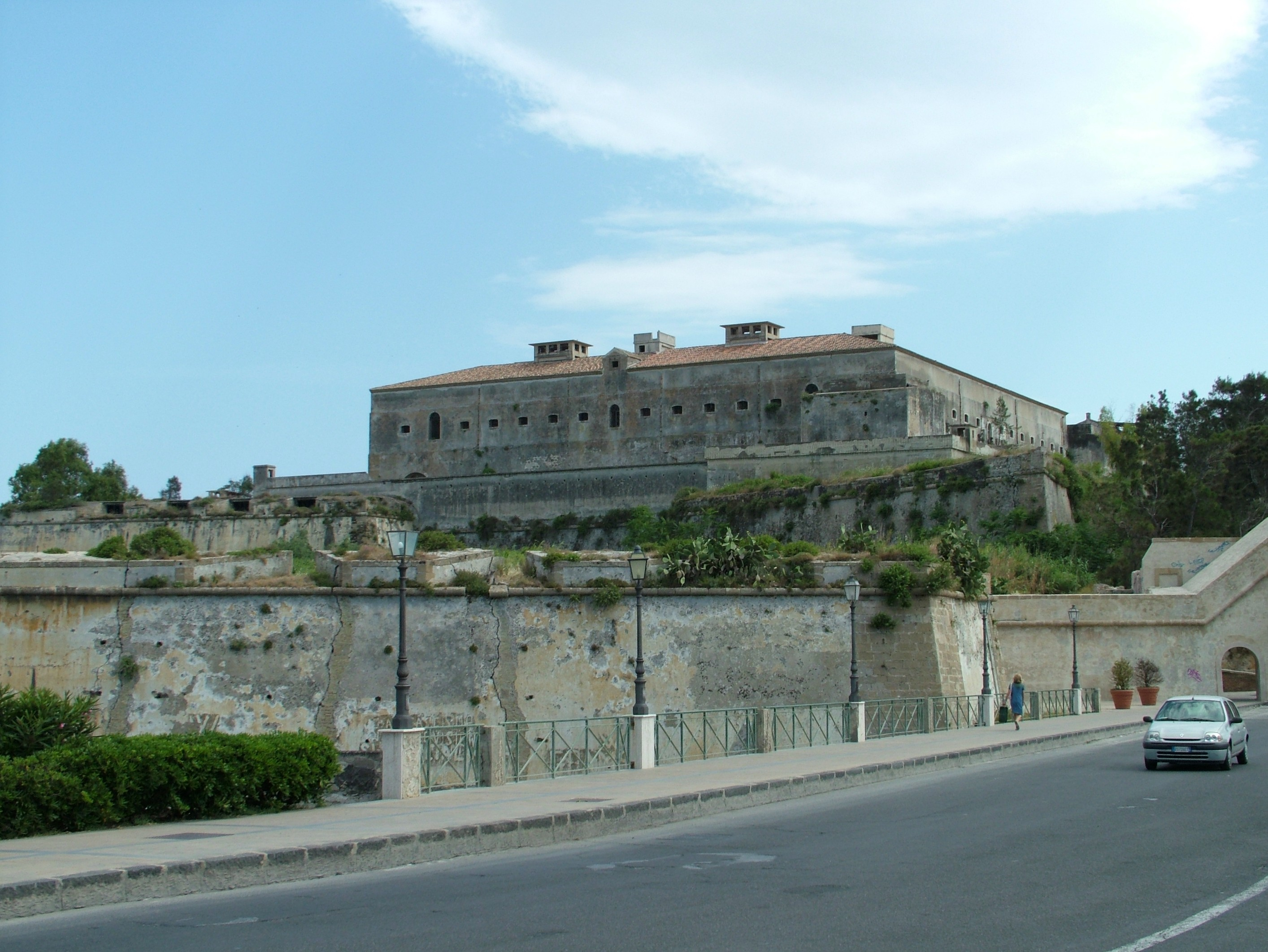
Hohenstaufen Castle

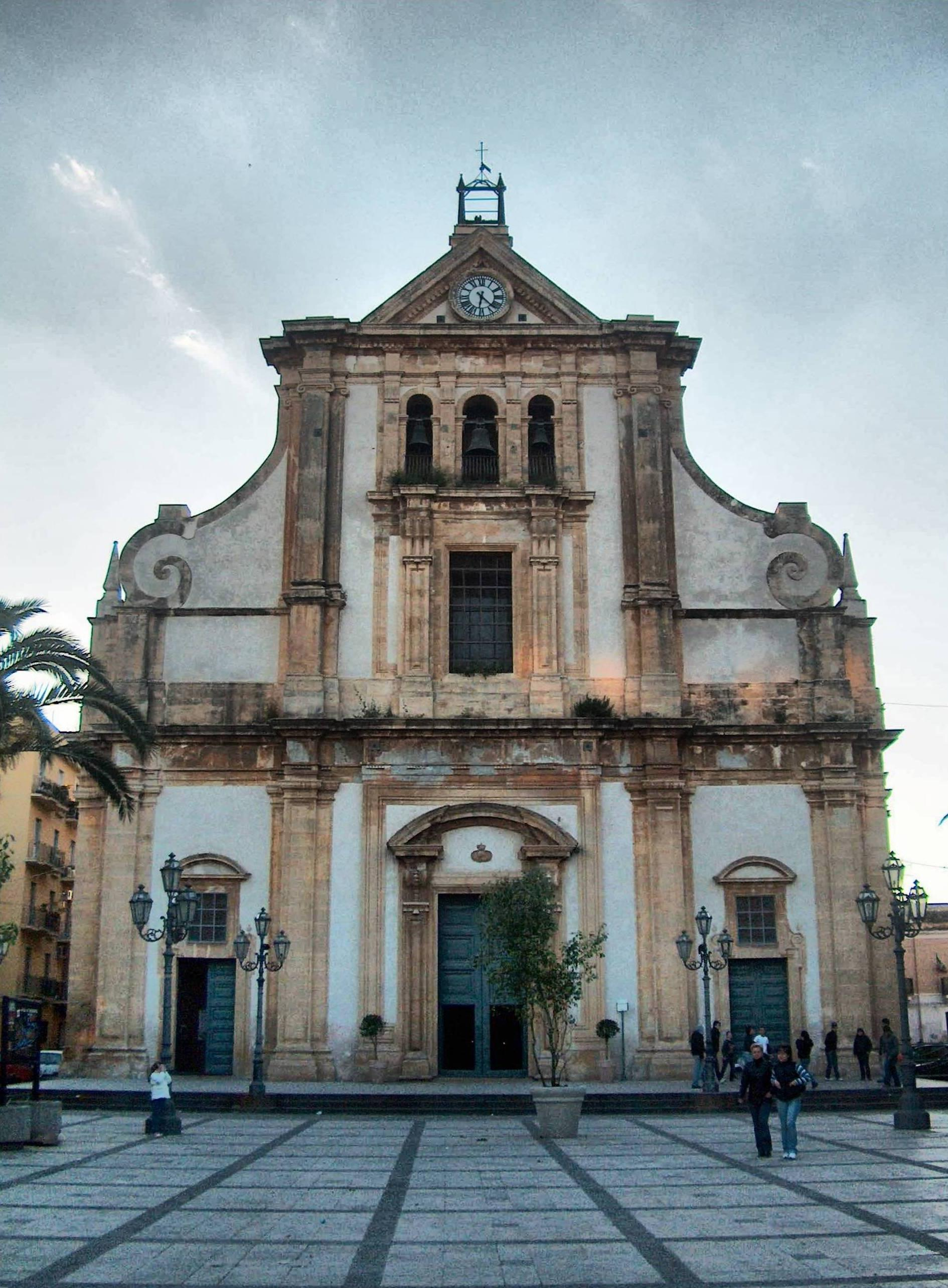
Chiesa Madre (Mother Church)

- Castello Svevo (Hohenstaufen Castle, built c. 1232). It has a square plan of a 62-metre (203 ft) side length, with eight towers
- Capo Santa Croce Lighthouse
- Church of Anime Sante del Purgatorio (S. Nicolò). The Baroque façade is attributed to Filippo Juvarra
- Church of Carmine
- Church of Cristo Re
- Church of Maria Santissima Assunta (Augusta)
- Church of Maria Santissima del Soccorso
- Church of Sacro Cuore
- Church of San Domenico (13th century). The façade is in Neoclassical style
- Church of San Francesco di Paola
- Church of San Giuseppe
- Church of Santa Maria Delle Grazie
- Church of Santa Maria del Soccorso
- Church of San Sebastiano
- Church of Sant'Andrea
- Church of Santa Lucia
- Convent of the Dominican Fathers
- Eremo Adonai
- Forti Garsia e Vittoria
- Hangar dirigibili Augusta
- Kursaal Augusto
- Porta Spagnola
- Ricetta di Malta
- Porta Spagnola (17th century)
- Torre Avalos

== Notable people ==
- Emanuele d'Astorga, composer
- Orso Mario Corbino, physicist
- Epicarmo Corbino, economist
- Giuseppe Di Mare (composer), organist, pianist and composer
- Rosario Fiorello, showman
- Beppe Fiorello, actor
- Alfredo Maria Garsia, Bishop of Caltanissetta
- Marcello Guagliardo Giordani, opera singer (tenor)
- Giovanni Lavaggi, Formula 1 driver
- Roy Paci, musician
- Antonio Scaduto, canoeist
- Riccardo Schicchi, director
- Chiara Strazzulla, writer
- Barbara Tabita, actress
