= 101st =

101st is the ordinal form of the number 101. 101st or One hundred and first may also refer to:

- A fraction, 1/101, equal to one of 101 equal parts

== Geography ==
- 101st meridian east, a line of longitude
- 101st meridian west, a line of longitude
- 101st Street (Manhattan)

== Military ==
- 101st Air Refueling Wing, unit of the Maine Air National Guard
- 101st Battalion (disambiguation)
- 101st Brigade (disambiguation)
- 101st Division (disambiguation)
  - 101st Airborne Division, division of the United States Army
- 101st Regiment (disambiguation)
- 101 Squadron (disambiguation)

== Politics ==
Districts

- Connecticut's 101st House of Representatives district
- Georgia's 101st House of Representatives district
- Florida's 101st House of Representatives district
- Louisiana's 101st House of Representatives district
- Michigan's 101st House of Representatives district
- New York's 101st State Assembly district
- North Carolina's 101st House district
- Pennsylvania's 101st Representative District
- Texas's 101st House of Representatives district

Legislative sessions

- 101st United States Congress
- 101st Delaware General Assembly
- 101st Illinois General Assembly
- 101st New York State Legislature
- 101st Wisconsin Legislature

Other

- One Hundred and First Amendment to the Constitution of India

== See also ==
- 101 (disambiguation)
- 101st kilometre, colloquial phrase for restrictions on freedom of movement in the Soviet Union
  - 101st Kilometer, 2001 Russian drama film
- April 11, 101st day of the year in a standard year
