= 101st Division (disambiguation) =

101st Division most often refers to the 101st Airborne Division of the United States.

101st Division may also refer to:

== Infantry ==
- 101st Division (1st Formation) (People's Republic of China)
- 101st Infantry Division (France)
- 101st Infantry Division (German Empire)
- 101st Jäger Division, Germany, World War II
- 101st Motorized Division "Trieste", Italy, World War II
- 101st Division (Imperial Japanese Army)
- 101st Division (Philippines)
- 101st Guards Rifle Division, Soviet Union
- 101st Rifle Division, Soviet Union
- 101st Infantry Division (Syrian rebel group)

== See also ==
- List of military divisions by number
- 101st Brigade (disambiguation)
- 101st Regiment (disambiguation)
- 101st Battalion (disambiguation)
- 101st Squadron (disambiguation)
- 101st (disambiguation)
