= 101st Regiment =

101st Regiment may refer to:

== Infantry regiments ==
- 101st Regiment of Foot (disambiguation), several units of the British Army
- 101st Grenadiers, a unit of the army of British India
- 101st (Northumbrian) Regiment Royal Artillery, a unit of the British Army
- 101st Infantry Regiment (PA), a unit of the Philippine Commonwealth Army
- 101st Infantry Regiment (United States)
- 101st Regiment "Edmonton Fusiliers", a unit of Canada's Non-Permanent Active Militia from 1908 to 1920

== Armoured regiments ==
- 101 Panzer Regiment, a unit of the Führer Grenadier Brigade of the German Army

== Aviation regiments ==
- 101st Aviation Regiment, US Army
- 101st Fighter-Training Aviation Regiment, a unit of the Yugoslav Air Force

== Cavalry regiments ==
- 101st Cavalry Regiment, a unit of the New York Army National Guard, US Army

== Artillery regiments ==
- 101st Field Artillery Regiment, a unit of the US Army
- 101st Field Artillery Regiment (PA), a unit of the Philippine Commonwealth Army
- 101st (Northumbrian) Regiment Royal Artillery
- 101st Heavy Anti-Aircraft Regiment, Royal Artillery
- 101st Light Anti-Aircraft Regiment, Royal Artillery

== American Civil War regiments ==
- 101st Illinois Infantry Regiment
- 101st Indiana Infantry Regiment
- 101st New York Infantry Regiment
- 101st Ohio Infantry Regiment
- 101st United States Colored Infantry Regiment

== Other ==
- 101st Communications Regiment (Ukraine)

== See also ==
- 101st Squadron (disambiguation)
- 101st Battalion (disambiguation)
- 101st Brigade (disambiguation)
- 101st Division (disambiguation)
