= Lol (disambiguation) =

LOL is an abbreviation for "laughing out loud" in Internet slang, and once "lots of love" in letter writing.

Lol, lol, LoL, or LOL may also refer to:

== Film and television ==
- LOL (2006 film), a film by Joe Swanberg
- LOL (Laughing Out Loud), a 2008 French comedy movie starring Christa Theret and Sophie Marceau
- LOL (2012 film), an American remake of the 2008 French film starring Miley Cyrus and Demi Moore
- "LOL" (Californication), an episode of Californication
- LOL (format), an international reality television format competition of comedians from each country based on a 2016 original Japanese series
  - LOL: Last One Laughing Naija, Nigerian TV series
  - LOL: Last One Laughing Philippines, Philippine TV series
  - LOL: Last One Laughing UK, British TV series
- LOL (web series) (2009)
- Lorraine "Lol" Jenkins, a character in This Is England
- Lunch Out Loud, a Philippine noontime variety show broadcast on TV5
- Lol:-), a Canadian dialogue-less comedy series

== Business ==
- Laugh Out Loud Productions (LOL!), a comedy company founded by Kevin Hart
- Liberating Ourselves Locally, a hackerspace/makerspace in Oakland, California

== Games ==
- LOL (video game), a 2007 game for the Nintendo DS
- L.O.L.: Lack of Love, a 2000 game for the Sega Dreamcast
- LoL, or League of Legends, a 2009 multiplayer online video game

== Music ==
=== Groups ===
- Lol (Japanese group), a performance group
- Lords of Lyrics (L.O.L.), a Los Angeles–based hip-hop group formed in 1992

=== Albums ===
- LOL (Blog 27 album) (2005)
- LOL (Basshunter album) (2006)
- LOL (GFriend album) (2016)

=== Songs ===
- "LOL!" (Meisa Kuroki song) (2010)
- "LOL", by Mabel from About Last Night... (2022)
- "LOL", by Sinai Rose, appeared in Kidz Bop 16 (2009)
- "LOL (Laugh-Out-Loud)", by NCT 127 from 2 Baddies (2022)

== People with the given name ==
- Lol Mahamat Choua (1939–2019), a Chadian politician and president
- Lol Coxhill (1932–2012), an English saxophonist
- Lol Crawley (born 1974), an English cinematographer
- Lol Creme (born 1947), an English musician, member of 10cc and Godley & Creme
- Lol Morgan (born 1931), a former professional footballer and manager
- Lol Tolhurst (born 1959), a former member of rock band The Cure
- Lol Solman (1863–1931), a Canadian businessman

== Places in South Sudan ==
- Lol State
- Lol River

== Other uses ==
- Loyal Orange Lodge, a Protestant fraternal organisation
- LOL, lymph-obligatory load, a medical acronym
- .lol, an Internet top-level domain
- LOL, IATA code and FAA LID for Derby Field, Nevada, United States
- lol, ISO 639-2 and -3 codes for the Mongo language, spoken by several of the Mongo peoples in the Democratic Republic of the Congo
- LOL, short for lysergol.

== See also ==
- 101 (disambiguation)
- IOI (disambiguation)
- IOL (disambiguation)
- LOL memory (Little Old Lady memory), or core rope memory, NASA software literally woven by female workers in factories
- L.O.L. Surprise!, a line of children's toys
- LOLCODE, a high-level esoteric programming language
- Loll (disambiguation)
- Lolol, a Chilean commune and town in Colchagua Province, O'Higgins Region
