= Alexander Leroy Hawkins =

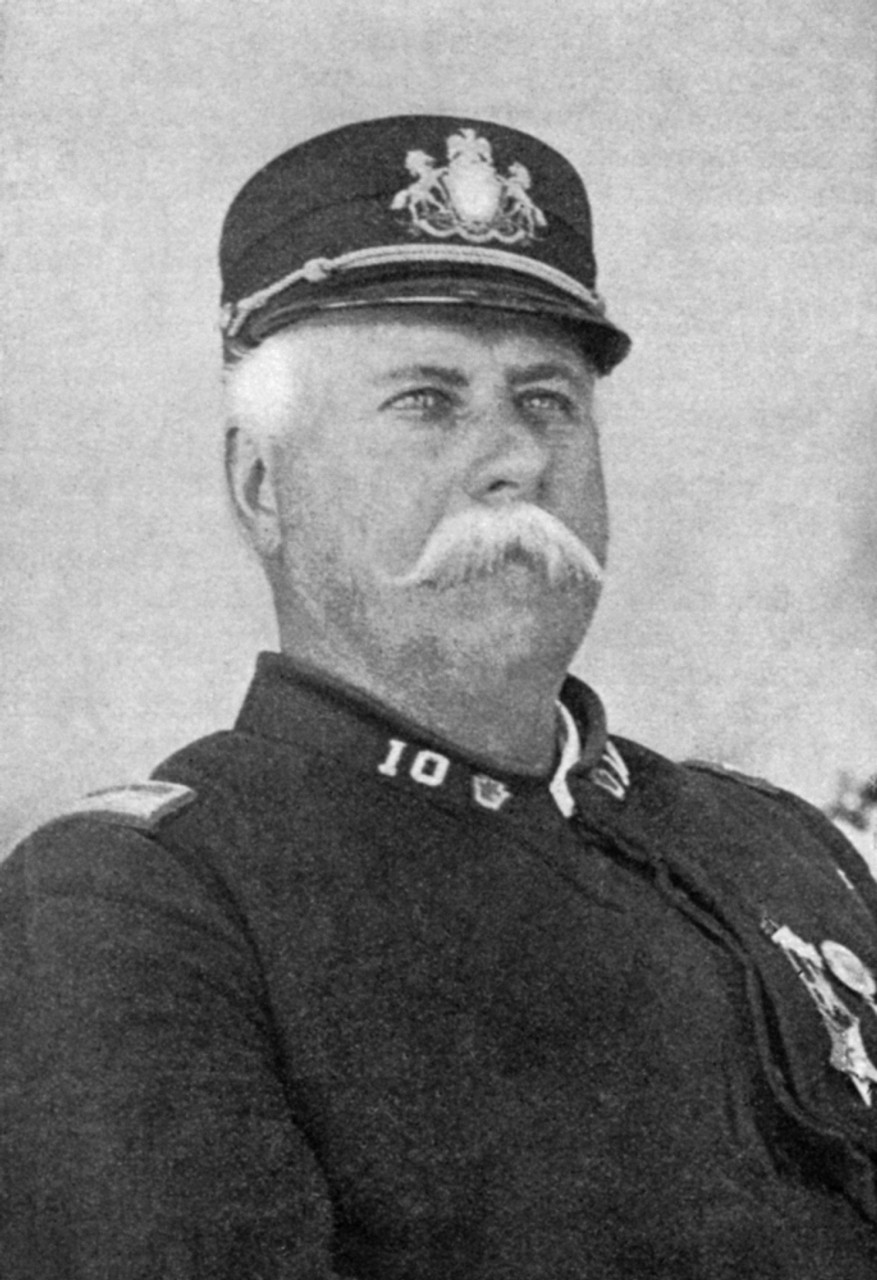
- Hawkins in 1898
- Born: September 6, 1843; Washington County, Pennsylvania, U.S.
- Died: July 18, 1899 (aged 55); At sea, near Yokohama, Kanagawa Prefecture, Japan
- Spouse: Cynthia H. Greenfield
- Military career
- Allegiance: United States
- Branch: United States Army; Pennsylvania National Guard
- Service years: 1862–1866; 1877–1899
- Rank: Colonel
- Units: 15th Pennsylvania Cavalry Regiment; 101st United States Colored Infantry Regiment; 10th Pennsylvania National Guard Regiment
- Commands: 10th Pennsylvania Volunteer Infantry Regiment
- Conflicts: American Civil War; Morewood massacre Homestead strike Spanish–American War: Pacific Theater; Battle of Malate; Battle of Manila

Alexander Leroy Hawkins (September 6, 1843 – July 18, 1899) was an American Colonel of the Spanish–American War. Being a well-known and respected figure of Washington County, Pennsylvania, he commanded the 10th Pennsylvania Volunteer Infantry Regiment until dying at sea a year after the war.

== American Civil War ==
Alexander was born on September 6, 1843, at a farm between the border of Washington and Greene County as the son of James Crawford and Margaret (née Wise). He was also the great-grandson of Thomas Hawkins, who served in the American Revolutionary War as a sergeant. After attending local schools as a child, Hawkins would attend George's Creek Academy at Fayette County, Pennsylvania, and during his college career, would attend Waynesburg College in 1860. He would quit his studies on August 7, 1862, however to enlist as a private within Company K of the 15th Pennsylvania Cavalry Regiment and transferred to Company I on March 1, 1863. Promoted to corporal on May 12, 1863, he fought through the Army of the Cumberland, he was promoted to first lieutenant in August 1864 but was discharged from the regiment September 1, 1864, as Hawkins then received a commission for the 101st United States Colored Infantry Regiment. He was made captain and aide to Clinton B. Fisk until he was honorably discharged on January 21, 1866.

== Civilian and National Guard Service ==
He would spend the next two years in the drug business and would later purchase a farm at Washington County to specialize in livestock and wool. A member of the Republican Party, Hawkins was elected chairman of the party's organization within Washington County. From 1875 to 1978, he would serve as county treasurer and the burgess of East Washington, Pennsylvania. Despite this though, Hawkins would continue to have an interest in military affairs and around this time, Company H of the 10th Infantry Regiment of the Pennsylvania National Guard was considered to be disbanded due to organizational issues. He would take command of the company beginning on January 1, 1877, as captain and was promoted to colonel in February 1879. His leadership of the company was unusually cordial and mutually respectful which would lead to the regiment be considered to be one of the most effective in the state. Hawkins partook in the Morewood massacre of 1891 and the Homestead strike of 1892 while commanding the regiment and attended the presidential inaugurations of James A. Garfield, Grover Cleveland and Benjamin Harrison.

== Spanish–American War ==
After President William McKinley called for men as part of the United States Volunteers upon the outbreak of the Spanish–American War, the newly formed 10th Pennsylvania Volunteer Infantry Regiment would be one of many regiments awaiting selection from the federal government to be sent overseas. On April 26, the regiment was selected for active duty and so Company H would meet up with Company K from Waynesburg, Pennsylvania, at Washington, D.C. Officially mustered in on May 12, 1898, Hawkins would head for San Francisco, California, to depart for California to embark to Manila on June 15, 1898. There he would fight in the battles of Malate and Manila. After the 10th Pennsylvania concluded its service and was returning to the United States on July 1, 1899, Hawkins was already infected with a fatal disease and while the regiment hoped that he would live long enough to see his hometown, he would die at sea on July 18, 1899, near Yokohama. He was survived by his son, Frank L. Hawkins who also fought in the same regiment as his father and his daughter, Jessie Benton Hawkins-Darragh.
