= Murad Agha =

Beylerbey of Tripoli from 1551 to 1553/4

Beylerbey of Tripoli
- In office August 1551 – 1553/1554
- Appointed by: Sinan Pasha
- Preceded by: Gaspard de Vallier (as Governor of Tripoli)
- Succeeded by: Dragut

Personal details
- Born: c. 1480 Ragusa, Kingdom of Sicily
- Died: c. 1556 (aged 75–76) Tajura, Ottoman Tripolitania

Military service
- Allegiance: Ottoman Empire
- Unit: Barbary corsairs / Ottoman Navy
- Battles/wars: Siege of Tripoli (1551); Attack on Zuwarah (1552)

Murad Agha (Note: Sources use several slightly different variants of his name, including Murād Agha, Murad Aghà, Murad Ağa, Murad Agà, and Morat Aga. In some European sources his name was Italianised as Mortaga, Morataga or Muradaga.) (Arabic: مراد آغا, c. 1480 – c. 1556) was a Sicilian-born Ottoman eunuch and military officer who was the first Beylerbey of Tripoli. He held this position from the capture of the city from the Knights Hospitaller in August 1551 until he was replaced by Dragut in 1553/1554. He was also the ruler of the nearby town of Tajura, where he commissioned the construction of the Murad Agha Mosque.

== Biography ==
Murad Agha was of Italian origin. He was born in around 1480 in Ragusa, Sicily, and at a young age he was captured and enslaved by Turkish pirates. He was taken to the Ottoman capital Constantinople, where he was sold to a keeper of the harem of sultan Selim I and was given the name "Murad". He was castrated as a eunuch, and he became the personal slave of the sultan's favourite, Zulima. At some point he converted from Christianity to Islam.

Murad's military career began after Zulima's death in 1521. He became a corsair and joined the Ottoman Navy, where he attained an officer's rank. He also gained the title of Agha in recognition of his bravery as a military leader. In 1538, Hayreddin Barbarossa sent Murad to Tajura in North Africa to organise local resistance against the Knights Hospitaller who at the time ruled the nearby city of Tripoli. By the following year, Murad was in control of Tajura, and over the next decade there were regular hostilities between the forces of Tajura under Murad's command and the Hospitallers.

In the 1540s, Murad requested assistance from Dragut in order to oust the Hospitallers from the city. Around this time, Jean Parisot de Valette – who had been appointed as Governor of Tripoli – proposed moving the headquarters of the Hospitaller Order from Malta to Tripoli. Murad likely informed Ottoman sultan Suleiman I of these plans, and the latter appears to have been motivated to take Tripoli so as to prevent this from occurring.

In 1551, a large Ottoman force led by admiral Sinan Pasha, governor of Algiers Salah Rais, and Dragut was assembled at Constantinople with the aim of capturing Tripoli, and after attacking Sicily, Malta and Gozo the Ottoman fleet landed in Tripolitania. The residents of Tajura under Murad's command fought alongside the Ottomans in the subsequent siege of Tripoli, which began on 8 August 1551. During negotiations between the besiegers and defenders, Murad urged Sinan to ease the terms of surrender as he was eager to take over the city, and the Hospitallers surrendered Tripoli on 14 August.

Sinan subsequently appointed Murad as Beylerbey of Tripoli. This led to a dispute with Dragut, who had also been promised governorship over the city before he had joined the expedition. Upon Murad's appointment, Dragut left North Africa in protest and sailed to the Tyrrhenian Sea and later to Constantinople with the rest of the Ottoman ships, whose crews had declared that they would only accept him as their commander. In order to placate him, Suleiman offered Dragut governorship of Karlieli instead, and instructed Sinan Pasha to follow Dragut's orders.

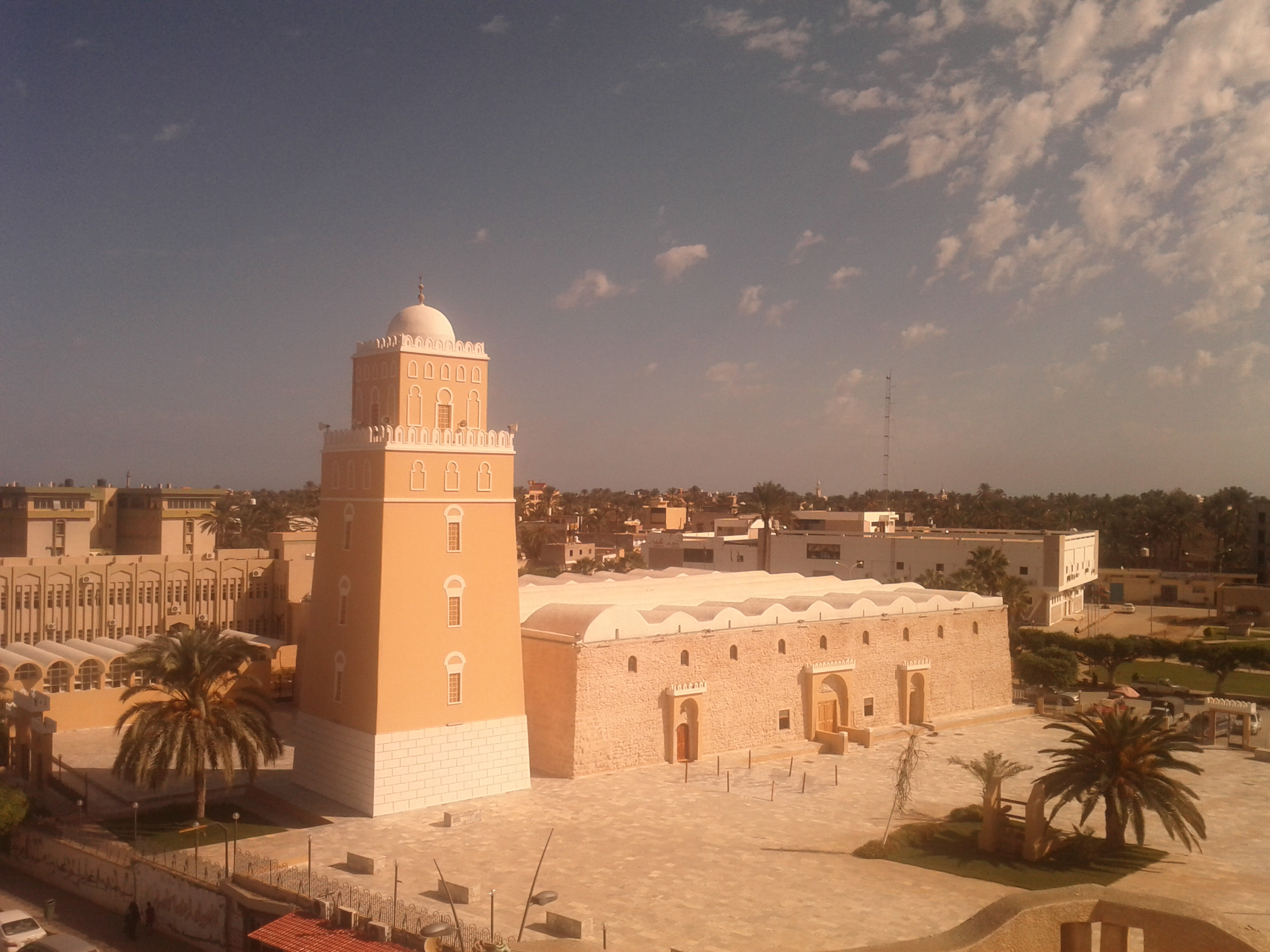
The minaret and prayer hall of the Murad Agha Mosque, as photographed in 2014

Murad successfully consolidated Ottoman control over the region of Tripolitania, made improvements to Tripoli's fortifications, and oversaw the city's economic resurgence. In 1552 he repelled a Hospitaller raid on Zuwarah. Despite these successes, Murad's governorship was short-lived as in 1553–1554, Dragut was appointed as beylerbey in his place. Murad nominally retained the title of pasha and returned to Tajura, where he commissioned the construction of the Murad Agha Mosque. The exact date of his death is unknown, but he likely died in around 1556. Murad was buried in a tomb outside the mosque he built; this tomb was deliberately destroyed by an explosion in 2013.
