= Spolia =

Repurposed building stone for new construction

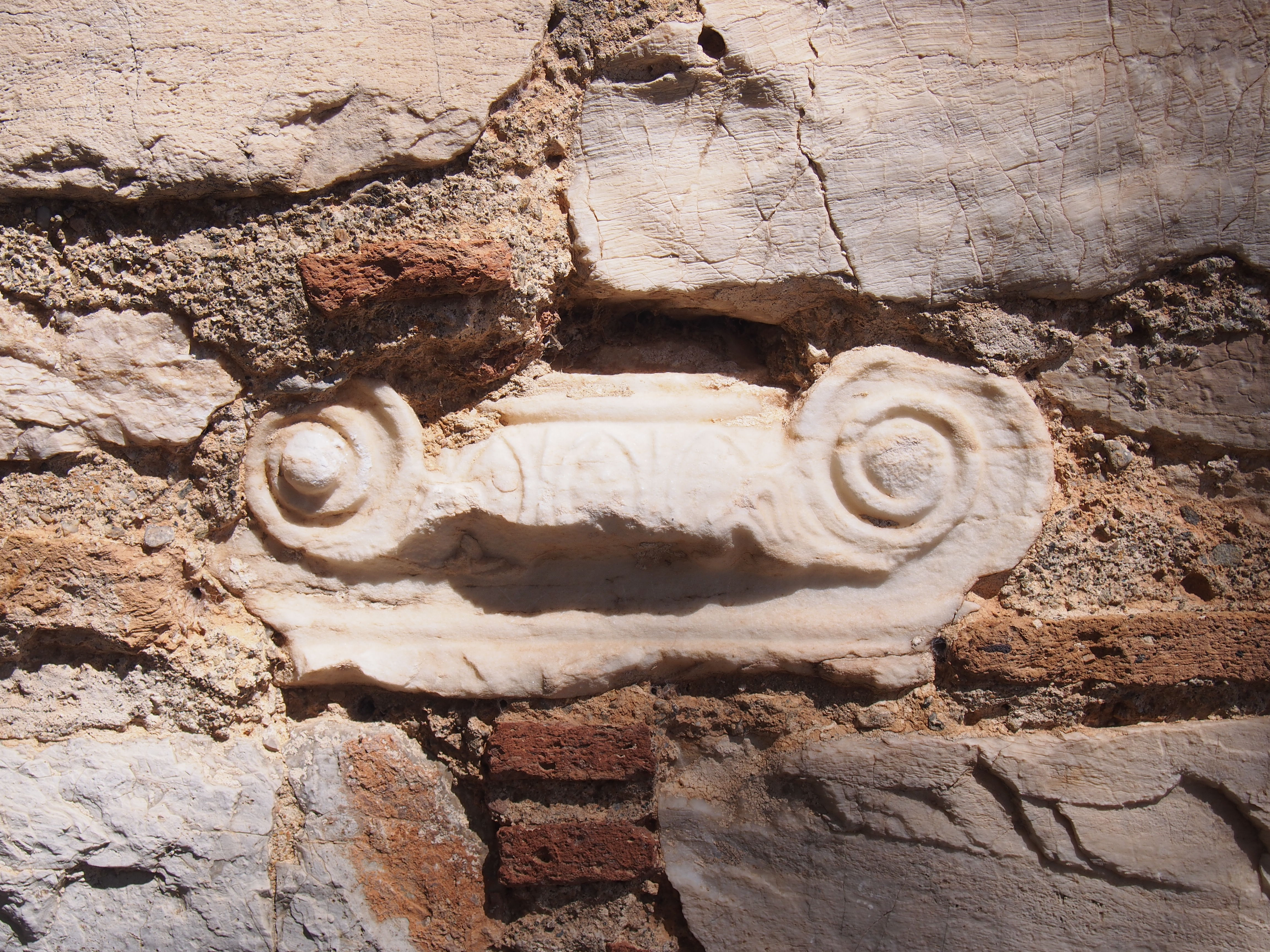
An Ionic capital embedded in the south wall of the Church of St. Peter at Ennea Pyrgoi, Kalyvia Thorikou, Greece

Spolia (Latin for 'spoils'; sing.: spolium) are stones taken from an old structure and repurposed for new construction or decorative purposes. It is the result of an ancient and widespread practice (spoliation) whereby stone that has been quarried, cut and used in a built structure is carried away to be used elsewhere. The practice is of particular interest to historians, archaeologists and architectural historians since the gravestones, monuments and architectural fragments of antiquity are frequently found embedded in structures built centuries or millennia later. The archaeologist Philip A. Barker gives the example of a late Roman period (probably 1st-century) tombstone from Wroxeter that could be seen to have been cut down and undergone weathering while it was in use as part of an exterior wall and, possibly as late as the 5th century, reinscribed for reuse as a tombstone.

== Overview ==
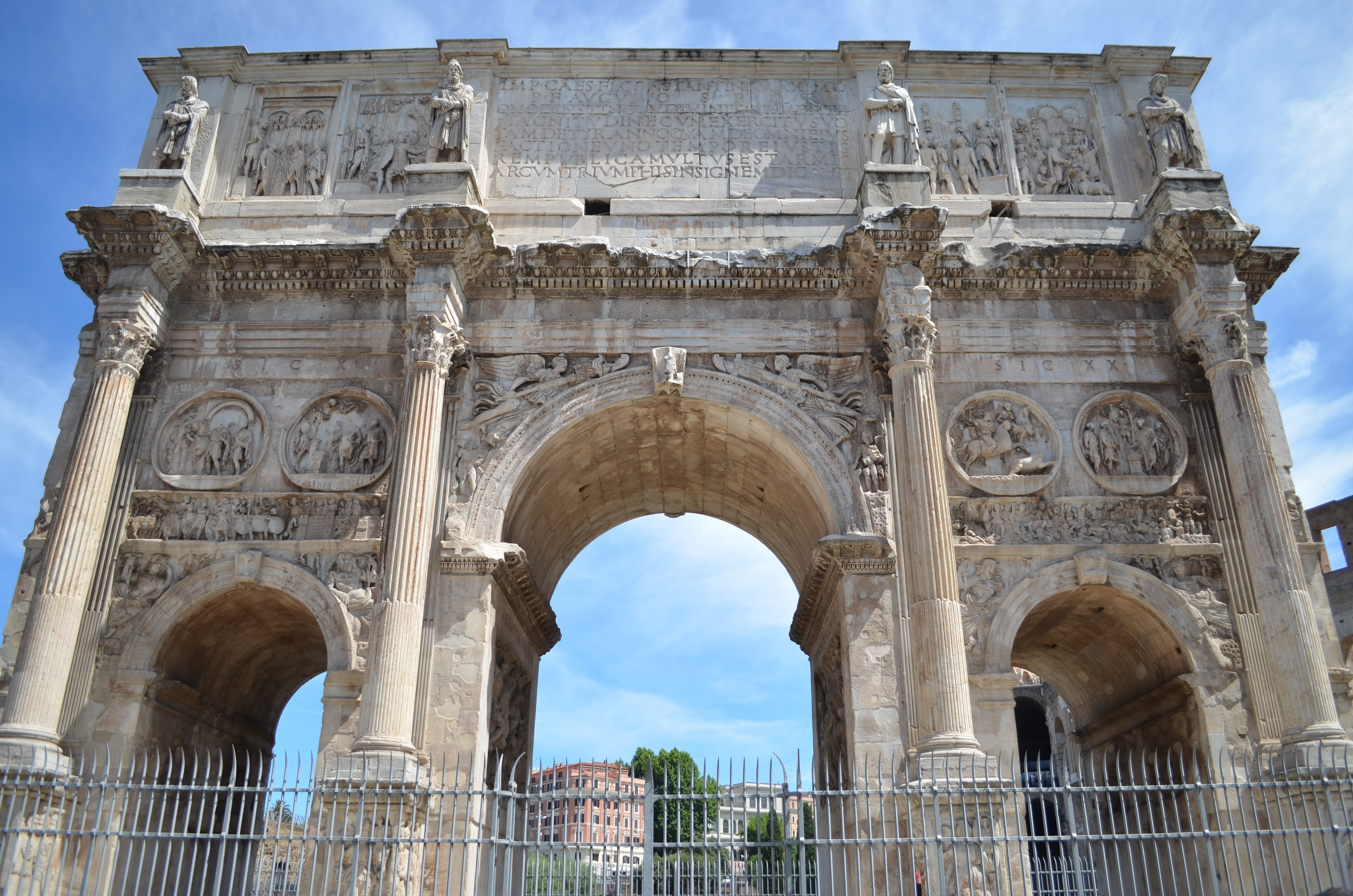
The Arch of Constantine in Rome

Dating of the reliefs on the Arch of Constantine

The practice of spoliation was common in late antiquity. Entire structures, including underground foundations, are known to have been demolished to enable the construction of new ones. According to Baxter, two churches in Worcester (one 7th century and one 10th) are thought to have been deconstructed so that their building stone could be repurposed by St. Wulstan to construct a cathedral in 1084. And the parish churches of Atcham, Wroxeter, and Upton Magna are largely built of stone taken from the buildings of Viroconium Cornoviorum.

Roman examples include the Arch of Janus, the earlier imperial reliefs reused on the Arch of Constantine, the colonnade of Old Saint Peter's Basilica; examples in Byzantine territories include the exterior sculpture on the Panagia Gorgoepikoos church in Athens); in the medieval West Roman tiles were reused in St Albans Cathedral, in much of the medieval architecture of Colchester, porphyry columns in the Palatine Chapel in Aachen, and the colonnade of the basilica of Santa Maria in Trastevere. Spolia in the medieval Islamic world include the columns in the hypostyle mosques of Kairouan, Gaza and Cordoba. Although the modern literature on spolia is primarily concerned with these and other medieval examples, the practice is common and there is probably no period of art history in which evidence for "spoliation" could not be found.

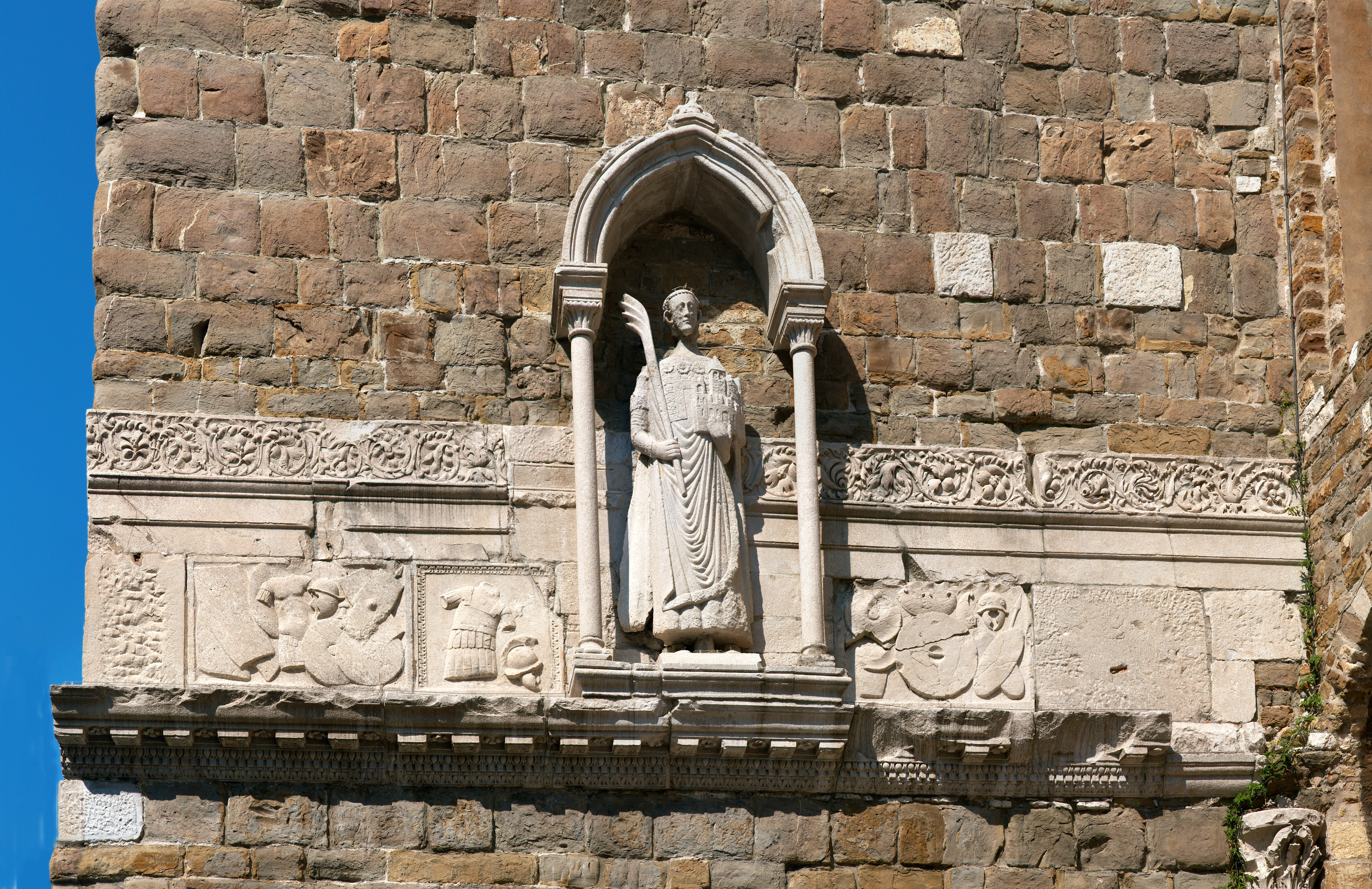
Bell tower of the Trieste Cathedral, Italy

Interpretations of spolia generally alternate between the "ideological" and the "pragmatic". Ideological readings might describe the re-use of art and architectural elements from former empires or dynasties as triumphant (that is, literally as the display of "spoils" or "booty" of the conquered) or as revivalist (proclaiming the renovation of past imperial glories). Pragmatic readings emphasize the utility of re-used materials: if there is a good supply of old marble columns available, for example, there is no need to produce new ones. The two approaches are not mutually exclusive, and there is certainly no one approach that can account for all instances of spoliation, as each instance must be evaluated within its particular historical context.

Spolia had apotropaic spiritual value. Clive Foss has noted that in the 5th century crosses were inscribed on the stones of pagan buildings, as at Ankara, where crosses were inscribed on the walls of the Temple of Augustus and Rome. Foss suggests that the purpose of this was to ward off the daimones that lurked in stones that had been consecrated to pagan usage. Liz James extends Foss's observation in noting that statues, laid on their sides and facing outwards, were carefully incorporated in Ankara's city walls in the 7th century, at a time when spolia were also being built into city walls in Miletus, Sardis, Ephesus and Pergamum: "laying a statue on its side places it and the power it represents under control. It is a way of acquiring the power of rival gods for one's own benefit", James observes. "Inscribing a cross works similarly, sealing the object for Christian purposes".

There has been considerable controversy over the use of Jewish gravestones as pavement materials in several Eastern European countries during and after The Holocaust, as well as by Jordan during its rule over East Jerusalem.

== Gallery ==
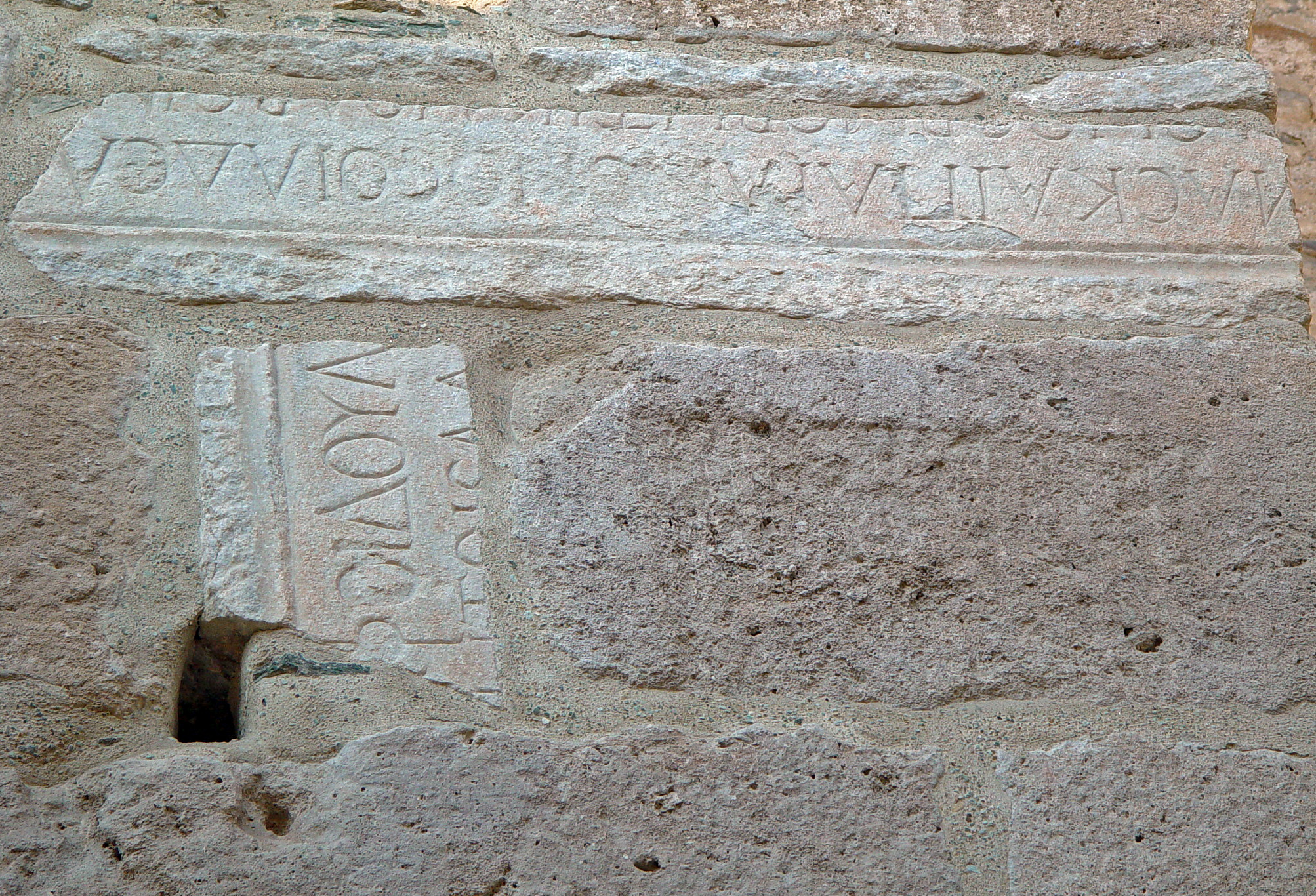
Fragments of Greek inscriptions in the masonry of the Ottoman Heptapyrgion (Yedikule) fortress (1431), Thessaloniki, Greece

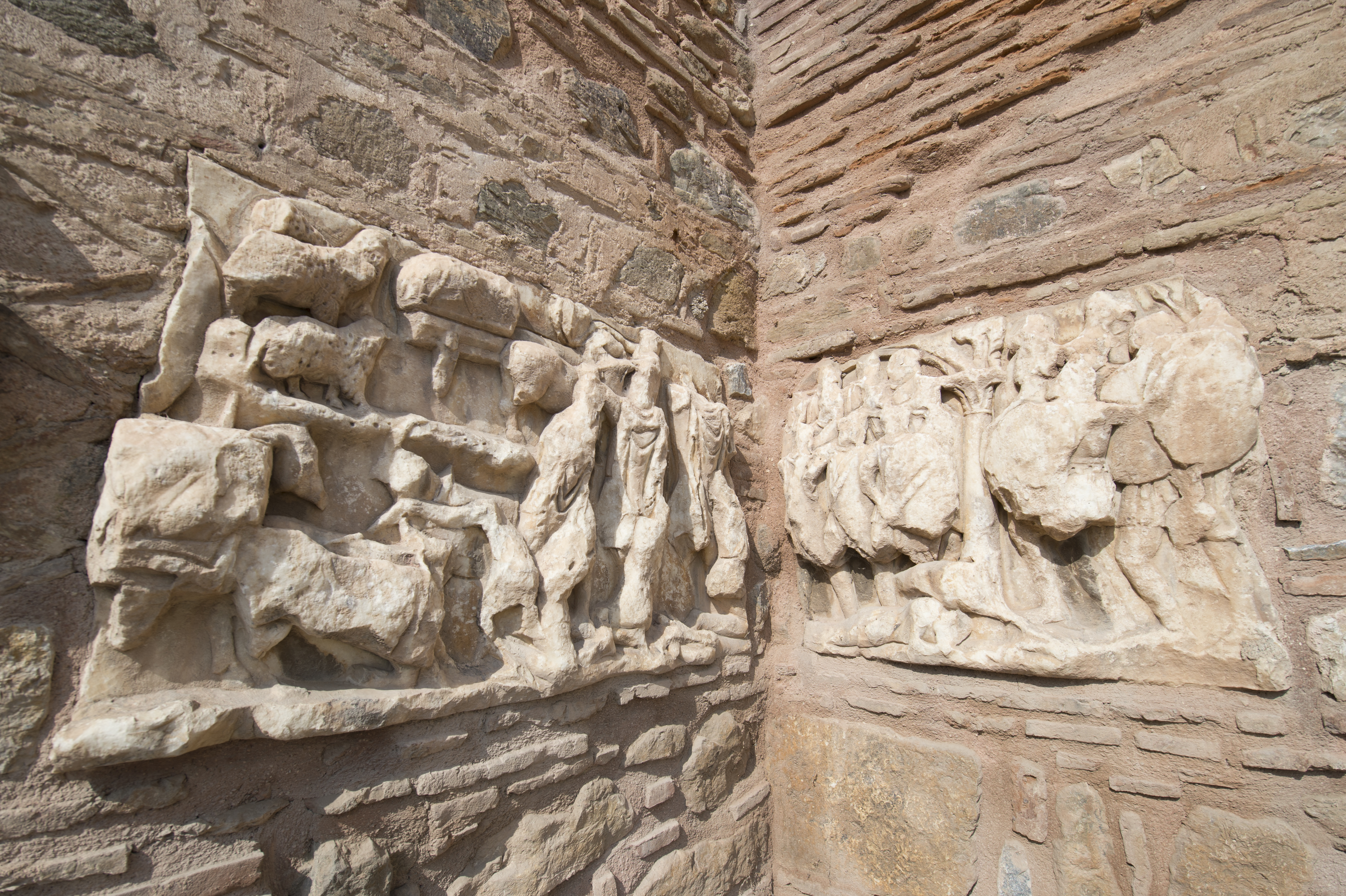
Spolia in the city wall of İznik, Turkey, at Lefke Gate

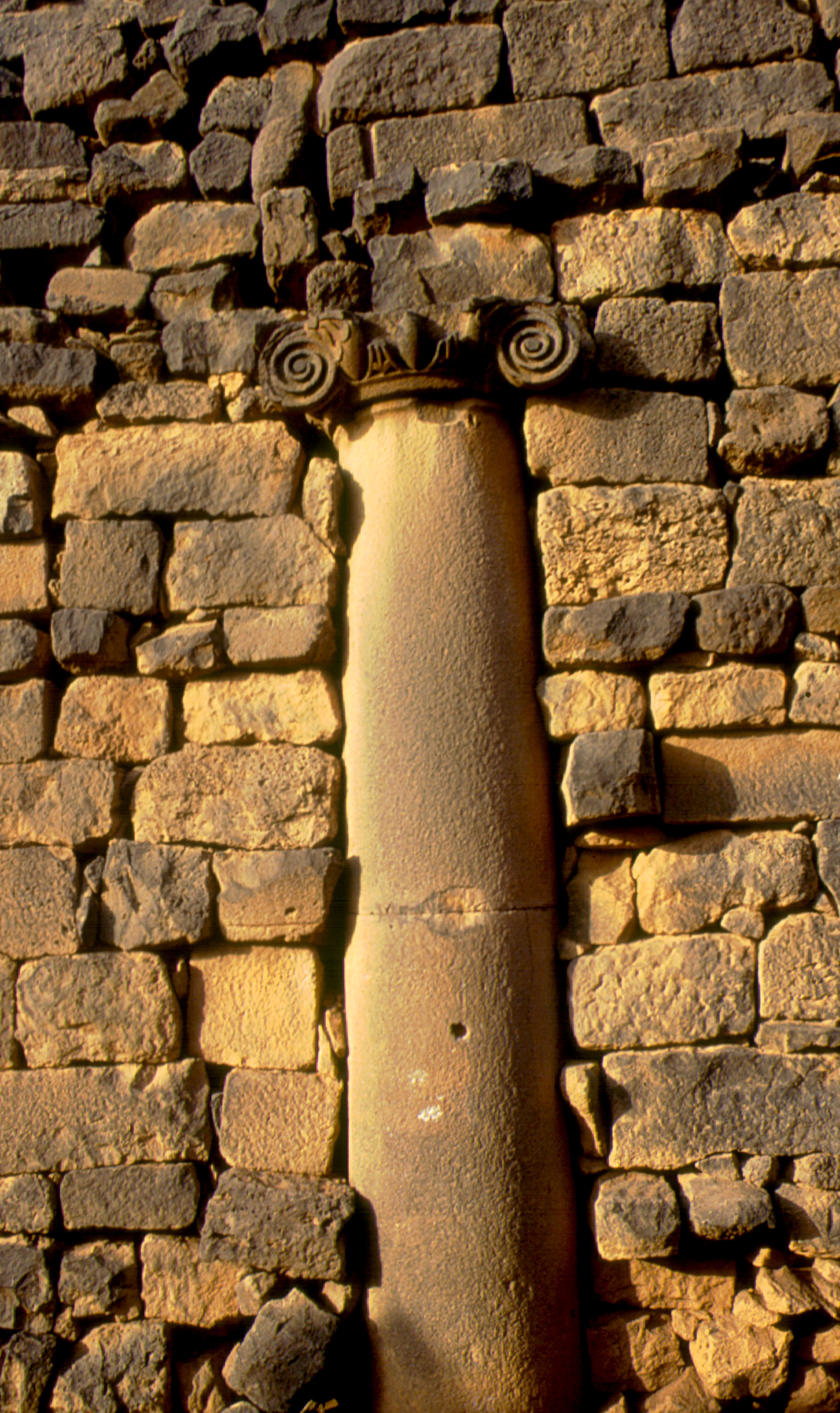
Ionic order column incorporated into a wall, Bosra, Syria

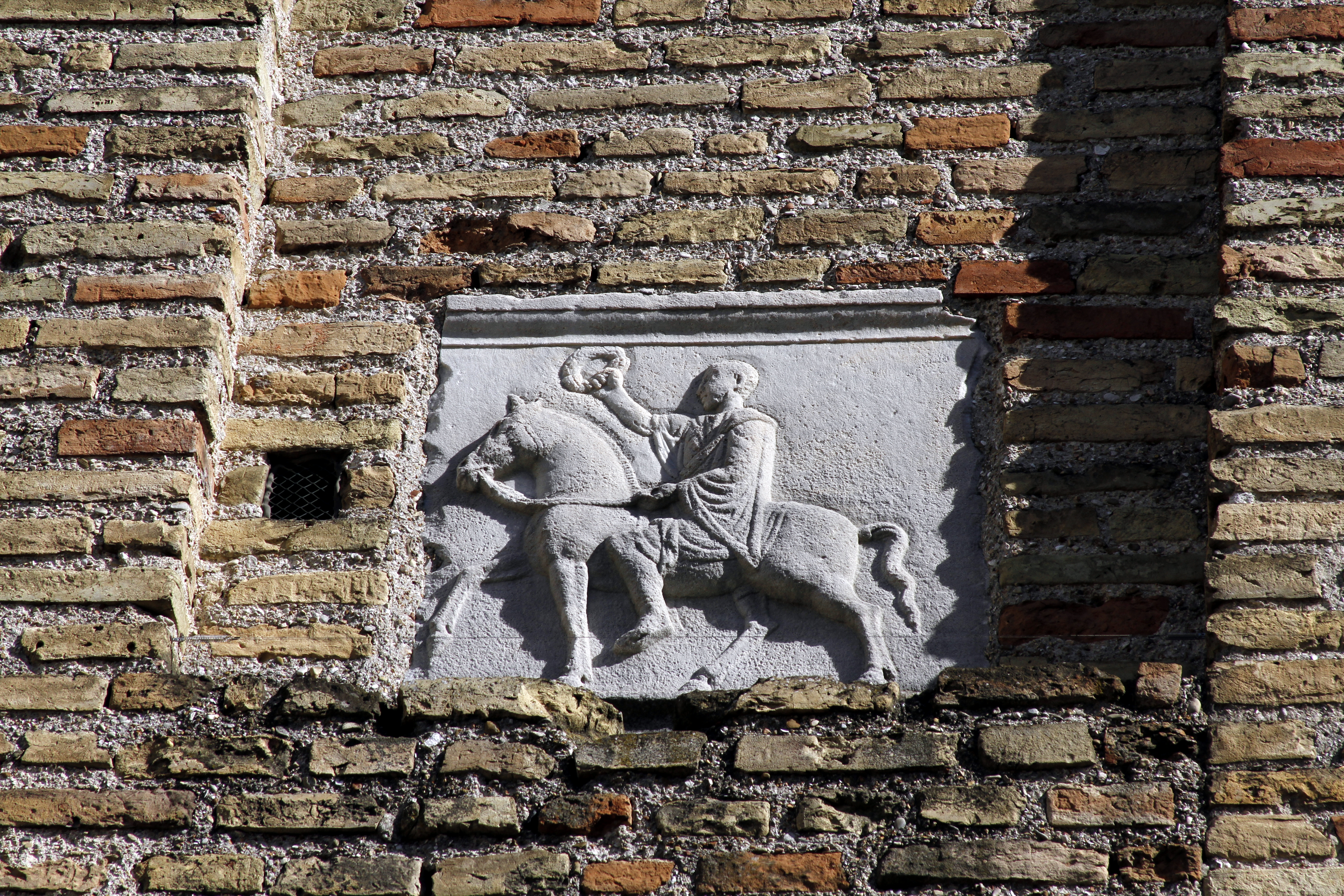
Spolia at Ravenna Baptistery of Neon, Ravenna, Italy

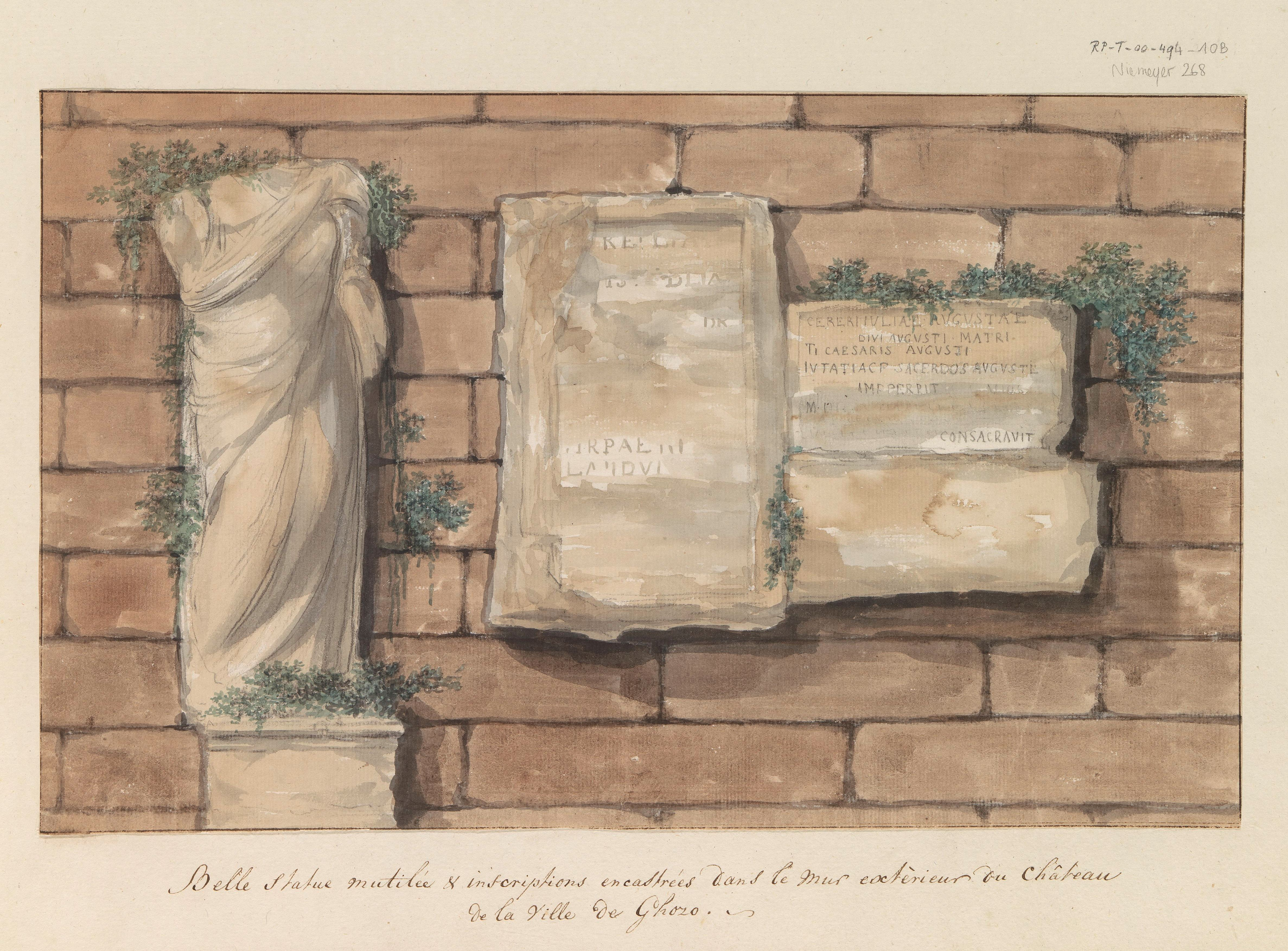
18th-century illustration of a Roman statue and inscriptions reused in the walls of the Cittadella, Gozo, Malta. The statue has since been removed and it is now in the Gozo Museum of Archaeology.

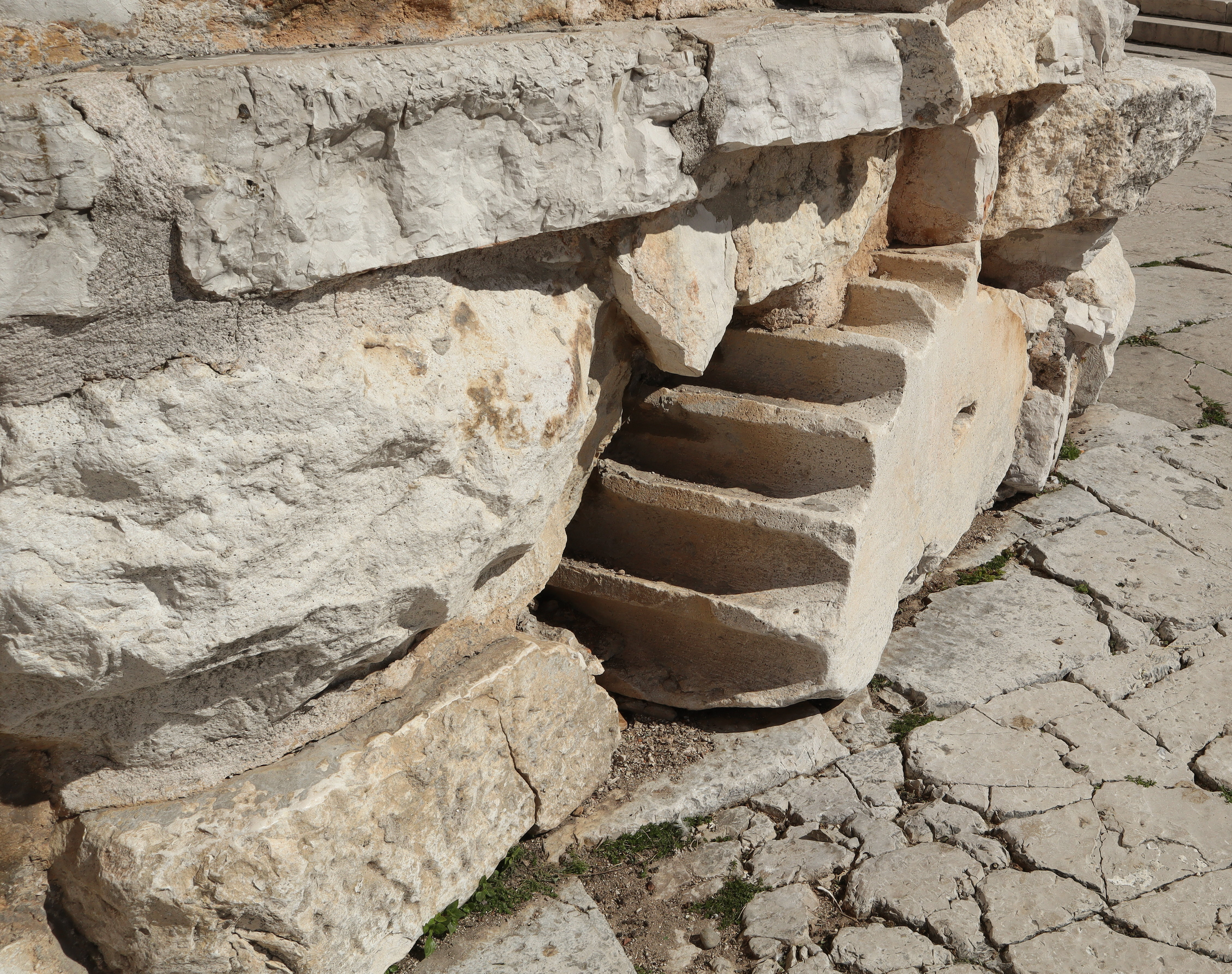
Roman spolia in the foundation of Church of St. Donatus in Zadar, Croatia

Jewish headstones used as part of a wall in Lviv, Ukraine

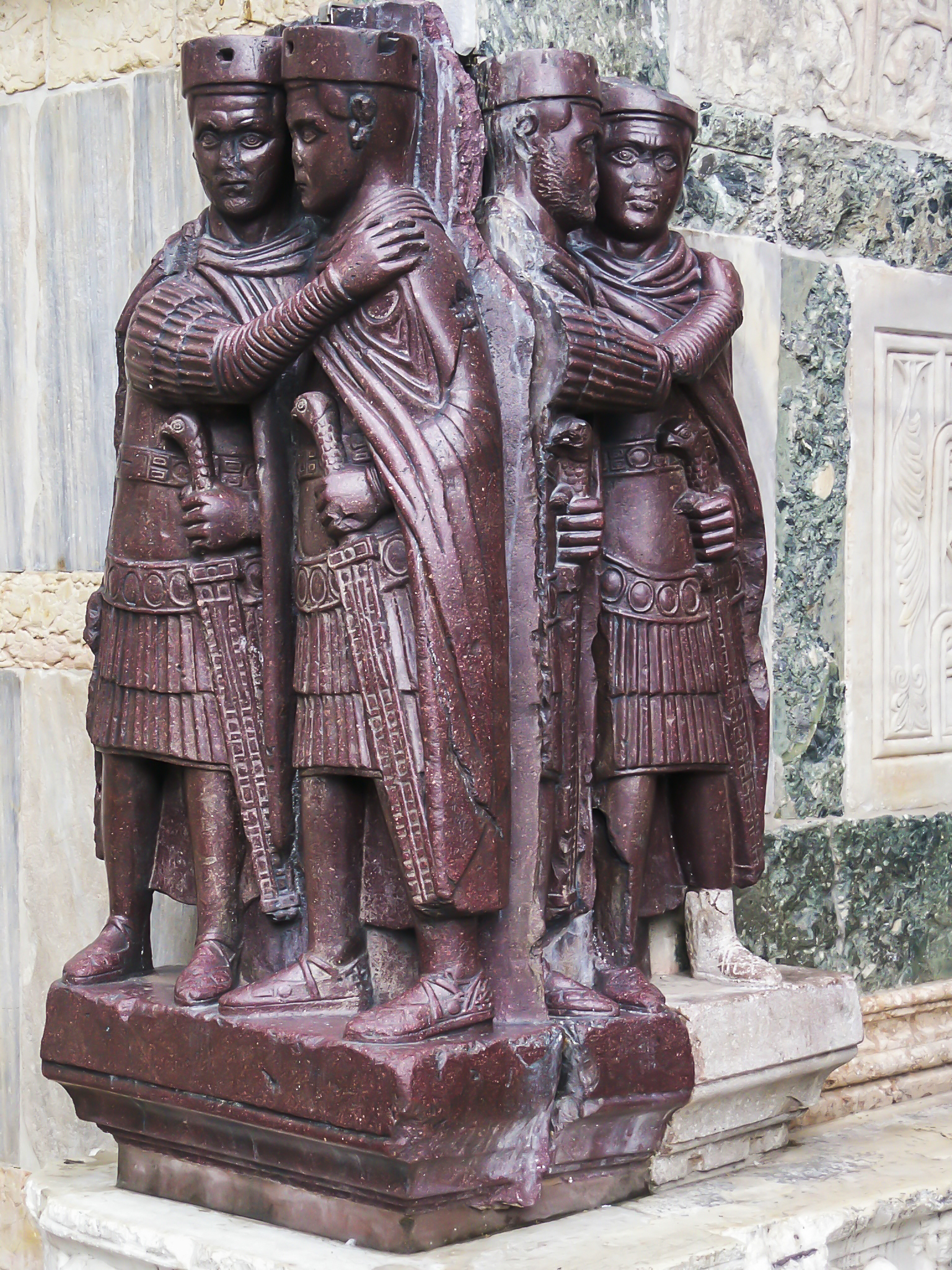
Portrait of the Four Tetrarchs in the corner of St Mark's Basilica, in Venice, Italy, looted by Venetians from Constantinople during the Fourth Crusade

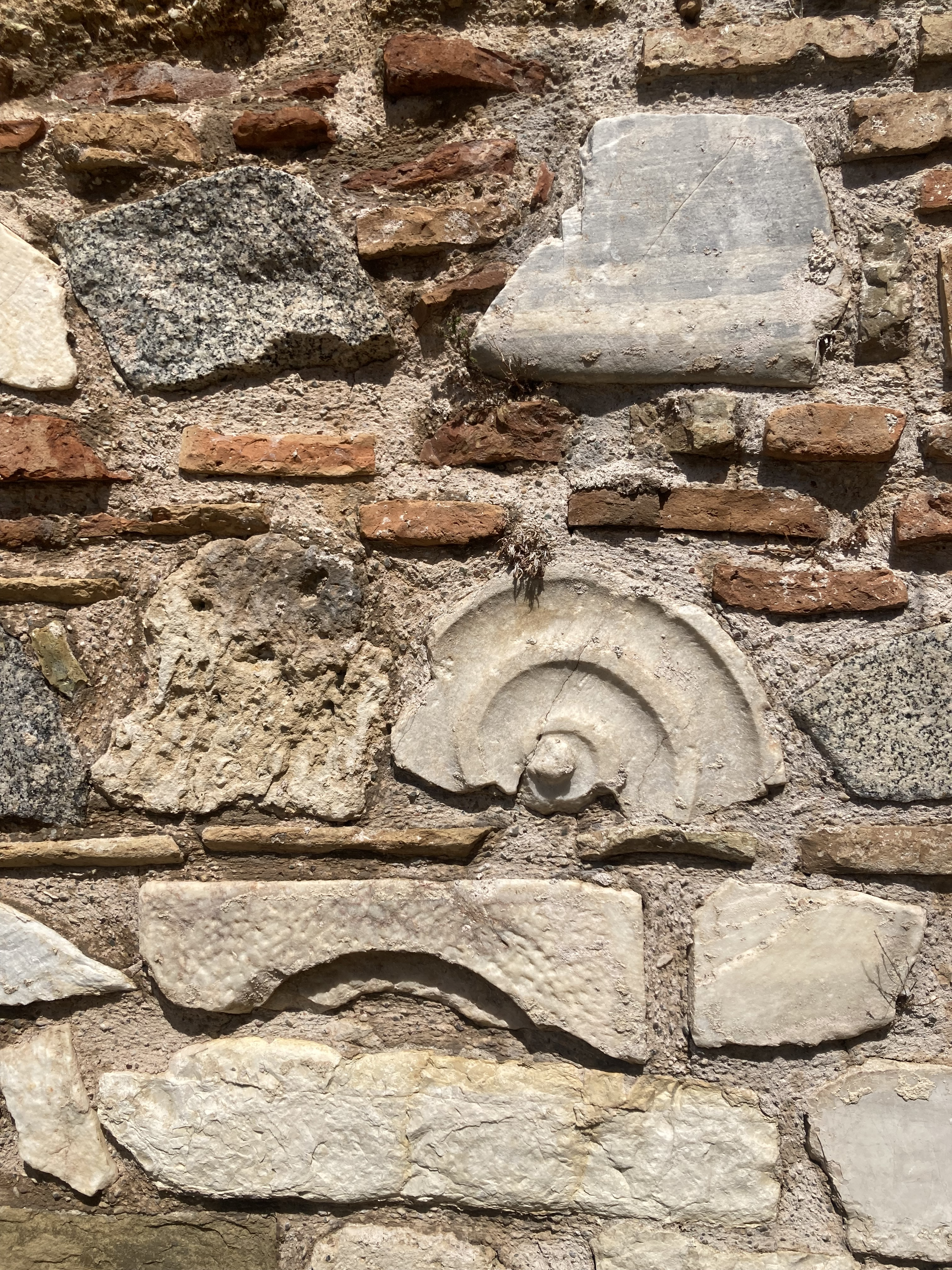
Spolia from the Patras Castle

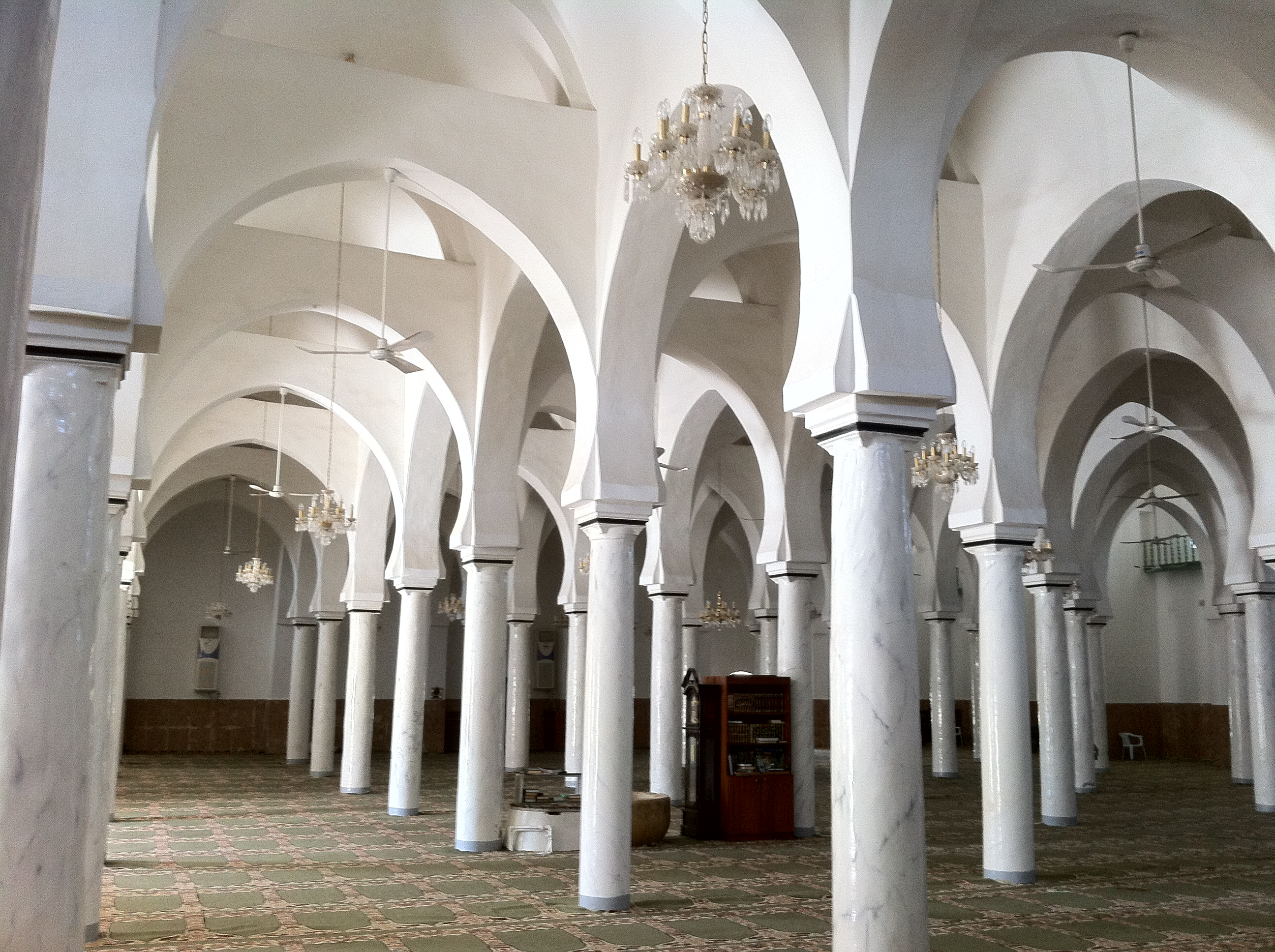
Prayer hall at the Murad Agha Mosque in Tajura, Libya, featuring reused Roman columns

== See also ==
- Crisis of the 3rd Century
- Roman Empire#Tetrarchy (285–324) and Constantine the Great (324–337)
- Dominate
- Palimpsest – the practice of erasing old texts from scarce old vellum to write new text
- Diocletian's Palace – a Roman Imperial palace in Split, re-purposed by later inhabitants as a town
- Slighting
- Spolia opima – armour and arms a Roman general stripped from the body of an opposing commander slain in single combat
- Bricolage – as practiced in modern times from things at hand
