= IOL =

IOL may mean:

- 2-Iodo-LSD, a drug related to LSD
- Iol, an ancient city in Algeria, now Cherchell
- Independent Online, South African news website
- India Optel Limited, an Indian state-owned defence company
- Institute of Linguists, UK, now Chartered Institute of Linguists
- International Linguistics Olympiad, an International Science Olympiad
- Intraocular lens, eye implant
- Ireland On-Line, a former internet service provider (ISP) in Ireland
- The University of New Hampshire InterOperability Laboratory (UNH-IOL), for networking testing
- Induction of labor, the process or treatment that stimulates childbirth

== See also ==
- IOI (disambiguation)
- LOL (disambiguation)
