= 101st Brigade =

101st Brigade may refer to:

== Germany ==
- 101st Panzer Brigade of the Wehrmacht

== Ukraine ==
- 101st Guard Brigade Of General Staff of the Ukrainian Army
- 101st Territorial Defense Brigade, a unit of the Ukrainian Territorial Defense Forces

== United Kingdom ==
- 101st Brigade (United Kingdom), British Army infantry formation 1915 to 1919
- 101st (Howitzer) Brigade, Royal Field Artillery, British Army unit during World War I
- 101st (Queen's Own Royal Glasgow Yeomanry) Brigade, Royal Field Artillery, British Army unit after World War I
- 101st Operational Sustainment Brigade, British Army formation, formed in 1999

== United States ==
- 101st Combat Aviation Brigade, of the 101st Airborne Division
- 101st Sustainment Brigade, of the US Army

== See also ==
- 101st Division (disambiguation)
- 101st Regiment (disambiguation)
- 101st Battalion (disambiguation)
- 101 Squadron (disambiguation)
