= 101st Battalion =

101st Battalion may refer to:

- 101 Battalion (Libya), a military insurgent unit
- 101 Battalion (South Africa), a unit of the South West Africa Territorial Force
- 101st Battalion (Winnipeg Light Infantry), CEF, a unit of the Canadian Expeditionary Force
- 101st Engineer Battalion, a unit of the US Army
- 101st Infantry Battalion, a former unit of the US Army
- 101st Signal Battalion, a unit of the US Army
- Reserve Police Battalion 101, a Nazi German paramilitary formation of Ordnungspolizei
- 101st Battalion (Israel), a unit in the 35th Paratroopers Brigade

== See also ==
- 101st Division (disambiguation)
- 101st Brigade (disambiguation)
- 101st Regiment (disambiguation)
- 101 Squadron (disambiguation)
