= Room 101 (disambiguation) =

Room 101 (pronounced one-o-one) refers to a torture chamber in the Ministry of Love in George Orwell's novel Nineteen Eighty-Four.

Room 101 may also refer to:

== Radio and television ==
- Room 101 (radio series), BBC Radio 5 (1992–1994) and BBC Radio 4 (2023–) programme
- Room 101 (British TV series), BBC Two (1994–2007) and BBC One (2012–2018) programme
- Room 101 (Australian TV series) (2015), SBS One comedy show
- "Room 101" (Doctors), a 2004 television episode

== Music ==
- Room 101 (1982 mixtape) by The Faction
- Room 101 (1984 song) by the Eurythmics from the album 1984 (For the Love of Big Brother)
- Room 101 (1996 song) by Carcass from the album Swansong
- Room 101 (2000 song) from the album Drama (Jamelia album)
- Room 101 (2002 song) from the album Funk (album)
- Room 101 (2017 song) by Tich
- Room 101 (2021 album) by Karmamoi

== Other ==
- Room 101 (brand), a brand of cigars produced by Forged Cigars
- Room 101 (alias), an alias used by vexatious gamer group Patriotic Nigras in Second Life

== See also ==
- 101 (disambiguation)
