= Attack on Zuwarah =

Attack on Zuwarah (1552)
- Part of the Ottoman–Habsburg wars
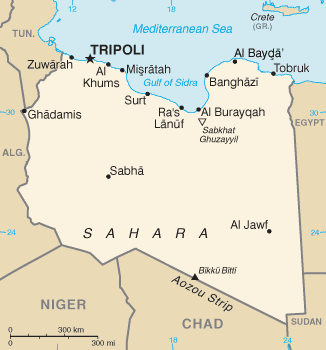
- Zuwarah on the west of Libya.
Date	18 August 1552
Location	Zuwarah
Result	Ottoman victory

Belligerents
(Sovereign Military Order of Malta) Hospitaller Malta	Ottoman Empire

Commanders and leaders
(Sovereign Military Order of Malta) Leone Strozzi (WIA) (Sovereign Military Order of Malta) Tommaso Cilia (Sovereign Military Order of Malta) Guimeran (Sovereign Military Order of Malta) De Valette	Murad Agha

Strength
1,300 men 16 Galleys	4,000 men

Casualties and losses
Heavy	Unknown

The Attack on Zuwarah was a military expedition launched by Knights Hospitallers of Malta to sack the Libyan city of Zuwarah. The attack ended in a fiasco for the Maltese knights, who sustained heavy losses.

== Background ==
After the Ottoman Conquest of Tripoli in 1551, the loss created anger in Malta. After the Maltese garrison leader, Gaspard de Vallier, arrived in Malta, he was heavily rebuked, stripped of the habit of the order, and imprisoned. In the spring of 1552, there were rumors spreading in Malta regarding the Ottoman invasion. The Knights began recruiting from the population, which was capable of bearing arms. After spring had passed, the rumor had died, and the Knights began to resume offensive operations against the Barbary Coast. The Knights of Malta were in shortage of sailors and laborers for the work in fortifications. The Knights targeted the city of Zuwarah.

== Attack ==
On August 6, 1552, a fleet of 16 galleys carrying 300 knights and 1,000 Maltese soldiers, led by Leone Strozzi, left Malta and sailed towards Zuwarah. On the night of the 18th, the Maltese made a landing. The master, Tommaso Cilia, dispatched some of the Maltese disguised as Moors to explore the area and report to the commanders Guimeran and De Valette. Tommaso Cilia also reported to Strozzi and the commanders that there were many tents and fires that could be seen, which seemed to him like an army encamped, but the commanders judged it to be a horde of Arabs and neglected it.

The Maltese then proceeded to assault and sack the city, committing atrocities to the inhabitants. In the middle of the massacres, the Ottoman army was encamping outside, which was mistakenly judged by the knights to be a horde of Arabs earlier. The Ottoman forces were about 4,000 men led by the Murad Agha. The Ottomans fought the knights in the middle of the city. The knight fought bravely but failed to turn the tide of the battle; Strozzi was wounded in the fight and almost killed but was saved by some knights.

Seeing this, the knights retreated and were chased by the Ottomans. The knights fought bravely but sustained heavy losses during the retreat. Many were exposed to heavy fire. Reaching the galleys, the knights formed a phalanx position to cover the re-embarking. The knights managed to repel the Ottoman cavalry, but after the arrival of Ottoman muskets, the knights retreated to the waters, where many of them were killed. Few survived the expedition.

== Aftermath ==
The news of the defeat reached Malta, which created sorrow, especially for the Grand Master of Hospitallers, Juan de Homedes, who considered it a great blow to the Order.

== Sources ==
- Alexander Sutherland (1831), The Achievements of the Knights of Malta, Vol II.
- Vincenzo Busuttil (1894), A Summary of the History of Malta.
- Giovanni Antonio Vassallo (1854), Storia di Malta.
