= Murad Agha Mosque =

Mosque in Tajura, Libya

- جامع مراد آغا
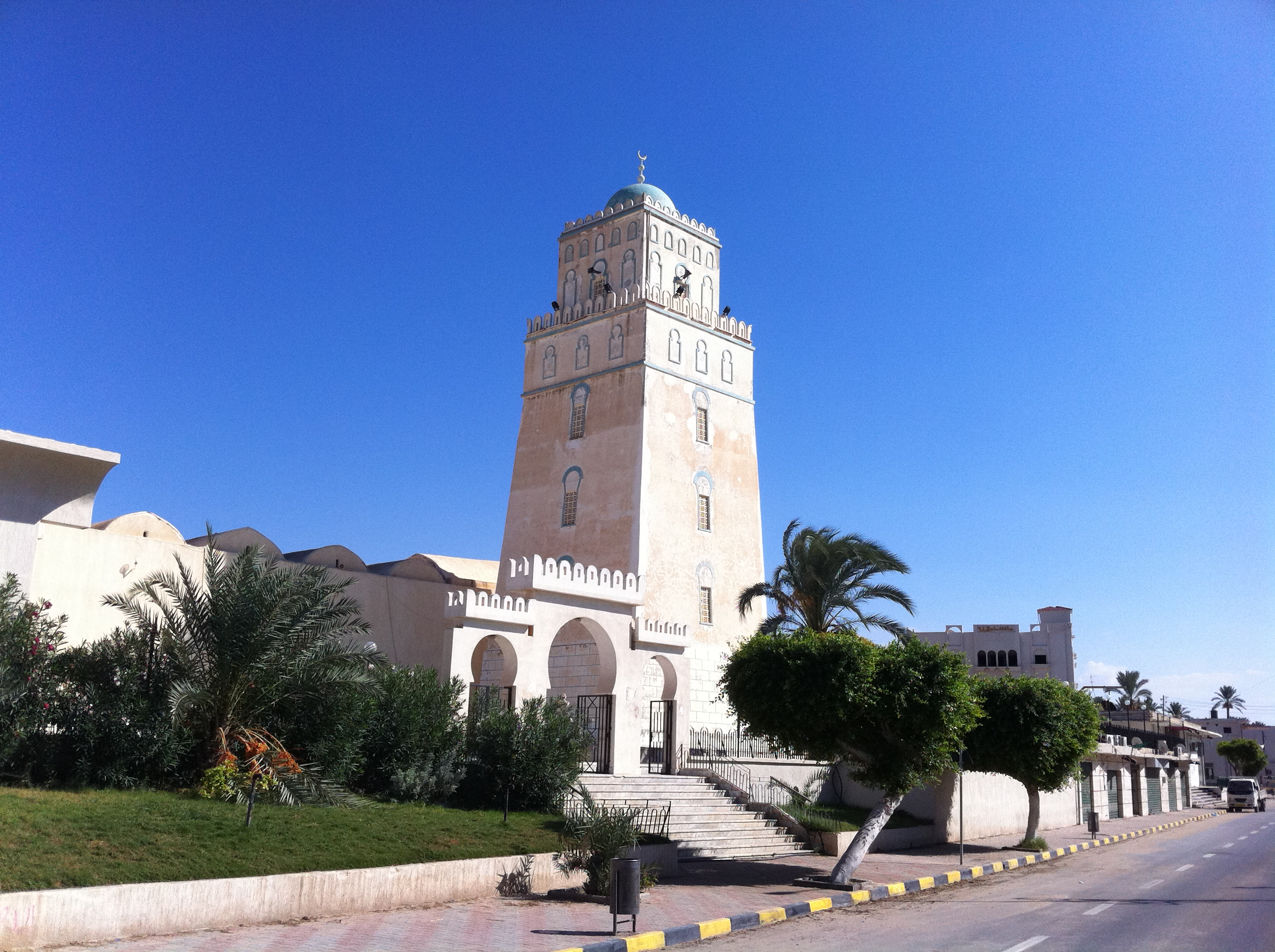
- Minaret of the Murad Agha Mosque as photographed in 2010

Religion
- Affiliation: Sunni Islam

Location
- Location: Tajura, Libya
- Interactive map of Murad Agha Mosque
- Coordinates: 32°52′54″N 13°20′25″E

Architecture
- Type: Mosque
- Founder: Murad Agha
- Established: 1550s

The Murad Agha Mosque (Arabic: جامع مراد آغا) is a mosque in Tajura, Libya. Its construction was commissioned by Murad Agha, the first Ottoman Beylerbey of Tripoli, in the 1550s. The mosque's minaret was built in the 20th century, in place of a previous one that collapsed in 1901.

== History ==
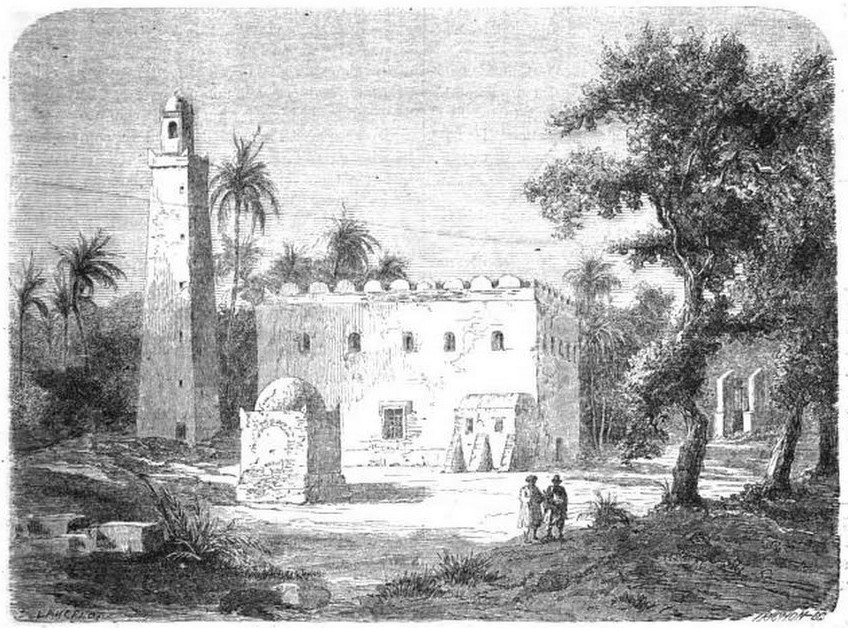
The mosque as it looked in 1861 with its original minaret

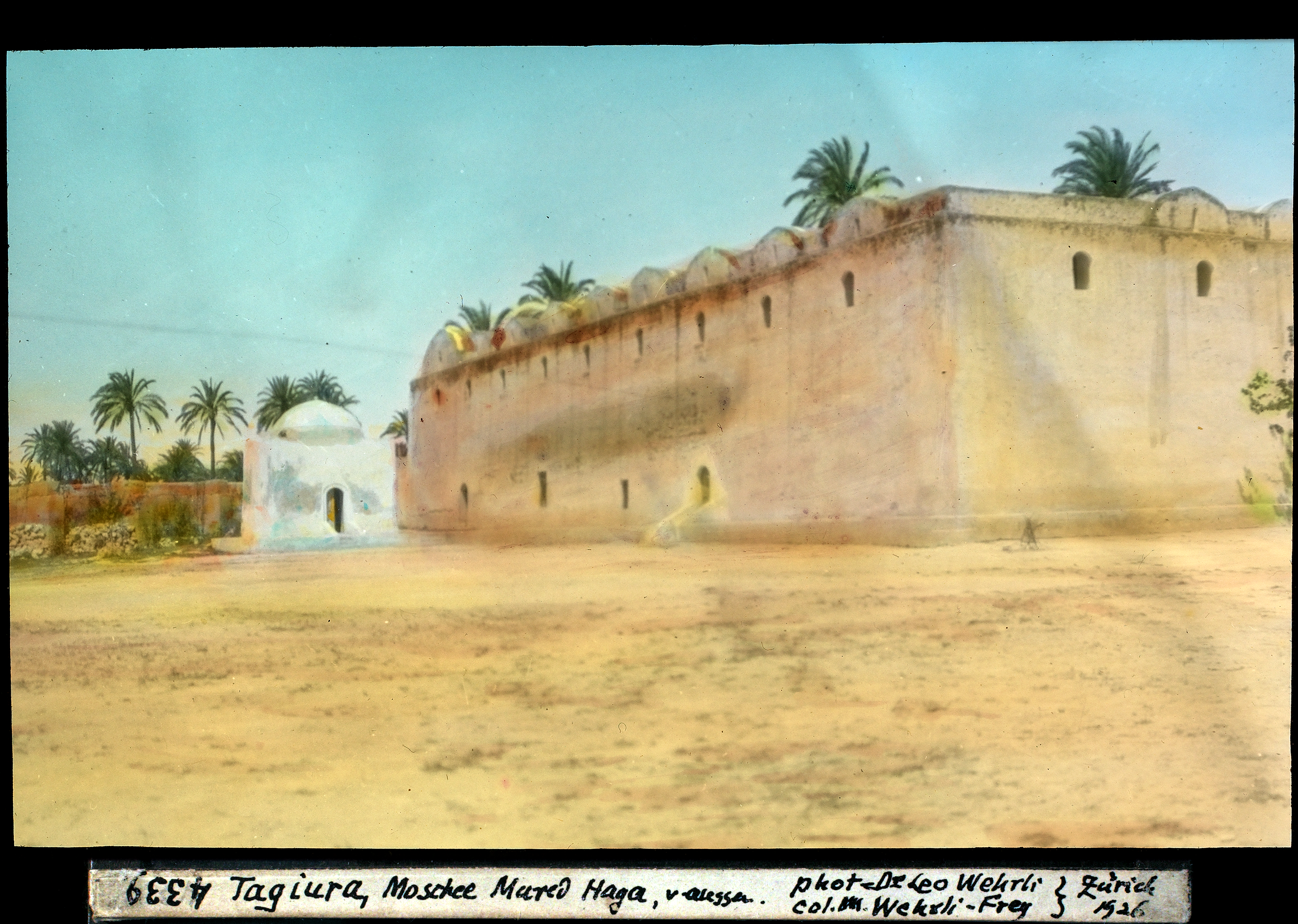
The prayer hall and Murad's tomb as photographed by Leo Wehrli, 1926. The minaret had not been rebuilt at this point.

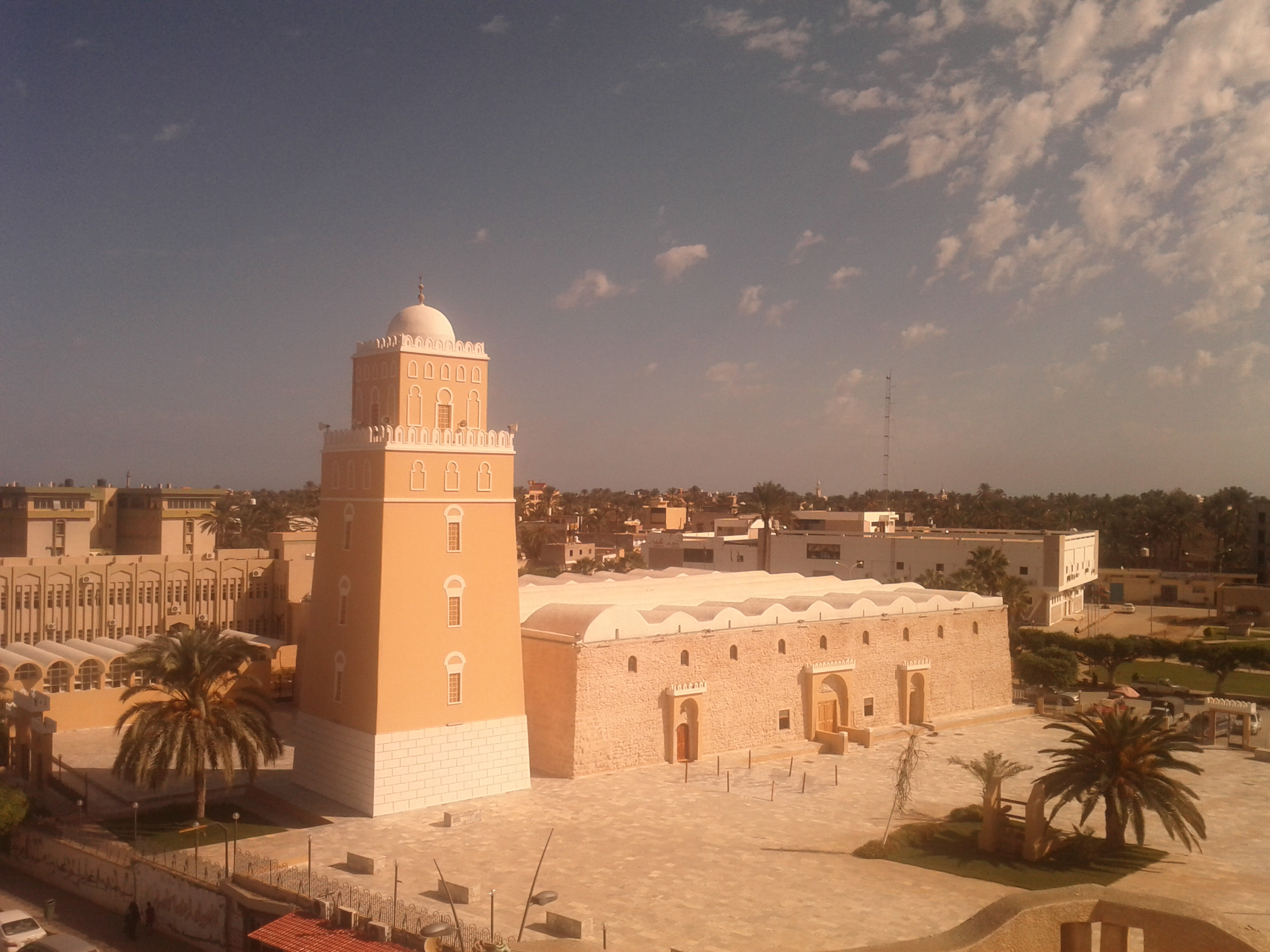
The minaret and prayer hall as photographed in 2014, after the destruction of Murad's tomb

The mosque is named after Murad Agha, an Ottoman ruler of Tajura who commissioned its construction. It was either built in 1552 while Murad was Beylerbey of Tripoli, or in around 1553–1556 when Murad returned to Tajura after being replaced as beylerbey by Dragut. Murad is said to have initially planned to build a fortress, but was compelled to build a mosque instead. Despite this, the mosque appears to have been designed to also function as a fortress against Spanish or Hospitaller incursions.

Maghrebi architects and engineers were likely involved in the mosque's construction, as it was built using local materials and building techniques rather than in an Ottoman style. Enslaved Christians are said to have been involved in its construction, and the possibility that one of the slaves might have been responsible for the building's design has also been suggested. Murad is said to have offered freedom to 300 Spanish or Sicilian slaves if they built the mosque in a short period of time. When Murad died in around 1556, he was buried in a tomb outside the mosque.

The mosque's minaret collapsed during an earthquake in 1901. In the 1920s, during the period of Italian colonial rule, some restoration works were carried out on the building and it was declared as a historic monument through a government decree dated 12 April 1922. The collapsed minaret had not yet been rebuilt at this stage, but a new minaret with a different design from the original was added at a later stage.

In 2011, before the start of the Libyan civil war, anti-Gaddafi protests were held outside the mosque. Murad's tomb was deliberately destroyed by an explosion in 2013; its destruction was condemned by Libyan Prime Minister Ali Zeidan and by UNESCO Director-General Irina Bokova.

== Architecture ==
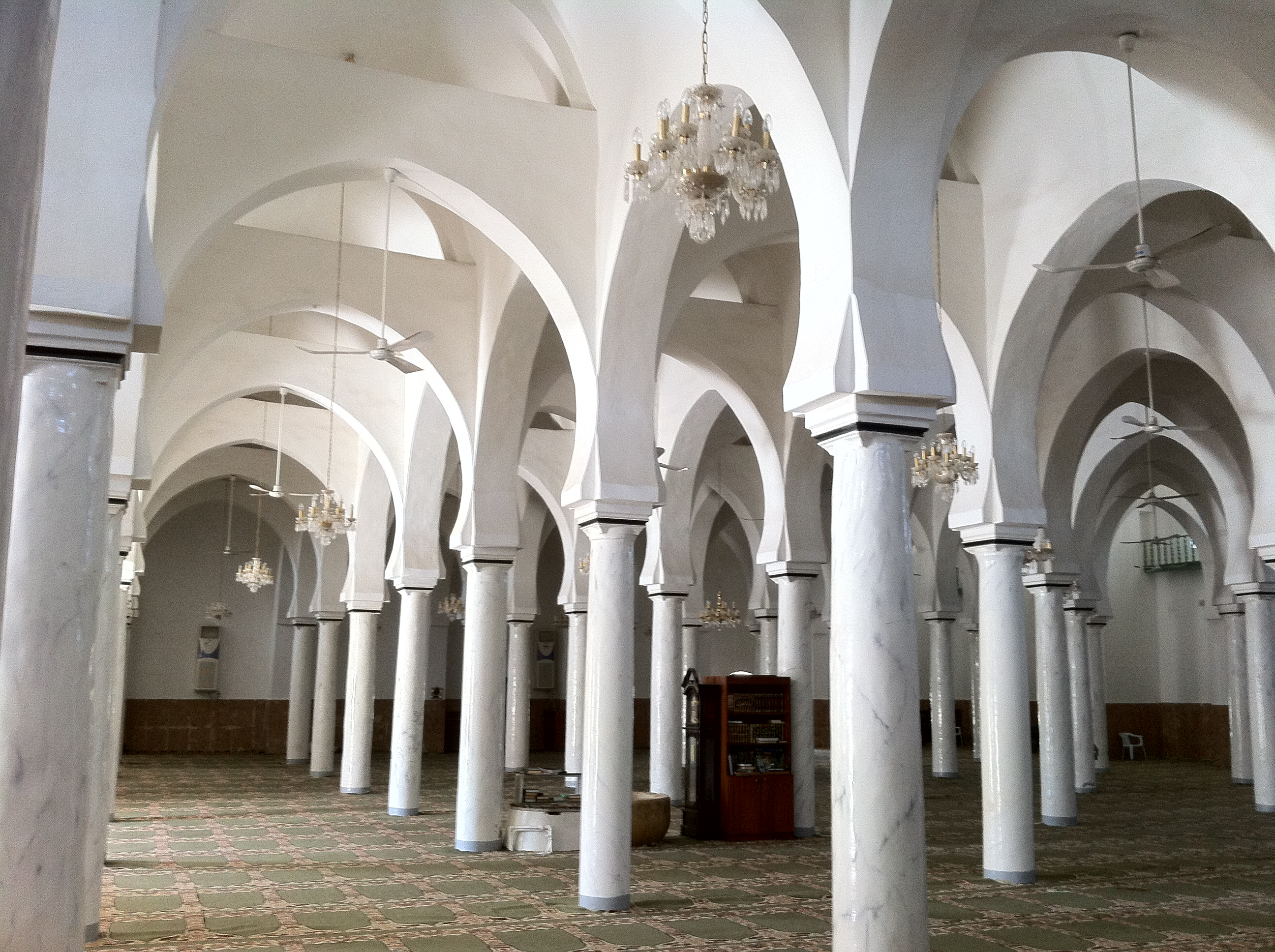
Interior of the prayer hall as photographed in 2010

The mosque's architecture combines Berber and ancient classical features. It has a rectangular plan of about 40 metres (130 ft) by 32 metres (105 ft) with plain but imposing exterior walls. Internally, its prayer hall features a series of barrel vaults supported by horseshoe arches, which are themselves supported by 48 columns of ancient Roman origin reused as spolia. The ends of the vaults feature apertures which appear to have been built as musketry loopholes.

According to tradition, the columns – which are composed of pink and red breccia, cipolin, black granite, and limestone – originated from Leptis Magna and were salvaged from a ship which had foundered near Tajura while they were being transported to Europe. It is also possible that the columns originated from ruined Roman villas in the vicinity of Tajura.

The mosque includes a courtyard with a minaret built in a traditional Maghrebi style. The minaret has a square plan, and its design bears similarities to the Great Mosque of Kairouan in Tunisia.
