= 101st Regiment of Foot =

101st Regiment of Foot may refer to:

- 101st Regiment of Foot (Royal Bengal Fusiliers), raised in 1652
- 101st Regiment of Foot (1760), or Johnstone's Highlanders, raised in 1760
- 101st Regiment of Foot (1780), raised in 1780
- 101st Regiment of Foot (1794), raised in 1794
- 101st Regiment of Foot (Duke of York's Irish), raised in 1805
