= 101 Squadron =

101 Squadron or 101st Squadron may refer to:

- No. 101 Squadron IAF, a unit of the Indian Air Force
- No. 101 Squadron RAF, a unit of the UK Royal Air Force
- 101 Squadron SAAF, a unit of the South African Air Force
- 101 Squadron (Israel), a unit of the Israeli Air Force
- 101 Squadron (Portugal), a unit of the Portuguese Air Force
- 101st Squadron (JASDF), a unit of the Japan Air Self-Defense Force
- 101st Aero Squadron, a unit of the Air Service, US Army
- 101st Bombardment (Photographic) Squadron, a unit of the US Army Air Forces
- 101st Observation Squadron, later 101st (Tactical) Reconnaissance Squadron, a unit of the US Army Air Forces
- 101st Fighter Squadron, a unit of the US Air Force
- 101st Intelligence Squadron, a unit of the US Air Force
- 101st Rescue Squadron, a unit of the US Air Force
- VF-101 (Fighter Squadron 101), a unit of the US Navy
- VMFAT-101 (Marine Fighter Attack Training Squadron 101), a unit of the US Marine Corps

== See also ==
- 101st Division (disambiguation)
- 101st Brigade (disambiguation)
- 101st Regiment (disambiguation)
- 101st Battalion (disambiguation)
