= Loll =

Loll may refer to:

- Renate Loll, physicist
- Sven Loll (born 1964), German judoka Olympic medalist
- Angle of loll, a specific hydrostatic stability condition experienced by unstable vessels at sea

== See also ==
- LOL
- Lol (disambiguation)
