= 101st Division (1st Formation) (People's Republic of China) =

101st Division (1949–50)
- Active: 1949.2 - 1950.1
- Country: People's Republic of China
- Branch: People's Liberation Army
- Type: Division
- Role: Infantry
- Part of: 34th Corps
- Engagements: Chinese Civil War

The 101st Division (Chinese: 第101师)(1st Formation), was created in February 1949 under the Regulation of the Redesignations of All Organizations and Units of the Army, issued by Central Military Commission on November 1, 1948, based on the Independent Brigade of Jianghuai Military District. Its history could be traced to the Huaibei Assault Detachment formed in January 1947.

The division was a part of PLA 34th Corps.

In January 1950 the division was inactivated. Headquarters, 102nd Division was converted as Fuzhou Branch Huazhong University of Military-Politics. All its three infantry regiments were transferred to 28th and 29th Corps to replace their regiments lost in the Battle of Guningtou.

As of its disbandment the division was composed of:

- 301st Regiment (later 251st Infantry Regiment, 84th Division);
- 302nd Regiment (later 244th Infantry Regiment, 82nd Division);
- 303rd Regiment (later 253rd Infantry Regiment, 85th Division).
