= 101st Infantry Division (German Empire) =

101st Infantry Division (101. Infanterie-Division)
- Active: 1915–18
- Country: German Empire
- Branch: Army
- Type: Infantry
- Size: Approx. 12,500
- Engagements: World War I: Gorlice–Tarnów Offensive; Serbian Campaign; Macedonian front

The 101st Infantry Division (101. Infanterie-Division) was a unit of the Imperial German Army in World War I. The division was formed on May 3, 1915, and organized over the next few weeks. It was part of a wave of new infantry divisions formed in the spring of 1915. The division was reduced to a division staff for special purposes (Divisions-Stab z.b.V.) without troops in July 1917 and dissolved in January 1918.

The division was formed primarily from the excess infantry regiments of existing divisions that were being triangularized. The division's 201st Infantry Brigade was formerly the 75th Infantry Brigade of the 37th Infantry Division, and came to the division with the 146th Infantry Regiment. The 45th Infantry Regiment came from the 2nd Infantry Division and the 59th Infantry Regiment came from the 41st Infantry Division.

== Combat chronicle ==
The 101st Infantry Division served on the Eastern Front, seeing its first action in the Gorlice-Tarnów Offensive. It crossed the Dnestr in June 1915, participated in the battles on the Galician and Russian Poland border, and advanced to the Bug by August. The division was then transferred south to participate in the Serbian Campaign. It reached Priština in late November and advanced to the Greek border in December. For most of 1916, and into 1917, the division remained on the Macedonian front. It underwent several changes, losing units to other divisions and receiving various replacements, and in July 1917, the division was dissolved as a tactical headquarters, with its subunits sent to other units. Its headquarters remained as a division staff for special purposes, administering Bulgarian units, until it was dissolved. Allied intelligence rated the division as third class.

== Order of battle ==
The 101st Infantry Division was formed as a triangular division. The order of battle of the division on May 15, 1915, was as follows:

- 201. Infanterie-Brigade
  - 8. Ostpreußisches Infanterie-Regiment Nr. 45
  - Infanterie-Regiment Freiherr Hiller von Gaertringen (4. Posensches) Nr. 59
  - 1. Masurisches Infanterie-Regiment Nr. 146
- 1.Eskadron/Dragoner-Regiment König Albert von Sachsen (Ostpreußisches) Nr. 10
- 2.Eskadron/Dragoner-Regiment von Wedel (Pommersches) Nr. 11
- Feldartillerie-Regiment Nr. 201
- Fußartillerie-Batterie Nr. 101
- Pionier-Kompanie Nr. 201
