= IOI =

IOI may refer to:

== Arts and entertainment ==
- Interonset interval, in music
- I.O.I, a South Korean girl group formed from the television show Produce 101
- Innovative Online Industries (IOI), a fictional corporation in the 2011 novel Ready Player One
  - Ready Player One (film), the 2018 film adaptation

== Organisations ==
- International Ombudsman Institute, global organisation
- IOI Group, a Malaysian conglomerate
- IO Interactive, a Danish video game developer

== Science and technology ==
- Idiopathic orbital inflammatory disease, involving any area of the orbit
- International Olympiad in Informatics, an annual competitive programming competition

== Other uses ==
- Indication of interest, in financial trading
- Interest on investment or return on investment
- Island of Ireland, the geographical entity encompassing both the Republic of Ireland and Northern Ireland

== See also ==
- LOL (disambiguation)
- 101 (disambiguation)
