= 101st Regiment of Foot (1780) =

- Active: 1780–1785
- Country: Kingdom of Great Britain (1707–1800)
- Branch: British Army
- Type: Infantry

Commanders
- Colonel of the Regiment: Maj-Gen. Robert Sandford

The 101st Regiment of Foot (1780–1785) was a short-lived infantry regiment in the British Army which was raised in Ireland in 1780 as an infantry corps for service in India.

En route to India by sea the regiment was involved in the indecisive naval battle of Porto Praya in the Cape Verde Islands, where they had anchored to take on water. After arriving in India in 1781 the regiment took part in the Second Mysore war against the Kingdom of Mysore, but was obliged to surrender to the forces of Tipu Sultan at the siege of Bednore and were interned until the Treaty of Mangalore in 1784.

Following its release the regiment sailed home to Ireland and were disbanded in 1785.

The Colonel-Commandant of the Regiment throughout its short life was Maj-Gen. Robert Sandford.
