= 101 =

101 often refers to:

- 101 (number), the natural number following 100 and preceding 102
- AD 101, a year in the 2nd century AD
- 101 BC, a year in the 2nd century BC

101 may also refer to:

== Entertainment ==
- 101 (album and film), a 1989 live album and documentary by Depeche Mode
- "101" (song), 1988, and single by Sheena Easton
- "101", a song on the Girl on Fire album by Alicia Keys
- The 101 Network, former name of Audience, an American pay television channel
- Radio 101 (Malta), a radio station in Malta
- NPO 101, the former name of defunct Dutch television channel NPO 3 Extra

== Transportation ==
- List of highways numbered 101, several roads, including:
  - U.S. Route 101, often called "The 101"
- 101 series, a commuter multiple unit train introduced in 1958 by Japan National Railways
- TMK 101, a tramcar type which was used in Zagreb, Croatia, from 1951 until December 2008
- McDonnell F-101 Voodoo fighter aircraft
  - McDonnell CF-101 Voodoo Canadian variant of the F-101
- Fisher FP-101 kit aircraft
- Zastava 101, a small family car based on the Fiat 128

== Other uses ==
- 101 (slang), a term used to indicate an introduction to a body of knowledge
- 101st Airborne Division
- Bell 101 modem, a late 1950s communications modem
- Bill 101 or Law 101, the Charter of the French Language in Québec
- Police 101, the single non-emergency number used by all UK territorial police authorities
- Romance 101, a South Korean manhwa series
- Taipei 101, the tallest skyscraper in the world from 2004 to 2010
- Mendelevium, chemical element with atomic number 101
- 101 Dalmatians (disambiguation)
- 101 Helena, a main-belt asteroid

== See also ==
- 101st (disambiguation)
- IOI (disambiguation)
- Room 101 (disambiguation)
