= 101st Guard Brigade of General Staff =

Ukrainian Armed Forces unit

101st Guard Brigade Of General Staff
- 101-ша бригада охорони Генерального Штабу
- Shoulder Sleeve Insignia
- Active: March 10, 1992 - Today
- Country: Ukraine
- Branch: General Staff of the Armed Forces
- Role: Infantry
- Garrison/HQ: Kyiv, Kyiv Oblast
- Patron: Henadii Vorobiov
- Engagements: Russo-Ukrainian War

Commanders
- Current commander: Col. Serhii Chernetskyi

Insignia
- Cap badge

- Coat of arms

The 101st Brigade for the Protection of the General Staff named after Colonel-General Henadii Vorobiov (Ukrainian: 101-ша окрема бригада охорони Генерального Штабу імені генерал-полковника Геннадія Воробйова) is a brigade of the Ukrainian Ground Forces formed in 1992. The brigade is stationed in Kyiv and tasked with the defense of Kyiv and its surroundings.

== History ==
In the last years of the Soviet Union, the 368th Battalion of Protection and Service guarded and supported the headquarters of the Kyiv Military District, which was stationed in the area of the Kyiv Military School. On March 10, 1992, the 101st Brigade of the General Staff Armed Forces of Ukraine was established based on that battalion. At the time, the brigade consisted of a guards battalion, a guard of honor, a command and control center battalion, a motor battalion, and support units. The 2nd Protection Battalion was formed on June 7, 1995, and the 3rd Protection Battalion on September 11 of the same year. The soldiers of the brigade took part in command and staff exercises such as "Forpost-2002", "East-West", "Reaction-2005", "Artery-2007", "Clean Sky", "The decisive action of 2008", "Interaction 2010", and "Adequate response 2011".

The brigade also fought in the war in Donbas. It entered the combat zone on August 3, 2014, and defended Debaltseve, seeing its first combat action on August 15. Colonel Mykola Shvets commanded the brigade at the time. The brigade escorted 300 convoys to the front and performed more than ten military intelligence extractions by February 2015. During its time in combat, eleven soldiers of the 101st Brigade were killed, and 49 were wounded. Eighteen soldiers of the brigade received either the Order of Bohdan Khmelnytsky or the Order For Courage.

On the occasion of the 30th Independence Day of Ukraine in August 2021, Ukrainian president Volodymyr Zelenskyy renamed the unit to honor the deceased First Deputy Chief of the General Staff of Ukraine, Henadii Vorobiov.

During the 2022 Russian invasion of Ukraine, the 101st Brigade fought in the Battle of Kyiv, apparently destroying a column of two light vehicles, two trucks, and a tank. It took part in defending the Kharkiv region during the 2024 Kharkiv offensive.

== Structure ==
As of 2024, the brigade's known structure is as follows:

- 101st Guard Brigade Of General Staff, Kyiv, Kyiv Oblast
  - Headquarters & Headquarters Company
  - 1st Guard Battalion
  - 2nd Guard Battalion
  - 3rd Guard Battalion
  - 4th Guard Battalion
  - Akademik Group Team
  - Battalion of Unmanned Systems “Talion”
  - Anti-Aircraft Defense Battalion
  - 412th Unmanned Systems Battalion “Nemesis”
  - Reconnaissance Company
  - Brigade Band
