= 101 Squadron SAAF =

Reserve squadron of the South African Air Force

101 Squadron
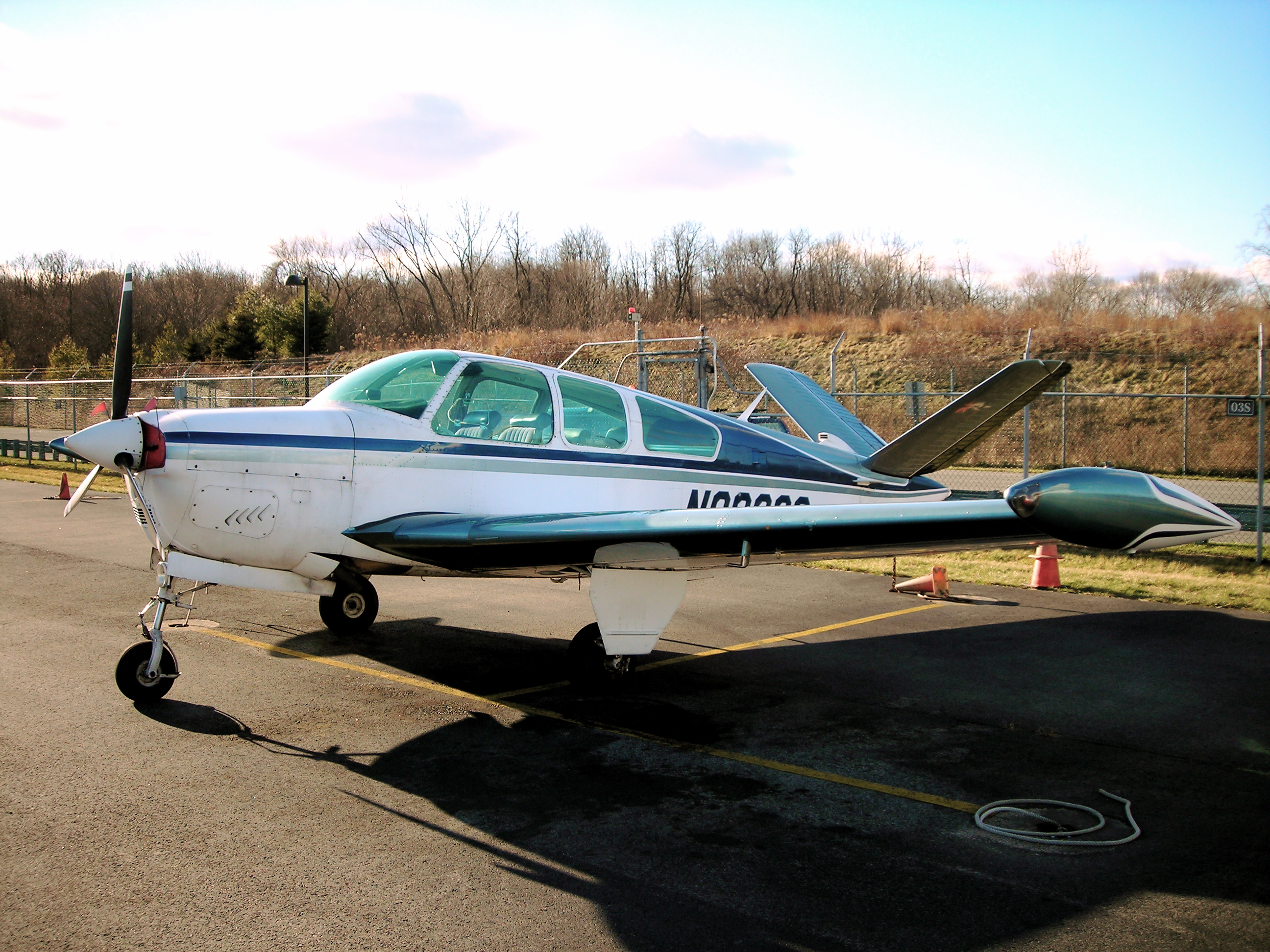
- The squadron uses privately owned civilian aircraft. Example of a Beechcraft Bonanza S35 similar to that found among the wide range of aircraft used.
- Country: South Africa
- Branch: South African Air Force
- Role: Citizen Force liaison and crime prevention squadron
- Garrison/HQ: AFB Hoedspruit

101 Squadron is a reserve squadron of the South African Air Force. Its main area of responsibility is Mpumalanga Province in the role of crime prevention. The squadron is based at AFB Hoedspruit. These reserve squadrons are used to fill a pilot and aircraft gap within the SAAF by making use of civilian pilots and their privately owned aircraft. Most flying takes place over weekends and because pilots have a good knowledge of the local terrain in the area where they live and commonly fly, the squadron is used mostly in the crime prevention role.
