= 101st Communications Regiment =

101st Separate Communication and Radio Technical Support Regiment
- 101-й окремий полк зв'язку та радіотехнічного забезпечення
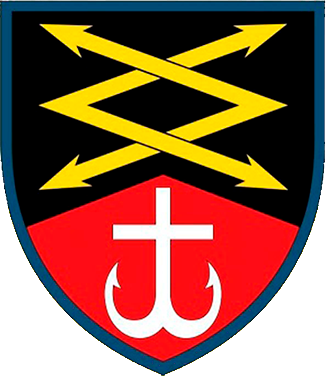
- Active: 1941 – present
- Country: Ukraine; Soviet Union (1941–1991)
- Allegiance: Armed Forces of Ukraine
- Branch: Ukrainian Air Force
- Type: Signal Corps
- Role: Communication
- Size: Regiment
- Part of: Air Force General Command
- Garrison/HQ: Vinnytsia, Vinnytsia Oblast
- Nickname: Vinnytsia Brigade
- Engagements: Russo-Ukrainian war: War in Donbass; Full scale invasion

Insignia
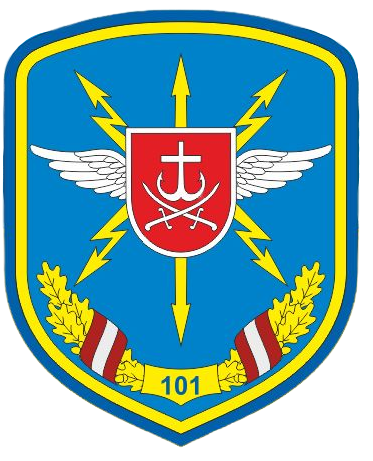
- Former insignia

The 101st Separate Communication and Radio Technical Support Regiment Vinnytsia (MUN A2656) is a regiment of the Ukrainian Air Force tasked with providing command and communication facilities to the units of the General Air Command. It is garrisoned in Vinnytsia.

== History ==
It was established on 27 June 1941, following the start of Operation Barbarossa as part of the Soviet Armed Forces. In 1943, the regiment was awarded the Order of the Red Star and the Soviet Battle banner in Melitopol which were later removed during decommunization efforts. Following the Dissolution of the Soviet Union, it came under the jurisdiction of Ukraine.

Since July 2014, the regiment has been providing communication support for Ukrainian forces during the War in Donbass. On 5 December 2016, it was awarded a new battle flag. On 13 December 2016, a soldier of the regiment (Remeshivsky Yevheny Oleksandrovych) was killed in action in Pokrovsk.

Following the Russian invasion of Ukraine, it provided communication support and also saw direct action. On 21 March 2022, three soldiers of the regiment (Stihailo Mykola Volodymyrovych, Jarmolka Maksym Ihorovych and Burdenyi Ihor Oleksandrovych) were killed in combat in Kramatorsk. On 4 August 2024, it received the honorary name "Vinnytsia". In February 2025, the regiment took first position in the annual Vinnytsia heavyweight lifting championship.

== Structure ==
- 101st Communications Regiment
  - Management and Headquarters
  - 1st Information and Telecommunications Battalion
    - Telecommunications Center
    - Automated Management Systems Center
    - Radio Broadcasting Center
    - Radio Reception Center
    - Classified Communications Center
  - 2nd Information and Telecommunications Battalion
    - Telecommunications Center
    - Automated Management Systems Center
    - Radio Broadcasting Center
    - Radio Reception Center
    - Classified Communications Center
  - Anti-aircraft Platoon
  - Commandant Platoon
  - Medical Center
