= 101st Infantry Division (France) =

- Active: 25 May 1914 – 26 November 1916; 16 March – May 1940
- Allegiance: France
- Type: Infantry
- Engagements: World War I World War II

The 101st Infantry Division was a Territorial division (French: 101e Division d'Infanterie Territoriale, 101e DIT) during World War I, and a Fortress division (French: 101e Division d'Infanterie de Forteresse, 101e DIF) during World War II.

== History ==
=== World War I ===
During World War I, the division comprised:

- 223rd Territorial Infantry Regiment.
- 259th Territorial Infantry Regiment.
- 268th Territorial Infantry Regiment.
- 279th Territorial Infantry Regiment.

The division was formed on 25 May 1914, and was dissolved on 26 November 1916. During this time, it was part of the French 3rd, 8th, 31st and 33rd Corps (Corps d'Armée (CA)), which in turn were part of the French 1st and 2nd Armies.

=== World War II ===
During the Battle of France in May 1940 the division was made up of the following units:

- 84th Fortress Infantry Regiment.
- 87th Fortress Infantry Regiment.
- 161st Artillery Regiment.

It was a Series B reserve division containing older reservists. It was a Fortress Division meant to defend the French border with Belgium.

At the start of the German offensive on 10 May 1940, the 101st was assigned to the 5th Army Corps (motorized), 1st Army, 1st Army Group. The division held a section of the Maginot Line near Clairfayts. The 7th Panzer Division broke through the sector of the 84th Regiment in a night assault on 16 May after "considerable resistance".
