= 101 Battalion (Libya) =

101 Battalion, also known as 101 Brigade or Tajura Battalion, was a military insurgent unit in the eastern suburbs of Tripoli, aligned with Khalifa Haftar and the Libyan National Army. It was particularly associated with the suburbs of Tajura and Fashloum.

== Origin and name ==
101 Battalion, based in Tajura, took its name from the Libyan National Army's 101 Light Infantry Battalion.

== Leadership ==
In 2013, 101 Battalion was led by Misbah al-Harna. It was later led by Abdullah Sassi until his capture and apparent execution in April 2015.

== Battles ==
On 16 November 2013, 101 Battalion was attacked at its Tajura base by Misratan forces. A Tajura military council member and a Tripoli local council member claimed that the 101 Battalion had abandoned the base, and that the Tajura military council had organised forces that had forced the Misratan attackers to leave.

On 17 April 2017, the 101 Battalion attacked Libya Dawn forces in Tajura. The Libya Dawn forces detained and killed Abdulla Sassi, according to Afrigate News. Abd al-Basit Sharr was accused of having executed Sassi and was himself executed on 31 December 2015 in Tajura.
