= 101st United States Colored Infantry Regiment =

- Active: from September 16, 1864 to August 5, 1865 - January 21, 1866
- Country: United States
- Allegiance: Union
- Branch: Union Army; United States Colored Troops
- Type: Infantry
- Engagements: Affair at Scottsboro, Alabama; Affair at Stevenson's Gap, Alabama

The 101st U.S. Colored Infantry Regiment was an infantry regiment that was a part of the USCT during the American Civil War. The regiment primarily conducted duty in the state of Tennessee before being mustered out.

== Organization ==
On October 10, 1864, Colonel R.D Mussey Jr, Commissioner for Organization of Colored Troops, in a report to Nashville, stated that in February 1864, Adjutant General Lorenzo Thomas authorized the formation of a "laboring regiment" to be composed of men only fit for garrison duty.

The regiment was organized at large in the state of Tennessee from September 16, 1864, to August 5, 1865. On September 25, 1864, Brigadier General John F. Miller, listed the 101st, as organizing, initially with 300 men, as one of the regiments not attached to the garrison troops.

== Service ==
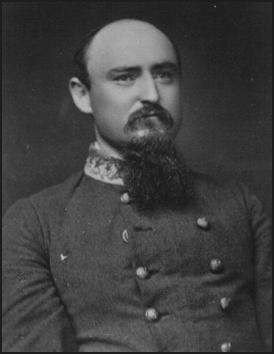
Picture of Brigadier General Hylan B. Lyon

On October 10, 1864, Captain Ben S. Nicklin of the 13th Indiana Battery, sent Lieutenant Gable, along with 15 men from the 101st, to the South Tunnel, to guard against guerilla attacks. On the same day, Colonel Mussey reported that the regiment now had 600 men, and had already conducted fatigue duty, and had also furnished the guards for the contraband camps at Nashville and Clarksville. He said that "I have endeavored to select as officers for the 101st, from whom chiefly came the superintendents for the contraband camps, men who have had previous experience in their old regiments as quartermaster or commissary sergeants, as possessing a better knowledge of business than other applicants.”

On January 8, 1865, Company E under Lieutenant John E. Hull, who was commanding a detachment of the regiment, guarding the water tanks at Scottsboro, Alabama, were under attack by Confederate forces under Brigadier General H.B Lyon, despite holding the depot for some time, they were forced to retreat under artillery fire to Larkinsville, Alabama, losing 6 men wounded in the process.

On March 19, 1865, a Confederate attack on a garrison at Stevenson's Gap, Alabama resulted in 9 men of the regiment being captured. On July 1, 1865, an order was issued that relived the 101st from further duty at Clarksville, and the regiment was mustered out of service on January 21, 1866.

== Notable commanders ==
- Colonel Robert W. Barnard

== See also ==
- List of United States Colored Troops units in the American Civil War
