= Tajura =

Tajura تاجوراء
- Town
- Location within Libya
- Coordinates: 32°52′54.59″N 13°20′23.76″E
- Country: Libya
- Muhafazah: Greater Tripoli
- Baladiyah: Tajura

Government
  - Governing body: Tajura Municipal Council
- Elevation: 6 m (20 ft)

Population (2019)
  - Total: 325,836
- Time zone: UTC+1 (CET)
  - Summer (DST): UTC+2 (CEST)

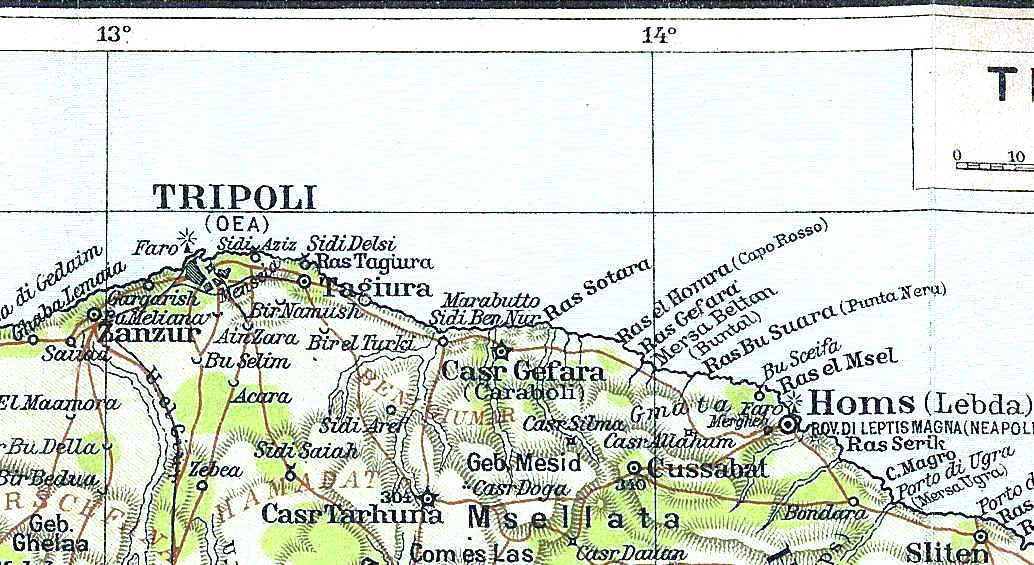
1913 map with Tajura (spelled Tagiura), on the Mediterranean in the Tripolitania region.

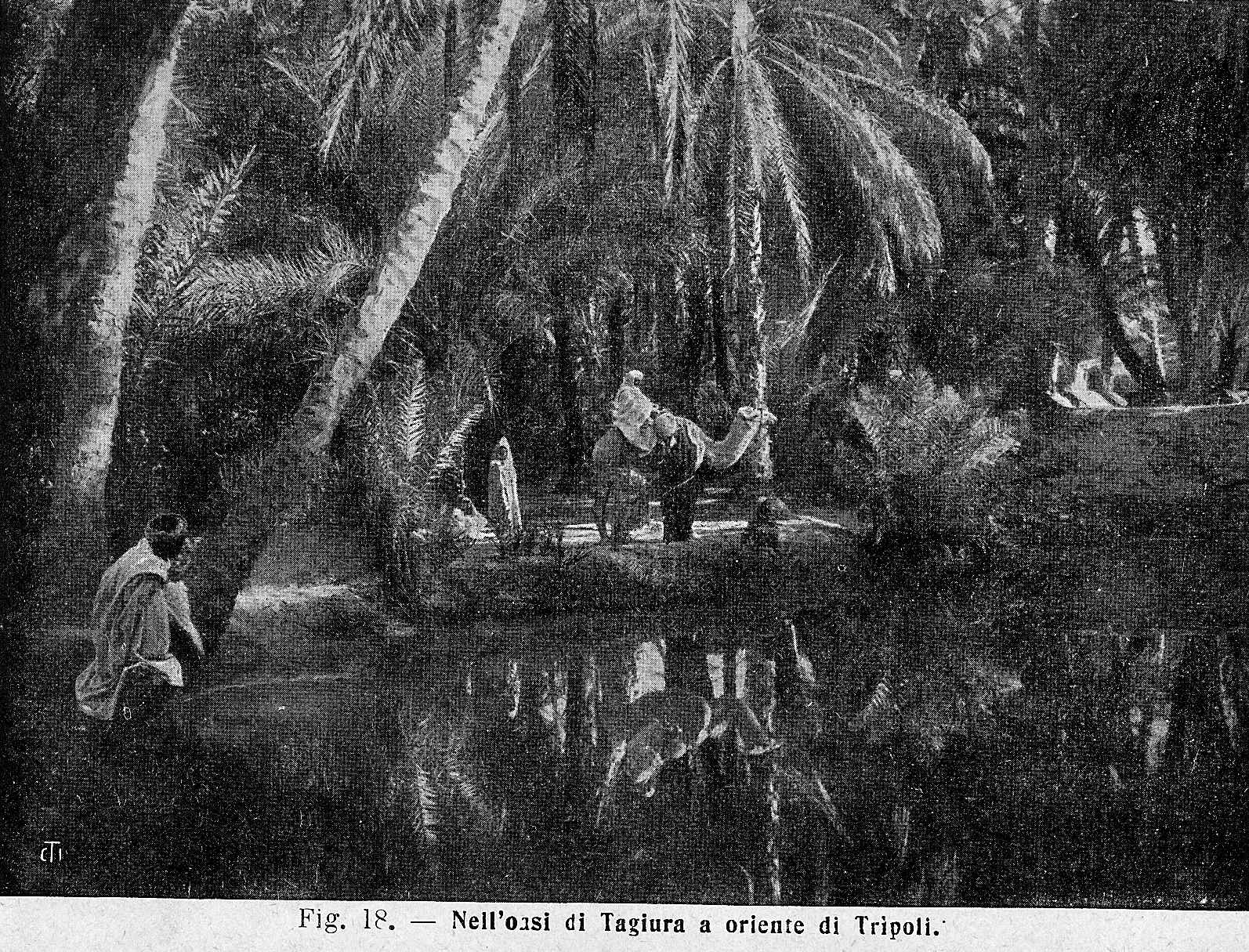
Tajura Oasis in 1913.

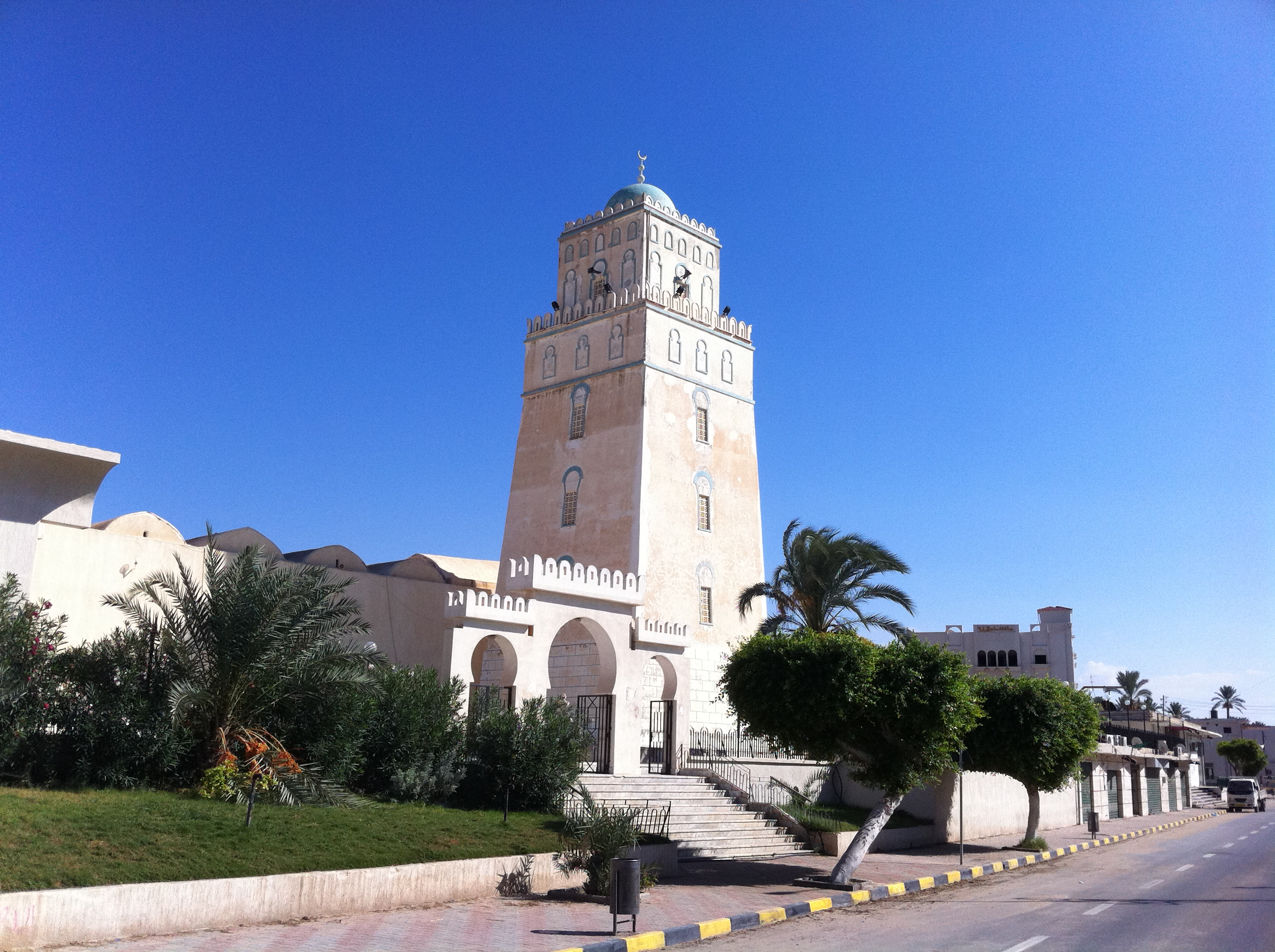
Murad Agha Mosque in Tajura

Tajura (Arabic: تاجوراء, romanized: Tājūrā), also spelt Tajoura, is a town in north-western Libya, and baladiyah in the Tripoli Muhafazah, on the Mediterranean coast 23 kilometres (14 mi) east of Tripoli.

From 2001 to 2007 Tajura was the capital of the Tajura wa Arba' District. Tajura is also known to be the most anti-Gaddafi district in Tripoli and had high casualties in the Libyan revolution.

== History ==
The Ottoman Turks established a base at Tajura in 1531. Under the command of Hayreddin Barbarossa, the site was selected for its proximity to Tripoli which had come under the Knights of Malta in 1530 when Charles V of Spain, as King of Sicily, had given them Tripoli, Gozo and Malta. Tripoli was captured in the Siege of Tripoli.

Tajura was the center of Libya's nuclear research, with a 10 MWt pool type research reactor (IRT-1) built by the Soviet Union, which came online in 1981. A fire broke out in an outbuilding in April 2024, which the Libyan Atomic Energy Commission reported as under control.

During the Libyan crisis, Tajura has become associated with the insurgency of 101 Battalion.

The name Tajoura is rumoured to be named after a princess who lost her crown. "Taj" meaning crown, and "oura" being the name of the princess, the crown was found in this area and so was named Tajoura (Oura's crown).

== Districts of Tajura ==
- Goot Al-Rumman
- Abe Al Ash'her
- Al-Marouhna
- Al Hamidiya
- Al Kwateb
- Al'aswal
- Awlad Al Turki
- Be'ar Al Sanyaa
- Shatt al-Sidi Othman (Sidi Othman)
- Btisp
- Be'ar Al Osta Milad
- El Atamana
- Dakhla
- Rima
- Diyar Jaber
- Almchai - Aribat - and the cemetery Sahaabi and Hada title Almchai
- Market - the middle
- Goudec
- Punishment (the headquarters of the commander Uqba)
- Al Knadra
- Andilsi
- Shatt span
- al mashin
- Wadi Al Rabie

== Notable residents ==
- Isa Stoppi (1941–2020), Italian model
