= 1580s =

Decade

The 1580s decade ran from January 1, 1580, to December 31, 1589.

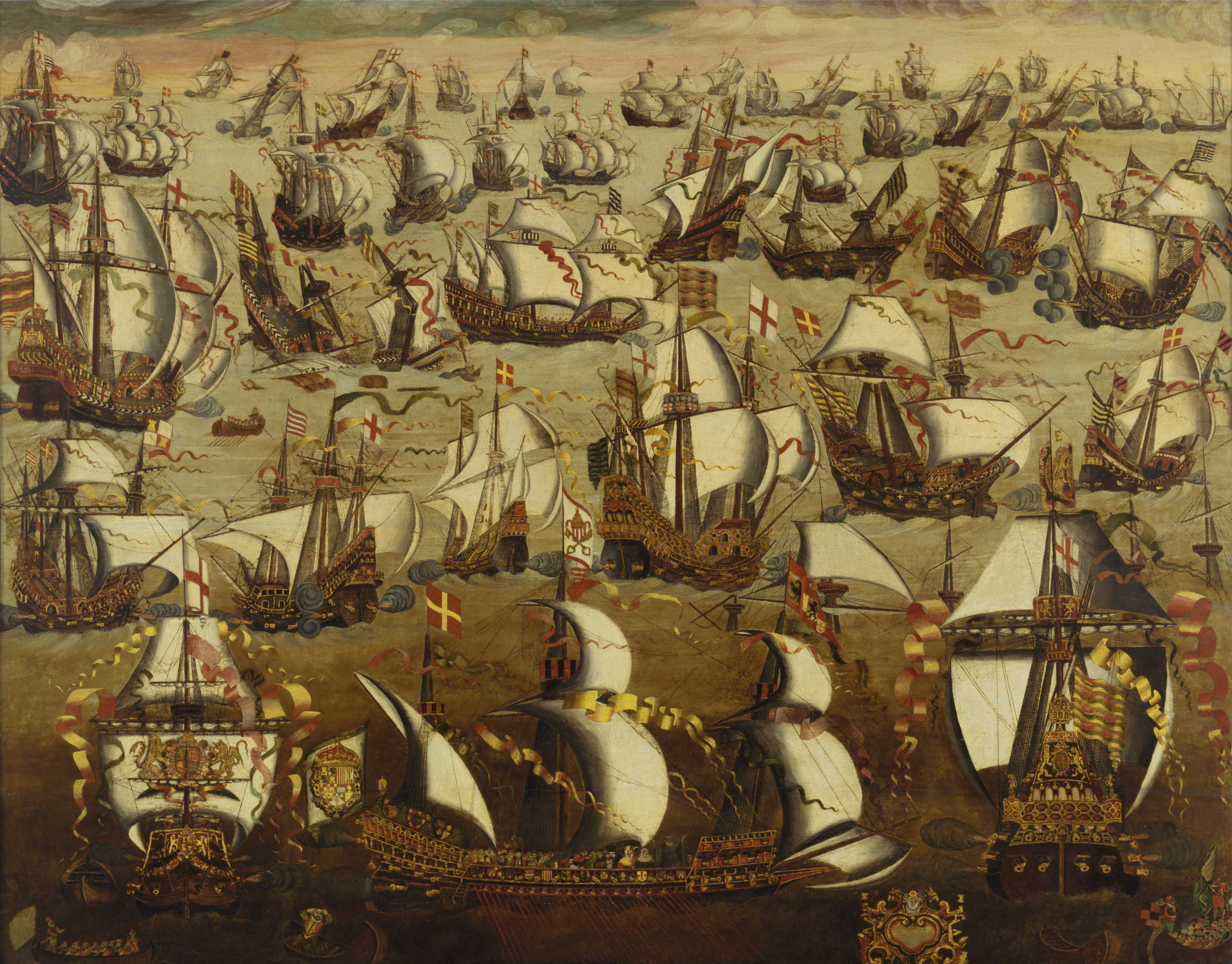
English Ships and the Spanish Armada, August 1588

== Events ==
=== 1580 ===
==== January–March ====
- January 31 – Portuguese succession crisis of 1580: The death of Henry, King of Portugal, with no direct heirs, leads to conflict between his potential successors, including King Philip II of Spain and Infanta Catherine, Duchess of Braganza.
- February 16 – The massacre of 20 artists at the Mardi Gras festivities at the annual Carnaval de Romans during the festival takes place in France at Romans-sur-Isère.
- February 28 – Three Jesuit priests from Portuguese Goa, including Rodolfo Acquaviva, arrive in Agra on the mainland of India as guests of the Mughal Emperor, Akbar the Great, who is curious about Christianity. The Emperor grants land to the Jesuit fathers for the building of the first Roman Catholic Church in the Mughal Empire.
- March 1 – Michel de Montaigne signs the preface to his most significant work, Essays. They are published later this year.
- March 3 – George de Lalaing, Count of Rennenberg defects from the Union of Utrecht and the Dutch Republic, and turns over the province of Groningen to King Philip II of Spain.
- March 25 – Iberian Union: King Philip II of Spain becomes King of Portugal under the name Philip I, following the death without heirs of King Henry of Portugal, in a personal union of the crowns, thus maintaining Portuguese independence (in Europe and throughout the Portuguese Empire). The Philippine Dynasty rule lasts until 1640.

==== April–June ====
- April 6 – The Dover Straits earthquake occurs.
- April 9 – English Fury at Mechelen: English and Scottish mercenaries, assisting the Dutch Republic, storm the Spanish Netherlands city of Mechelen (in modern-day Belgium), killing 60 civilians and plundering the town's houses and churches.
- May 29 – Stephen Báthory is formally crowned as Grand Duke of Lithuania at the Vilnius Cathedral.
- May – The Lipizzan stud is established by Charles II, Archduke of Austria.
- June 5 – In the Kingdom of Golconda (part of the modern-day Indian state of Telangana), 15-year-old Muhammad Quli Qutb Shah is proclaimed as the new Sultan upon the death of his father, Ibrahim Quli Qutb Shah Wali.
- June 9 – Rebels of the Dutch Union of Utrecht, aided by French soldiers, make a surprise attack on the Spanish Netherlands city of Diest in the Duchy of Brabant, and overwhelm the strategic location, now in Belgium, in one day.
- June 11 – Within the Viceroyalty of Peru in South America Spanish explorer Juan de Garay founds the first permanent Spanish settlement at what is now the capital of Argentina, on the Rio de la Plata. Garay, who came on an expedition down the Paraná River from Asunción (now in Paraguay), arrives at the site of the failed Spanish settlement of Ciudad de Nuestra Señora Santa María del Buen Ayre, that had been created by Pedro de Mendoza in 1536 and abandoned in 1542. Garay names the new settlement "Santísima Trinidad" but the city eventually takes the name of the port, which he calls "Puerto de Santa María de los Buenos Aires."
- June 21 (8 Cemazi ul-evvel 988 AH) – England signs a commercial treaty with the Ottoman Empire, and Sultan Murad III sends a letter to Queen Elizabeth I informing her, "Just as the merchants of Poland and France and Venice come and go, the merchants of your domain also shall bring wares to our Well-Protected Domains and take away wares." In return, Murad III is able to purchase English metals (iron, brass and tin) for his war with Persia.
- June 25 – The Book of Concord, a collection of Lutheran confessional documents, is published.

==== July–September ====
- July 12 – The Ostrog Bible, the first complete printed Bible translation into a Slavic language (Old Church Slavonic), is first printed at Ostroh in the Polish–Lithuanian Commonwealth (modern-day Ukraine) by Ivan Fyodorov.
- July 24 – Portuguese succession crisis of 1580: António, Prior of Crato, a grandson of the late King Manuel by Manuel's second son, the Duke of Beja is proclaimed King of Portugal by his supporters in the city of Santarém, and popular acclamation follows in Lisbon and other locations. Portugal's parliament, the Cortes, refuses to acknowledge Antonio and he is defeated 32 days later at Alcântara.
- August 25 – Battle of Alcântara: Spanish armies, led by Fernando Álvarez de Toledo, defending the claim of King Philip II of Spain to the Portuguese throne, defeat the armies of Portuguese claimant António, Prior of Crato.
- September 26 – Francis Drake returns to Plymouth, England from his voyage of circumnavigation (westbound) on the Golden Hind, the second completed in a continuous voyage, and the first under its original commander.
- September 29 – Five of the seven provinces of the Dutch Republic (with the exception of Zeeland and Holland) sign the Treaty of Plessis-les-Tours, recognizing Francis, Duke of Anjou as the Republic's sovereign.

==== October–December ====
- October 4 – Lorenzo Suárez de Mendoza, the Spanish Count of Coruña, arrives in Mexico City to take office as the Viceroy of New Spain, administering Mexico and Central America on behalf of King Philip II.
- October 15 (5th waning of Tazaungmon 942 ME) – King Bayinnaung of Bruma dispatches a naval force of 200 ships and 8,000 soldiers to invade the Kingdom of Mrauk U (now in the Rakhine State of Myanmar), but the attempt fails after a year. Burmese troops are ordered withdrawn after Bayinnaung dies and is succeeded by his son Nanda Bayin.
- October 18 – The Siege of Steenwijk in the Dutch Republic is started by the Spanish Netherlands. The siege will last four months and the Spanish troops will capture Steenwijk on February 23.
- October 24 – The War of the Portuguese Succession comes to an end as Spanish forces crush the final Portuguese resistance in the last stronghold in mainland Portugal, Porto. For the next 60 years, Portugal will be ruled by the Kings of Spain.
- November 10 – Second Desmond Rebellion: The Siege of Smerwick (now Ard na Caithne in County Kerry, Ireland) ends after three days when their commander surrenders to the English. Members of a group of at least 400 freelance soldiers, and perhaps as many as 700, for the Papal States are summarily executed on orders of the English Lord Deputy of Ireland, Baron Grey de Wilton.
- December 31 – James Douglas, 4th Earl of Morton, formerly the regent for King James VI of Scotland, is arrested during a meeting of Scotland's Privy Council at Holyrood on the accusation of James Stewart, Earl of Arran that the Earl of Morton had participated in the 1567 murder of Lord Darnley, husband of Mary, Queen of Scots and father of King James. Morton is taken to Dumbarton Castle and convicted of conspiracy to murder, and executed on June 2.

==== Date unknown ====
- The Billy Mitchell volcano, on the island of Bougainville, undergoes a catastrophic eruption (VEI 6).
- The first session of the Jewish Vaad (Council of Four Lands) is held in Lublin, Poland; 70 delegates of Jewish local qahals meet to discuss taxation, and other issues important to Jewish communities.
- The Old City of Zamość is established in Poland, by Jan Zamoyski.
- The 1580 influenza pandemic sweeps the world, starting in Asia and moving rapidly through Africa, Europe, and eventually the Americas. More than 10% of the population of Rome dies, and whole towns in Spain are depopulated.

=== 1581 ===
==== January–March ====
- January 11 – Chandrasen Rathore, ruler of the Kingdom of Marwar (now part of the state of Rajasthan in India) dies at the age of 39, leaving a power vacuum that allows the Mughal Empire to take control of the kingdom.
- January 14 – The Treaty of Drohiczyn is concluded, ending the Livonian War and adding the conquered city of Riga to the Polish-Lithuanian Commonwealth.
- January 23 – The Treaty of Plessis-les-Tours between the Duchy of Anjou and most of the states of the Dutch Republic is ratified at Bourdeaux, granting François, Duke of Anjou executive authority over the Republic with the title "Protector of the Liberty of the Netherlands".
- February 8 – (7th waxing of Tabaung 942 ME) Prince Shin Thissa, later to become King of Burma in 1599 as Nyaungyan Min, receives his first executive job when he is appointed to be Governor of Nyaungyan by his father, King Bayinnaung.
- February 23 – The Spanish Army is forced to abandon the siege of Steenwijk in the Netherlands after more than four months.
- March 18 – The Parliament of England's Act against Reconciliation to Rome imposes heavy fines, for practising Roman Catholicism.
- March 25 – Iberian Union: Philip II of Spain is crowned Philip I of Portugal.

==== April–June ====
- April 4 – Following his circumnavigation of the world, Francis Drake is knighted by Elizabeth I of England.
- May 15 – Zsigmond Báthory, the 8-year-old son of Kristóf Báthory, ruler of the Principality of Transylvania, is elected by the Diet of Transylvania as the new voivode at the request of Kristóf, who dies 12 days later.
- May 26 – (10th waning of Nayon 943 ME) In Burma, Thiri Thudhamma Yaza of Martaban becomes the new Viceroy of Martaban (now Mottama in the Mon State of Myanmar) after the demise of Minye Nandameit.
- June 2 – James Douglas, 4th Earl of Morton, the last regent for Scotland from 1572 to 1578 during the minority of King James VI, is beheaded at Edinburgh using the "Scottish Maiden", after being convicted of conspiracy in the 1567 murder of Henry Stuart, Lord Darnley, consort of Mary, Queen of Scots and father of King James."
- June 14 – The representatives of the States General of the Netherlands vote to declare that the throne of the Union of Utrecht is vacant because of the erratic behavior of King Philip II.

==== July–September ====
- July 11 – The Knights Hospitaller depose Jean de la Cassière as Grandmaster and appoint Mathurin Romegas in his place.
- July 14 – English Jesuit Edmund Campion is arrested.
- July 22 At a meeting of the States General of the Union of Utrecht at Antwerp, the representatives vote to proclaim their independence from Spain in the Act of Abjuration, abjuring loyalty to Philip II of Spain as their sovereign, and appointing Francois, Duke of Anjou, as the new sovereign of the Netherlands; public practice of Roman Catholicism is forbidden.
- July 26
  - The Act of Abjuration is signed at The Hague by representatives of eight Dutch provinces as a declaration of independence from Spanish rule and a secession from the Union of Utrecht. The signing confirms a decision made in a July 22 meeting of the States General in Antwerp. King Philip II of Spain refuses to acknowledge the Abjuration.
  - A meteorite strikes the Earth in Thuringia in the Holy Roman Empire.
- July 27 – Capture of Breda: After a surprise attack the day before, Spanish troops under the command of Claude de Berlaymont, Lord of Haultepenne, take the walled city Breda in the Netherlands. Once inside the gates, the Spanish troops overcome the defenders and carry out the massacre of 584 citizens in the "Haultepenne Fury".
- August 28 – The army of King Stephen Báthory of Poland begins its siege of the Russian garrison of Pskov.
- September 6 – A mercenary army of Sweden, under Pontus De la Gardie, captures Narva from Russia.
- September 23 – Martín Enríquez de Almanza arrives in Lima and becomes the new Viceroy of Peru, replacing Francisco de Toledo, who was summoned home by King Philip II.
- September 30 – In Japan, warlord Oda Nobunaga invades the Iga Province. With 42,000 troops under his command against 10,000 defenders led by Takino Jurobei, Nobunaga controls most of central Japan within eight days.

==== October–December ====
- October 8 – The Tenshō Iga War ends in Japan with the surrender of Kashiwara Castle to Oda Nobunaga.
- October 10 – King Bayinnaung of Burma, who created the largest empire in mainland southeast Asia, dies at age 65.
- October 15 – Ballet Comique de la Reine, the first narrative ballet, devised by Louise of Lorraine, wife of Henry III of France, and choreographed by Balthasar de Beaujoyeulx, opens in its first performance at the court of Catherine de' Medici, in the Louvre Palace in Paris, as part of the wedding celebrations for Marguerite of Lorraine.
- November 4 – Jean de la Cassière is restored as Grandmaster of the Knights Hospitaller, by Pope Gregory XIII.
- December 1 – In England, Jesuit priest Edmund Campion is executed for treason.

==== Date unknown ====
- The Ming Dynasty Chancellor of China, Chief Grand Secretary Zhang Juzheng, imposes the Single Whip Reform, by which taxes are assessed on properties recorded in the land census, and paid in silver, as the accepted medium of exchange.
- The Trier witch trials begin.
- John Dee practices angel magic with Barnabas Saul, but with no success.
- Guru Arjan Dev becomes the fifth Guru of Sikhs, succeeding his father Guru Ram Das.
- The last Bishop of Meissen, John IX of Haugwitz, resigns his office in the wake of the Reformation.

=== 1582 ===
==== January–March ====
- January 2 – University of Würzburg is refounded.
- January 15 – Russia cedes its conquered areas in Livonia (Northern Latvia and Southern Estonia), to the Polish–Lithuanian Commonwealth.
- February 10 – François, Duke of Anjou, arrives in the Netherlands, where he is personally welcomed by William the Silent.
- February 24 (Julian) (March 6 Gregorian) – Pope Gregory XIII proclaims the Gregorian Calendar, to come into effect in October. Under the order, the date on the Julian calendar will be advanced by 10 days in order to synchronize the calendar date back to the equinoxes and solstices, since the gap has been increasing by one day every 100 years since the 6th century and is 10 days off schedule.
- March 9 – Scryer Edward Kelley arrives at John Dee's house in London. They practice angelic magic together and Dee develops the Enochian language.
- March – The New Testament of the Douai Bible, the translation into English by Father Gregory Martin from Latin of the New Testament, for use in the Roman Catholic Church, is published. Martin had started his work on October 16, 1578.

==== April–June ====
- April 2 – 1582 Ancuancu earthquake: Ancuancu (in modern-day La Paz Department, Bolivia) is struck by an earthquake that reportedly buries all of the inhabitants, except for one chief, who reportedly loses the ability to speak. On the place where the village had stood, the Jacha Kalla (Achocalla) valley is formed as a result of the earthquake.
- April 3 – Battle of Temmokuzan: Unable to reverse the collapse of Takeda clan, Takeda Katsuyori and his household commit suicide.
- April 14 – King James VI of Scotland signs a charter creating the Tounis College, which becomes the University of Edinburgh.
- April 16 – Spanish conquistador Hernando de Lerma founds the settlement of Salta, Argentina.
- April 17 – Siege of Takamatsu: In Japan, Toyotomi Hideyoshi departs from the Himeji Castle in the modern-day Hyōgo Prefecture and begins his march westward with 20,000 soldiers to the Bitchū Province in the modern-day Okayama Prefecture. Along the way, he stops at the Kameyama Castle where he makes a rendezvous with the Ukita clan and 10,000 additional forces before proceeding toward the Takamatsu Castle.
- May 17 – The Siege of Takamatsu begins as Hideyoshi attacks the forces of Shimizu Muneharu, who has twice as many soldiers. Hideyhoshi orders an engineering project to block the Ashimori River and divert its waters to flood Takamatsu Castle.
- June 8 – Siege of Takamatsu: Heavy rains and the dikes built by Hideyoshi's forces turn the area around Takamatsu Castle into a lake.
- June 21 – (2nd day of the sixth month, Tenshō 10) The Honnō-ji Incident occurs in Kyoto in Japan, as Japanese warlord Oda Nobunaga, on the verge of unifying Japan under his rule, is assassinated following a betrayal by a rebel subject, Akechi Mitsuhide.
- June 23 – After learning of the assassination of his commander, Oda Nobunaga, Shimizu Muneharu surrenders Takamatsu Castle to Toyotomi Hideyoshi and, in return for the pledge that the castle's defenders will be spared, commits the ritual suicide of seppuku.

==== July–September ====
- July 2 – Battle of Yamazaki: Counterattacking forces led by Toyotomi Hideyoshi decisively defeat Akechi Mitsuhide's smaller army; Akechi is killed while retreating to his domain.
- July 26 – Battle of Ponta Delgada (War of the Portuguese Succession): Spanish admiral Santa Cruz decisively defeats a larger mercenary fleet from France, England, supporters of the Portuguese claimant António, Prior of Crato, and the Dutch Republic, under Filippo di Piero Strozzi (who is killed) off the Azores, the first engagement between large fleets of galleons, operating at any great distance from the mainland.

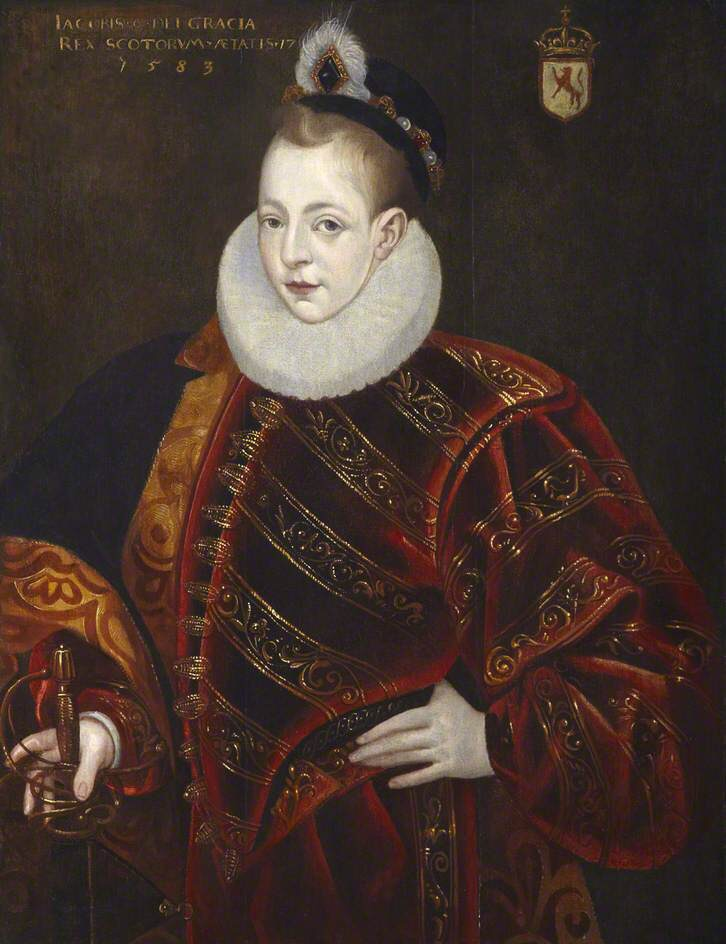
Young King James, taken hostage

- August 23 – Raid of Ruthven in Scotland: Presbyterian nobles led by William Ruthven, 1st Earl of Gowrie kidnap King James VI of Scotland, the kingdom's 16-year-old ruler, while he is hunting in Perthshire. The Earl of Gowrie imprisons the King at Ruthven Castle as part of a coup d'etat to reform the Scottish government.
- September 28 – Ruthven and his co-conspirators arrange for John Maxwell, 8th Lord Maxwell, heir to former regent James Douglas, 4th Earl of Morton, to be installed as Scotland's regent. Douglas had been executed in 1581 for the 1567 murder of Henry Stuart, Lord Darnley, husband of Mary, Queen of Scots, and father of King James VI, who is imprisoned at Ruthven's castle.

==== October–December ====
- October 4 (Julian) (October 14 Gregorian) – The Julian calendar is discarded at the end of the day in Italy, Poland, Portugal, and Spain as Pope Gregory XIII implements the Gregorian calendar. In the nations where the calendar is accepted, Thursday, October 4 is followed the next day by Friday, October 15.
- October 26 (Julian) (November 5 Gregorian) – General Yermak Timofeyevich completes the Russian conquest of Siberia in the Battle of Chuvash Cape as Kuchum Khan abandons Qashliq, the capital of the Khanate of Sibir. The Qashliq fortress will be torn down and a new town, Tobolsk will be built 11 miles (18 km) further up the Irtysh river.
- November 29 – Ten years before he begins writing his first known plays, William Shakespeare, 18 years old, marries pregnant 26-year-old Anne Hathaway in England.
- December 9 (Julian) (December 19 Gregorian) – France discards the Julian Calendar at the end of the day and adopts the Gregorian Calendar at midnight. Sunday, December 9 is followed the next day in France by Monday, December 20.

==== Date unknown ====
- The temple complex of Kumbum is founded in Tibet.
- In Ming dynasty China:
  - Jesuit Matteo Ricci is allowed to enter the country.
  - The earliest reference is made to the publishing of private newspapers in Beijing.
- The sultanate of Morocco begins to press southward, in search of a greater share of the trans-Saharan trade.
- The Cagayan battles in the Philippines, the only recorded clashes between European regular soldiers and samurai warriors.

=== 1583 ===
==== January–March ====
- January 1 – The Duchy of Savoy adopts the Gregorian Calendar, replacing the Julian Calendar.
- January 18 – François, Duke of Anjou, attacks Antwerp.
- February 4 – Gebhard Truchsess von Waldburg, newly converted to Calvinism, formally marries Agnes von Mansfeld-Eisleben, a former canoness of Gerresheim, while retaining his position as Archbishop-Elector of Cologne.
- February 7 – In the Netherlands, the Siege of Eindhoven by the Spanish Army begins. The walled city will fall in April.
- March 10 (February 28 O.S.) – The Queen Elizabeth's Men troupe of actors is founded in England by order of Queen Elizabeth to Edmund Tilney, the royal Master of the Revels.

==== April–June ====
- April 9 – A Burmese Army force of 16,000 men, commanded by Thado Dhamma Yaza II of Prome and Nawrahta Minsaw of Lan Na to suppress the rebellious of the Shan States in the modern-day Yunnan province of China, is welcomed by King Nanda Bayin at the royal capital, Pegu, after a successful punitive expedition. The commanders bring with them the rebel chief from the Sanda state.
- April 19 – Queen Elizabeth dissolves the English Parliament which had been convened in 1572 but last met in 1581.
- April 23
  - The Kingdom of England establishes its first diplomatic relations with the Ottoman Empire.
  - After a siege of 75 days, Dutch Republic commander Hendrik van Bonnivet surrenders Eindhoven to the Spanish Netherlands.
- April 25 – In a clash between a 50,000-man Persian Empire force and the Ottoman Empire for control of the Caucasus region in modern-day Russia, the Ottomans are routed.
- May 11 – In modern-day Russia, on the Caspian Sea, the three-day "Battle of Torches" ends as Ottoman Empire troops defeat forces of the Persian Empire.
- May 21 – Battle of Shizugatake in Japan: Shibata Katsuie is defeated by Toyotomi Hideyoshi, who goes on to commence construction of Osaka Castle.
- May 22 – Ernest of Bavaria is elected as Roman Catholic Archbishop of Cologne, in opposition to Gebhard Truchsess von Waldburg. The opposition rapidly turns into armed struggle, the Cologne War within the Electorate of Cologne, beginning with the Destruction of the Oberstift.
- May 28 – The first installment of the translation by Jurij Dalmatin of the Bible into the Slovene language, Bibilija, tu je vse svetu pismu stariga inu noviga testamenta (The Bible, featuring the complete Old and New Testaments), is published in Wittenberg.
- June 17 – Spanish troops under the command of Alexander Farnese, Duke of Parma overwhelm a combined army of Dutch, French and English soldiers at the Battle of Steenbergen in the modern-day Netherlands. The multinational force sustains 3,200 people killed or wounded.
- June 18 – In England, the first known life insurance policy is issued. The Royal Exchange of London accepts a premium from William Gibbons, agreeing to pay a group of 30 beneficiaries a total of £383, 6s. 8d if he dies on or before June 17, 1584. Gibbons dies on May 29, 1584, and the Royal Exchange refuses to pay until a court rejects the insurer's argument that a month is actually four weeks or 28 days.
- June 27 – Ten months after being taken hostage on August 23, 1582 in the Raid of Ruthven, the 17-year-old King James VI of Scotland is able to escape Falkland Prison and flees to safety in St. Andrews.

==== July–September ====
- July 25 – Cuncolim Revolt: The first documented battle of India's independence against a European colonial ruler is fought by the Desais of Cuncolim in Goa, against the Portuguese.
- August 5 – Sir Humphrey Gilbert, on the site of the modern-day city of St. John's, claims the island of Newfoundland on behalf of England, marking the beginning of the British Empire.
- August 19 – Petru Cercel enters Bucharest, and becomes Prince of Wallachia.
- August 29 – English ship Delight, with Humphrey Gilbert's expedition, becomes the first of over 350 ships over time to run aground and be wrecked on Sable Island in the North Atlantic.
- September 4 – King James VI of Scotland orders a gift to Colonel William Stewart in recognition of Stewart's rescue of the King from prison. Colonel Stewart is presented with some of the jewels of Mary, Queen of Scots (the King's mother).
- September 9 – English ship Squirrel, the flagship of explorer, Sir Humphrey Gilbert, sinks in a storm with all hands along with all but one of Gilbert's colonial expedition. Gilbert and his men had been returning from North America after claiming Newfoundland in the name of Queen Elizabeth.

==== October–December ====
- October 14 – In Scotland, the University of Edinburgh holds its first classes, accepting more than 80 students as "Tounis College". In continuous operation for more than 440 years, the University will have more than 41,000 students.
- October 16 – King Philip II of Spain orders the transfer of Abada the rhinoceros from the Casa de Campo public park of Madrid, to the menagerie at his residence at El Escorial.
- October 17 – Peter the Lame becomes Prince of Moldavia (in modern-day Romania) for the third and last time, reigning until 1591.
- October 18 – In South America, the Third Council of Lima comes to an end after two months after being convened to provide a consistent doctrine for the Roman Catholic Church in the Viceroyalty of Peru. Among other things, the Council approves the treatment of the native population "not like slaves but as free men" as part of evangelism and conversion to Christianity, as well as the use of the Quechua language and the Aymara language to spread the gospel. The use of Spanish is ordered for church services, and Latin is forbidden.
- October 24 – Jan van Hembyze becomes the last leader of the Calvinist Republic of Ghent after a coup d'etat against the ruling Count of Flanders. Hembyze's action leads days later to the siege of Ghent by Spanish General Alexander Farnese.
- November 4
  - Francis Throckmorton, instigator of the Throckmorton Plot to overthrow Queen Elizabeth I of England, is arrested. Convicted of treason, he is executed on July 10, 1584.
  - Gerolamo Chiavari is elected to a 2-year term as the new Doge of the Republic of Genoa to succeed Gerolamo De Franchi Toso.
- November 5 – Willem IV van den Bergh, the Stadtholder of Guelders for the Dutch Republic is arrested along with his family and charged with treason on suspicion of having allowed the Spanish Army to seize Zutphen. Imprisoned for five months, he is released in March after promising to retire from public service.
- November 13 – In India, the city of Allahabad (modern-day Prayagraj in the state of Uttar Pradesh) is founded as a strategic fortress by Akbar, Emperor of the Mughal Empire.Surendra Nath Sinha (1974).
- November 24 – Philippe Hurault de Cheverny is appointed as the new Chief Minister of France by King Henri III upon the death of René de Birague, who had governed for nine years. Hurault will serve until 1589.
- December 17 – Cologne War: The Siege of Godesberg (begun on November 18) concludes when Catholic forces under Prince-elector-archbishop Ernest of Bavaria capture the strategic position, from defenders of the Calvinist convert Gebhard Truchsess von Waldburg.

==== Date unknown ====
- The world's oldest, intact, surviving amusement park, Dyrehavsbakken, is founded north of Copenhagen.
- The current building housing the Bunch Of Grapes pub is built on Narrow Street in Limehouse, London. Referred to by Charles Dickens in Our Mutual Friend as "The Six Jolly Fellowship Porters", it still stands in the 21st century, much rebuilt and renamed 'The Grapes'.
- The Ottoman fleet crosses into the Western Mediterranean and raids the Italian coastline. In Corsica, the towns of Sartene and Arbellara are sacked (summer).

=== 1584 ===
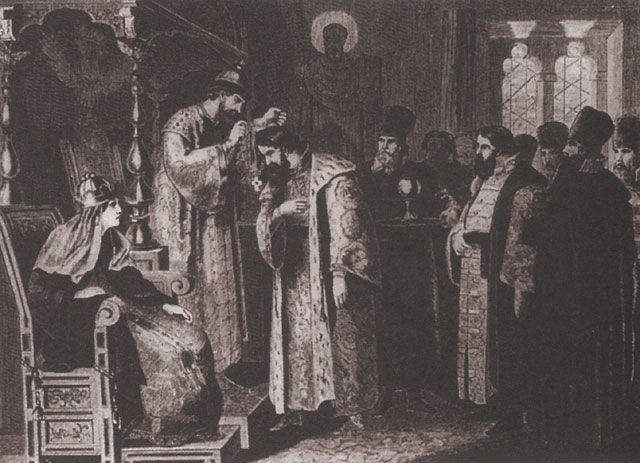
March 18: Feodor I becomes the new Tsar of Russia.

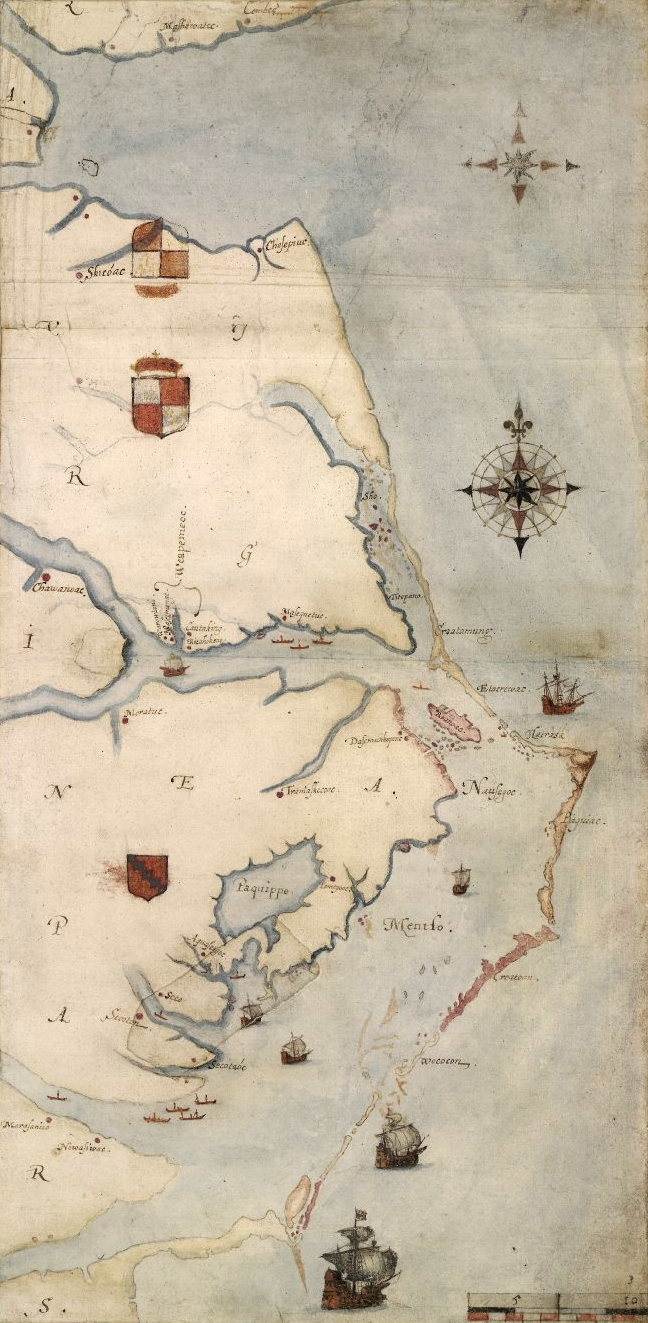
June 4: Roanoke Island is discovered by English settlers.

==== January–March ====
- January 11 – Sir Walter Mildmay is given a royal licence to found Emmanuel College, Cambridge in England.
- January 16 – Roman Catholic priest George Haydock, imprisoned in the Tower of London since 1582, states during an interrogation that he claimed that Queen Elizabeth, leader of the Church of England, was a heretic. Convicted of treason, he is executed on February 12.
- February 2 – (6th waning moon of the Magha, BE 2126) In what is now Thailand, Prince Naresuan, the Uparaja of the Ayutthaya Kingdom and the son of King Mahathammarachathirat carries out the orders of Burma's King Nanda Bayin, and leads an army to suppress a rebellion by the Viceroy of the Ava Kingdom, Thado Minsaw. Arriving in April, Naresuan learns that King Nanda has ordered Naresuan to be assassinated, and begins his own rebellion against Burma, the Burmese–Siamese War.
- February 22 – After being falsely accused of various charges, Jeremias II Tranos, leader of the Eastern Orthodox Church as Ecumenical Patriarch of Constantinople, is deposed by his fellow bishops and exiled to the island of Rhodes. Jeremias is replaced by Pachomius II Patestos.
- March 5 – The city of Karlstad, Sweden gaines city status by Duke Charles.
- March 28 (O.S. March 18) – Ivan the Terrible, ruler of Russia since 1533, dies; he is succeeded as Tsar by his son, Feodor.

==== April–June ====
- April 24 – (1st waning of Kason 946 ME) In what is now Myanmar, Prince Naresuan of the Ayutthaya Kingdom (now Thailand) suppresses the rebellion of Thado Minsaw of the Ava Kingdom.
- April 28 – (Tenshō 12, 18th day of the 3rd month) In Japan, the Battle of Komaki begins as fight between Toyotomi Hideyoshi and Tokugawa Ieyasu when Ieyasu, commander of 100,000 men, begins the occupation of the Komakiyama Castle, prompting Hideyoshi to advance from Osaka with 30,000 troops.
- May 17 – (Tenshō 12, 8th day of the 4th month) The conflict between Toyotomi Hideyoshi and Tokugawa Ieyasu culminates in the Battle of Nagakute.
- June 1 – With the death of the Duc d'Anjou, the Huguenot Henry of Navarre becomes heir-presumptive to the throne of France.
- June 4 – Walter Raleigh sends Philip Amadas and Arthur Barlowe to explore the Outer Banks of Virginia (modern-day North Carolina), with a view to establishing an English colony; they locate Roanoke Island.
- June 11 – Walk (modern-day Valka and Valga, towns in Latvia and Estonia respectively), receives city rights from Polish king Stefan Bathory.

==== July–September ====
- July 3 – The Siege of Antwerp by the Spanish Army begins and lasts for 13 months until Antwerp's surrender on August 17, 1585.
- July 5 – The Maronite College is established in Rome.
- July 10 – Willem van Oranje, the leader of the Dutch Republic as Stadtholder of Holland, is assassinated in Delft. Balthasar Gérard, who bought two wheel-lock pistols and then made an appointment with at the Prinsenhof, shoots William in the chest at close range and fatally wounds him, making William the first head of state to be assassinated with a handgun.
- August 6 – Russian conquest of Siberia: Russian General Yermak Timofeyevich, who had been dispatched by Ivan the Terrible in 1582 to conquer the Khanate of Sibir, is killed along with all but one member of his invading force in an ambush commanded by Kuchum Khan, the ruler of Siberia.
- August 7 – In Lima in the Viceroyalty of Peru, Italian printer Antonio Ricardo receives official permission to set up the first printing press in South America, and prints the first publication there, Pragmatica, a four-page outline of how the new Gregorian calendar (adopted 1582) works.
- August 11 – (Tenshō 12, 16th day of the 7th month) The Tenshō embassy, Japan's first diplomatic mission to Europe, arrives in Portugal with four teenagers— Julião Nakaura, Mancio Itō, Martinho Hara and Miguel Chijiwa— who had become converts to Christianity.
- September 17 – In what is now Belgium, the Calvinist Republic of Ghent comes to an end after seven years when its capital, Ghent, falls following a siege of 13 months. Jan van Hembyze, leader of the republic since October 1583, surrenders the city to Alexander Farnese, Governor of the Spanish Netherlands.

==== October–December ====
- October 26 – At the Battle of Slunj in the Kingdom of Croatia, an Ottoman invasion led by Ferhad Pasha Sokolović is turned back by Croatian forces, aided by troops of the Habsburg monarchy.
- November 23 – In the wake of the Throckmorton plot to overthrow her government, Queen Elizabeth convenes a new session of the English House of Commons since 1581. John Puckering is appointed by her as the Speaker of the House of Commons, which has 460 members. The parliament passes the Safety of the Queen Act and the Jesuits Act 1584,
- November 24 – Albert Fontenay sends an enciphered letter to Mary, Queen of Scots that will become the chief evidence against her in her trial for treason during the Babington Plot. After becoming a witness for the English government in return for immunity from prosecution, Jérôme Pasquier will decipher the letter in 1586, leading to Mary's conviction for an attempt to assassinate Queen Elizabeth and to overthrow the English government.
- December 31 – The Treaty of Joinville is signed secretly between the French Catholic League and Spain.

==== Date unknown ====
- Ratu Hijau becomes queen regnant of the Malay Patani Kingdom.
- Belgian cartographer and geographer Abraham Ortelius features Ming dynasty-era Chinese carriages with masts and sails, in his atlas Theatrum Orbis Terrarum; concurrent and later Western writers also take note of this peculiar Chinese invention.
- This year, according to Italian heretic Jacopo Brocardo, is regarded as an apocalyptic inauguration of a major new cycle.

=== 1585 ===
==== January–March ====
- January 21 – Robert Nutter, Thomas Worthington, and 18 other Roman Catholic priests are "perpetually banished" from England by order of Queen Elizabeth, placed on the ship Mary Martin of Colchester, and transported to France.
- February 16 – Pachomius II is deposed by fellow bishops from his position as Ecumenical Patriarch of Constantinople, head of the Eastern Orthodox Church, and replaced by the Metropolitan of Philippoupolis, Theoleptus II.
- February 21 – King Johan III of Sweden, widowed since 1583, marries Gunilla Bielke in a ceremony at Västerås, which the King's siblings refuse to attend. The coronation of Queen consort Gunilla takes place the next day. Over the next seven years, she works on changing the Catholic government's attitude towards Protestants.
- March 10 – The Spanish Army, commanded by Alexander Farnese, Duke of Parma, obtains the surrender of Brussels after a siege that began the year before.

==== April–June ====
- April 10 – Pope Gregory XIII, known for promulgating the Gregorian calendar within the Roman Catholic nations of the world in 1582, dies after a reign of almost 13 years. A papal conclave is convened 11 days later to elect a successor.
- April 21 – The papal conclave begins at the Vatican in Rome on Easter Sunday, with only 42 of the 60 cardinals attending. Early voting favors Cardinals Pier Donato Cesi and Guglielmo Sirleto, neither of whom receives a majority.
- April 24 – Cardinal Felice Piergentile of the church of San Girolamo dei Croati is unanimously elected as the 227th Pope, and takes the regnal name Pope Sixtus V.
- May 1 – The coronation of Pope Sixtus V takes place in Rome.
- May 19 – Spain seizes English ships in Spanish ports, precipitating the Anglo-Spanish War (1585–1604).
- June 11 – The 9.2 magnitude Aleutian Islands earthquake unleashes a tsunami in the Pacific Ocean, killing many people in Hawaii and reportedly striking Japan.
- June – Toyotomi Hideyoshi begins the invasion of the Japanese island of Shikoku with an army of 113,000 men on 703 ships. The troops are divided into three groups, with 60,000 commanded by Hashiba Hidenaga and Hashiba Hidetsugu toward the provinces of Awa and Tosa; 23,000 under Ukita Hideie at the province of Sanuki; and 30,000 under Kobayakawa Takakage and Kikkawa Motoharu for the province of Iyo.

==== July–September ====
- July 7 – The Treaty of Nemours forces King Henry III of France to capitulate to the demands of the Catholic League, triggering the Eighth War of Religion (also known as the War of the Three Henrys) in France.
- July 12 – Invasion of Shikoku: The final battle of the invasion, the siege of Ichinomiya Castle, begins.
- July 29 – Aboard the English ship Tiger, Roanoke expedition leader Ralph Lane negotiates an agreement with the Secotan people, who are represented by Granganimeo, the brother of the Secotan leader, King Wingino. Although the Secotans grant Lane's request to allow the English to live on Roanoke Island, he is told that they will receive no assistance from the natives, because of problems the previous year with Walter Raleigh.
- August 6 – (11th day of the 7th month of Tenshō 13) Invasion of Shikoku: In Japan, Chōsokabe Motochika surrenders the island of Shikoku to Toyotomi Hideyoshi, after a 26 day siege of the Ichinomiya Castle by 40,000 men.
- August 8 – English explorer John Davis enters Cumberland Sound in Baffin Island, in his quest for the Northwest Passage.
- August 14 – Queen Elizabeth I of England agrees to establish a protectorate over the Netherlands.
- August 17
  - Antwerp, now in Belgium, is captured by Spanish forces commanded by the Duke of Parma. The Duke orders all Protestants to leave the city. As a result, over half of the 100,000 inhabitants flee to the northern provinces. Furthermore, upon hearing of the capture of Antwerp, a relief fleet sent to raise the siege instead blockades the Scheldt River, preventing any and all ships from reaching Antwerp for two centuries. This effectively destroys Antwerp's position as an important trade city and de facto capital of the Dutch provinces. Its position is taken over by various northern cities, most prominently Amsterdam.
  - The Roanoke colonists complete their construction of a fort under the direction of Ralph Lane to make the first permanent English settlement in North America.
- August 20 – The Treaty of Nonsuch is signed, committing England to support the Dutch Revolt, thus entering the Eighty Years' War.
- September 11 – In the Ottoman Empire, the rebellion of An-Nasir al-Hasan bin Ali in Yemen is ended when An-Nasir is betrayed and turned over to the Turkish Ottoman governor. An-Nasir spends one year in prison in Sanaa and then brought to Turkey.
- September 15 – English Catholic priest John Adams is banished from England along with 72 other Catholic priests, and transported by ship to Boulogne in France.
- September 21 – King Henry IV of Navarre, who is also the heir presumptive to France's King Henry III, is excommunicated from the Roman Catholic Church by Pope Sixtus V, who effectively declares that French Catholics are not required to recognize his claim to the throne.

==== October–December ====
- October 15 – In Arnhem in the Netherlands, the siege of IJsseloord is completed after nine days as English and Dutch forces recapture the city from Spanish occupiers.
- November 18 – In Mexico City, Álvaro Manrique de Zúñiga becomes Viceroy of New Spain after being appointed by King Philip II of Spain.
- November 27 – A 6.6 magnitude earthquake strikes Japan, and serves a foreshock and a trigger to a deadly 7.9 magnitude earthquake on January 18 that will kill 8,000 people.
- November 28 – Anglo-Spanish War: The island of Santiago in Cape Verde is captured by Francis Drake.
- December 1 – Hadim Mesih Pasha is appointed the new Grand Vizier of the Ottoman Empire by Sultan Murad III.
- December 20 – Enraged by the disrespect shown to him by Yousuf Shah Chak, the Mughal Emperor, Akbar, orders the invasion of Kashmir with 5,000 men.

==== Date unknown ====
- The Kingdom of Luba is founded by Kongolo Mwamba in what is now the Democratic Republic of Congo.
- History of chocolate in Spain: First recorded commercial importation of chocolate to Europe, from Veracruz in Mexico to Seville in Spain.

=== 1587 ===
==== January–March ====
- January 7 – Sir Walter Raleigh appoints John White to be the Governor of the Roanoke Colony, to be established later in the year by English colonists on Roanoke Island off the coast of what is now the U.S. state of North Carolina. White and 121 other colonists depart from Portsmouth on three ships on May 8 and arrive at Croatoan Island on July 22.
- January 14 – In Japan, Chancellor of the Realm Toyotomi Hideyoshi ends Portugal's control of the port of Nagasaki after six years. Omura Sumitada had leased the fishing village to Portuguese Jesuits on August 15, 1580.
- February 5 – (1st waxing of Tabaung 948 ME) King Nanda of Burma appoints his eldest son and heir apparent, Minye Kyawswa II, as Viceroy of Ava, now part of upper Burma, with a capital at Inwa (located in what is now the Mandalay Region of Myanmar.
- February 8 – Mary, Queen of Scots, the monarch of Scotland from 1542 to 1567, is beheaded in front of 300 witnesses at Fotheringhay Castle, seven days after the signing of a death warrant by her cousin, Queen Elizabeth of England. Mary had been convicted of treason for her role in the Babington Plot, a conspiracy to overthrow the English government and to assassinate Elizabeth.
- February 12 – A period of exceptionally severe cold begins in western Europe and lasts until February 24.
- February 27 – Sir Anthony Cope, a member of the English Parliament, is imprisoned in the Tower of London after presenting a Puritan revision of the Anglican Book of Common Prayer to the Speaker of the House of Commons, Sir John Puckering. He is released on March 23.
- March 6 – In west Africa, Álvaro II Nimi a Nkanga becomes the new ruler of the Kingdom of Kongo, with a capital at São Salvador in what is now the city of M'banza-Kongo in the northern part of the Republic of Angola, and including parts of the Republic of the Congo and the Democratic Republic of the Congo. Alvaro II claims the throne upon the dath of his father, Álvaro I Nimi a Lukeni lua Mvemba.
- March 15 – English privateer accepts a commission from the Kingdom to disrupt Spanish freighters trading with Italy.

==== April–June ====
- April 20 – (14th waxing of Kason 949 ME) Burmese–Siamese War (1584–1593): Burma's siege of Ayutthaya (now in Thailand), capital of the Ayutthaya Kingdom, fails after six months as the troops of Burma's King Nanda Bayin begin their withdrawal.
- April 29 – Singeing the King of Spain's Beard: On an expedition against Spain, English privateer Sir Francis Drake leads a raid in the Bay of Cádiz, sinking at least 23 ships of the Spanish fleet.
- May 8 – The second expedition to establish an English colony at Roanoke Island in North America departs from England with two ships, supplies, and 121 people under the command of John White.
- May 19 – John Davis sets out from Dartmouth, Devon, for a third attempt to find the Northwest Passage.
- June 11 – (Tensho 15, 6th day of 5th month); Most of Kyushu is surrendered to Toyotomi Hideyoshi by Yoshihisa Shimazu, 32 days after Hideyoshi's siege of Kagoshima began (on the 3rd day of the 4th month). Hideyoshi follows on July 24 (19th day of the 6th month of Tensho 15) with an order banishing all European Christian missionaries from the province.
- June 20 – Gabriel VIII becomes the new Pontiff of the Coptic Christian Church in Egypt, being enthroned as Pope Gabriel VIII and filling a vacancy that had existed for nine months since the death of Pope John XIV of Alexandria. Gabriel will reign until his death on May 14, 1603.

==== July–September ====
- July 22 – Roanoke Colony: A group of English settlers arrive on Roanoke Island off North Carolina, to re-establish the deserted colony.
- August 18 – According to legend, Saul Wahl is named king of Poland; he is deposed the following day.
- August 19 – Polish and Lithuanian nobles elect Sigismund III Vasa, King of Sweden, as the ruler of the after the death in December of the previous King of Poland and Duke of Lithuania, Stephen Báthory.
- August 22 – A small group of nobles who oppose Sigismund Vasa as King vote to proclaim Maximilian III, Archduke of Austria, as ruler of the Polish–Lithuanian Commonwealth, a decision supported by the Primate of Poland, Stanisław Karnkowski. The divide begins the War of the Polish Succession.
- August 27 – Governor John White leaves the Roanoke Colony to get more supplies from England.
- September 9 – In the Burgundian Netherlands (now part of Belgium), the faculty at the University of Leuven publishes a condemnation of the 34 propositions drawn up by the Jesuit scholar Michel Baius, leading to a campaign by traditional Belgian Catholics against the Jesuits.
- September 22 – In Italy, the coronation of Vincenzo Gonzaga as Duke of Mantua takes place.
- September 28 – At Gremi in what is now the Republic of Georgia, King Alexander II of Kakheti signs an oath of allegiance to Feodor I, the Tsar of all Russia.

==== October–December ====
- October 1 – Shāh ‘Abbās I "The Great" succeeds as Shahanshah of Iran.
- October 7 – Sigismund Vasa and a fleet of Swedish ships land in Poland to confront an invasion by Maximilian III and an Austrian Army.
- October 14 – War of the Polish Succession (1587–1588): Archduke Maximilian of Austria begins the siege of Kraków, while Jan Zamoyski, hetman of the Polish Army, begins the defense of the city.
- October 18 – Landing of the first Filipinos: The first Filipinos in North America land in Morro Bay, near San Luis Obispo in modern-day California.
- October 20 – Battle of Coutras: Huguenot forces under Henry of Navarre defeat Royalist forces under Anne de Joyeuse, favorite of King Henry; Joyeuse is killed.
- October 31 – Leiden University Library opens its doors, after its founding in 1575.
- November 4 – During the circumnavigation of the world by Thomas Cavendish, the English ships capture the Spanish galleon Santa Ana and its treasure of 100 troy pounds of gold (worth 122,000 Spanish pesos) and a total treasure worth 2.1 million pesos.
- November 14 – In Italy, Davide Vacca is elected to a two-year term as the new Doge of the Republic of Genoa in a vote by the Grand Council of the Republic.
- November 22 – A final Austrian attack on Kraków by Archduke Maximilian III is repelled by the Polish defenders.
- November 29 – Maximilian III withdraws his forces and the siege of Kraków ends.
- December 27 – Sigismund III Vasa is formally crowned as King Zygmunt Waza of Poland and Duke of Lithuania in a coronation ceremony at Kraków.

==== Date unknown ====
- A severe famine breaks out in Ming dynasty China.
- The Rose (theatre) is founded in London by Philip Henslowe.
- The chapbook Historia von D. Johann Fausten, printed by Johann Spies in Frankfurt, is the first published version of the Faust story.
- Everard Digby's De Arte Natandi, the first treatise on swimming in England, is published.
- St. Dominic's Church, Macau is established.
- Hailuoto, an island in the Bothnian Bay, is separated from the grand parish of Saloinen into an independent parish.

=== 1588 ===
==== January–March ====
- January 22 – Pope Sixtus V issues the papal bull Immensa aeterni Dei, a major reorganization of the Roman Curia creating 15 congregations of cardinals, including the Congregation of the Index Librorum Prohibitorum, the Church list of forbidden books; the Congregation of the Inquisition; and the Congregation of the Vatican Press.
- January 24 – War of the Polish Succession: The Battle of Pitschen takes place at Pitschen (now Byczyna in Poland, with Polish and Lithuanian troops commanded by the Polish hetman Jan Zamoyski defending against an invading Austrian force commanded by Maximilian III, Archduke of Austria. After his army is routed, Archduke Maximilian surrenders and is taken as a prisoner of war, and will be held for more than a year until his release is compelled by the intervention of Pope Sixtus V.
- February 9 – The sudden death of Álvaro de Bazán, 1st Marquis of Santa Cruz, in the midst of preparations for the Spanish Armada, forces King Philip II of Spain to re-allocate the command of the fleet.
- February 18 – In what is now Sri Lanka, the siege of Colombo by King Rajasinha I of Sitawaka ends when Portuguese Admiral Pedro Teixeira arrives with a fleet of 80 ships and frees the capital of Portuguese Ceylon. King Rajasinha and his troops flee back to his capital at Seethawakapura.
- March 20 – The ascension of Shah Abbas I as Emperor in Iran, of the Safavid Empire, is made official on the first day of the New Year on the Zoroastrian Calendar. Abbas has ruled since October 16, 1587.
- March 25 – The English Army begins the recruitment of volunteers to prepare for the expected invasion by Spain. On April 10, 1593, the English Parliament will enact the first military pension, "An Acte for relief of Soudiours", providing that "forasmuch as it is agreable with Christian Charity Policy and the Honor of our Nation, that shuch as have since the 25th day of March 1588, adventured their lives and lost their limbs or disabled their bodies, or shall hereafter adventure the lives, lose their limbs or disable their bodies, in defence and service of Her Majesty and the State, should at their return be relieved and rewarded to the end that they may reap the fruit of their good deservings, and others may be encouraged to perform like endeavors..."

==== April–June ====
- April 4 – Christian IV becomes king of Denmark–Norway, upon the death of his father, Frederick II.
- May 12 – Day of the Barricades in Paris: Henry I, Duke of Guise seizes the city, forcing King Henry III to flee.
- May 28 – The Spanish Armada, with 130 ships and 30,000 men, begins to set sail from the Tagus estuary, under the command of the Duke of Medina Sedonia and Juan Martínez de Recalde, heading for the English Channel (it will take until May 30 for all of the ships to leave port).
- June 18 – Sailing across the South Atlantic Ocean towards England, near the end of their voyage around the world, Thomas Cavendish and his East India Company fleet stumble across the Portuguese-controlled island of Saint Helena. While Saint Helena has been under the control of Portugal for 80 years, England had been unaware of its existence.
- June 19 – Twenty days after departing from Spain, the Spanish Armada receives a foreshadowing of disaster to come during the summer as a storm scatters part of the fleet, postponing the invasion. Alonso de Guzmán y Sotomayor, Duke of Medina Sidonia and commander of the Spanish expedition, returns the fleet to the port of Coruna for repairs, and writes a letter to King Philip, urging him to abandon plans for invasion of England, and to reach an honorable settlement, but the King refuses. The Spanish expedition resumes on July 21.

==== July–September ====
- July 15 – At Rouen, King Henry III of France gives in to the latest demands of the Catholic League and the Duke of Guise, and signs the Edict of Union, agreeing to not allow French Protestants to participate in government, in return for being able to return to Paris.
- July 31 – The first engagement between the English and Spanish fleets (off Plymouth) results in a victory for the English, under command of Lord Howard of Effingham and Sir Francis Drake.
- August 2 – The English fleet defeats the Spanish fleet, off the Isle of Portland.
- August 7 – The English fleet defeats the Spanish fleet off the coast of Flanders.
- August 8 (July 29 Old Style) – Battle of Gravelines: The Spanish Armada is defeated by the English naval force off the coast of Gravelines, in the Spanish Netherlands (modern France).
- August 9 – The Duke of Medina Sidonia, commander of the Spanish Armada, decides to return the fleet to Spain after two days of trying to reach the coast of Flanders, to meet up with the army of the Duke of Parma.
- August 12 – Much of the Spanish Armada is destroyed by storms during an attempt to around Scotland and Ireland. The fleeing Spanish fleet sails past the Firth of Forth, and the English call off their pursuit, avoiding the storm entirely.
- August 19 (August 9 Old Style) – Speech to the Troops at Tilbury by Queen Elizabeth I.
- August 29 (8th day of the 7th month, Tensho 16) – In Japan, the Chancellor of the Realm, Toyotomi Hideyoshi, issues an edict for the katanagari (the sword hunt), the confiscation of swords from any persons thought to be opposed to his rule.
- September 1 – The Ganja Fortress in what is now Azerbaijan is captured by Ottoman general Serdar Ferhad Pasha.
- September 9 – English captain Thomas Cavendish and a fleet of ships complete sailing around the world in a record time of 781 days, returning to Plymouth more than two years after setting off on July 21, 1586. The previous record had been 1,018 days by the expedition of Sir Francis Drake from 1577 to 1580. By the time of his return, Cavendish has only his flagship, Desire, after having started with the two other vessels, the warship Content, and the 40-ton supply ship Hugh Gallant.
- September 13 – Dutch General Charles III de Croÿ captures the German city of Bonn in the Electorate of Cologne.

==== October–December ====
- October 7 – The first biography of Nicolaus Copernicus (d.1543) is completed by Bernardino Baldi.
- November 13 – Dutch Republic and English forces capture Bergen op Zoom, a fortress in the Spanish Netherlands, after a siege of 41 days.
- November 15 – The English Navy ship Great Spaniard, formerly the Spanish Armada ship San Salvador until its capture on August 1, sinks off of the coast of England's Isle of Purbeck, with the loss of 23 of the 57 crew. The survivors are rescued by an English man-o-war boat.
- December 5 – The Order of Augustinian Recollects is formally recognised as a separate province from the Order of Saint Augustine, an event later known as the Día de la Recolección or Day of Recollection.
- December 23 – Henry III of France strikes his ultra-Catholic enemies, having the Duke of Guise and his brother, Louis II, Cardinal of Guise, killed, and holding the Cardinal de Bourbon a prisoner. As a result, large parts of France reject Henry III as their king, forcing him to side with Henry of Navarre.

==== Unknown ====
- William Morgan's Welsh translation of the Bible is published.
- The Armada Portrait of Elizabeth I of England is created, to celebrate the English defeat of the Spanish Armada, and to assert the strength of Elizabeth herself.

=== 1589 ===
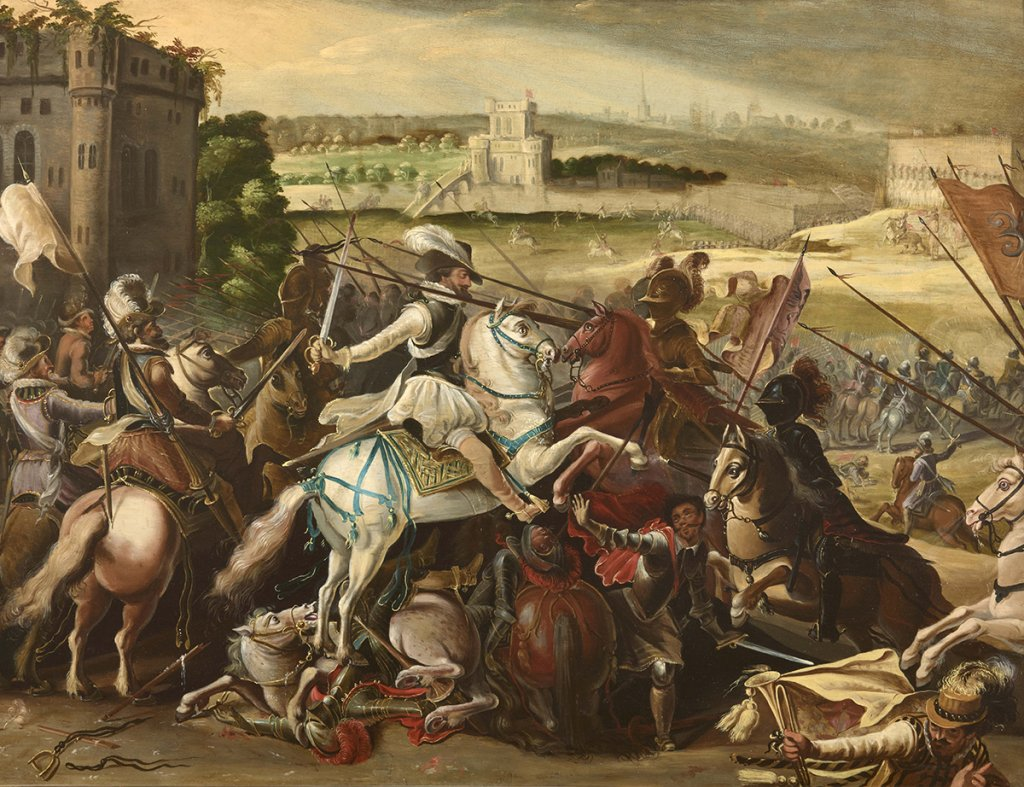
September 15–September 18: Battle of Arques

==== January–March ====
- January 5 – The reign of Catherine de' Medici as Countess of Auvergne ends after 64 years and she is succeeded by her grandson, Charles de Valois.
- January 7 – The College of Sorbonne votes a resolution that it is just and necessary to depose King Henry III of France, and that any private citizen is morally free to commit regicide.
- January 17 – The French city of Chartres closes its gates to King Henry III and subsequently recognizes 65-year-old Charles I, Cardinal de Bourbon as King Charles X.
- January 26 – Job of Moscow is elected as the first Patriarch of Moscow and All Russia.
- February 6 – King Philip of Portugal issues an order to the Viceroy in Portuguese India (Goa) for the arrest of explorer João da Gama, but da Gama continues toward Mexico without being aware of the order.
- February 26 – Valkendorfs Kollegium is founded in Copenhagen, Denmark.
- March 6
  - Ralph Fitch becomes the first known person from England to set foot on the island of Ceylon (now Sri Lanka) and stays five days.
  - The Admiralty of the Noorderkwartier is set up as the third of the five admiralties in the Dutch Republic.
- March 8 – England prohibits the construction of a cottage on any property that isn't at least four acres in size, with the passage of the Erection of Cottages Act 1588.
- March 9 – The Treaty of Bytom and Będzin is signed between the Polish–Lithuanian Commonwealth and Austria, ending the War of the Polish Succession. Maximilian III, Archduke of Austria, renounces his claims to the thrones of Poland and Lithuania and acknowledges Sigismund III Vasa of Sweden as the heir to the throne.

==== April–June ====
- April 13 – An English Armada, led by Sir Francis Drake and Sir John Norreys, and largely financed by private investors, sets sail to attack the Iberian Peninsula's Atlantic coast, but fails to achieve any naval advantage.
- May 2 – Girolamo Bargagli's play The Pilgrim Woman is given its first performance, premiering in Florence, three years after Bargagli's death.
- May 4 – In Spain, María Pita leads the defense of La Coruña against the English Armada after her husband is killed by a crossbow."
- May 11 – The Earl of Bothwell, accused of treason against the Crown of Scotland, surrenders along with the Earl of Huntly and is imprisoned at Holyrood Palace. Convicted on May 24, the conspirators are never sentenced and set free by King James VI.
- May 17 – Ercole Grimaldi becomes the new Lord of Monaco upon the death of his older brother Charles II.
- June 28 – On the island of Sumatra in what is now Indonesia, the Sultan of Aceh Darussalam, Ali Ri'ayat Syah II, is assassinated by a group of nobles dissatisfied with his rule. He becomes the fourth Sultan in a row to be murdered. Sayyid al-Mukammal is approved by the nobles as the new Sultan of Aceh.

==== July–September ====
- July 1 – The English Armada, commanded by Sir Francis Drake, returns to Portsmouth after almost three months of pillaging the Spanish kingdoms.
- July 4 – Jeremias II Tranos is appointed as the Patriarch of Constantinople, leader of the Eastern Orthodox Church, by Ottoman Sultan Murad III.
- July 8 – Jan Zamoyski, the Hetman of Poland since 1581, establishes the largest family trust in the Kingdom. The Zamoyski family trust will last for more than 350 years until being abolished in 1944.
- July 17 – (Tensho 17, 5th day of 6th month); The Battle of Suriagehara takes place in Japan between the Date and Katakura clans and the Ashina, Satake and Nikaido clans. Date Masamune leads the two clans to victory over Satake Yoshinobu.
- July 23 – Abbas the Great, who has recently become the Safavid Emperor of Persia, arranges the assassination of his benefactor, the Viceroy Murshid Qoli Khan at a banquet.
- August 1 – King Henry III of France is assassinated by a fanatical Dominican friar Jacques Clément, who approaches the King on the pretext of delivering a secret message. Henry tells his guards to stand aside, and Clément approaches and fatally stabs the King. Clément is subsequently killed by the guards. King Henry dies the next day.
- August 2 – Following the death of Henry III of France, his army is thrown into confusion and an attempt to retake Paris is abandoned. Henry of Navarre succeeds to the throne as King Henry IV of France, but is not recognized by the Catholic League, who acclaim the imprisoned Charles, Cardinal de Bourbon, as the rightful King of France, Charles X.
- August 20 – King James VI of Scotland, the future James I of England, contracts a proxy marriage with the 14-year-old Anne of Denmark at Kronborg. The formal ceremony takes place on November 23 at the Old Bishop's Palace in Oslo.
- September 21 – Battle of Arques: King Henry IV of France's forces defeat those of the Catholic League, under Charles of Lorraine, Duke of Mayenne (younger brother of Henry I, Duke of Guise).

==== October–December ====
- October 22 – King James VI of Scotland sails to Norway to meet his bride, Anne of Denmark as part of a fleet of six Scottish Navy ships, and is accompanied by Lord Maitland of Thirlestane, the Lord Chancellor of Scotland.
- October 26 – Japanese warlord Date Masamune and his forces capture the Sukagawa Castle, defended by his aunt Onamihime Nikaido, after her assistant Hodohara Yukifuji betrays her.
- October 31 – Alleged serial killer and accused werewolf Peter Stumpp 'the Werewolf of Bedburg' is tortured and executed.
- November 1 – Henry IV of France is repulsed in an attempt to capture Paris from the Catholic League.
- November 21 – At Oslo, Patrick Vans, Lord Barnbarroch ratifies the marriage contract between King James VI of Scotland, and Anne of Denmark.
- December 10 – In India, Man Singh I becomes the new raja of the Kingdom of Amber (now part of the Rajasthan state) upon the death of his father, Bhagwant Das.
- December 25 (Christmas Day) – The monks of the Pechenga Monastery, the northernmost in the world, are massacred by Swedes, led by a Finnish peasant chief, in the course of the Russo-Swedish War.

==== Date unknown ====
- San Luigi dei Francesi, Rome, is completed by Domenico Fontana.
- Hiroshima is founded, by the Japanese warlord Mōri Terumoto.
- The Hofbräuhaus is founded, by William V, Duke of Bavaria, in Munich.

== Births ==
1580

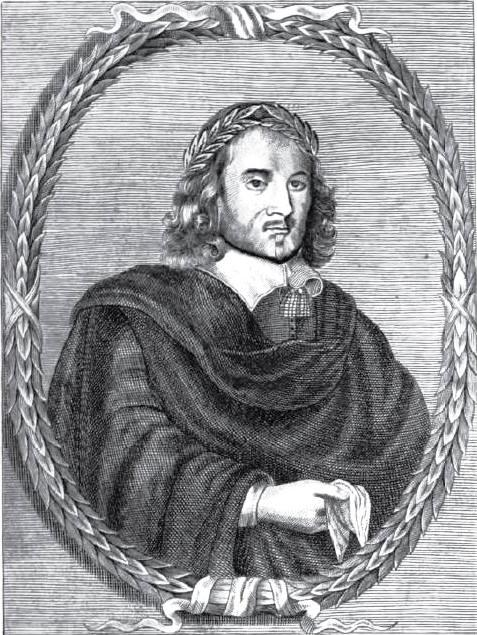
Thomas Middleton

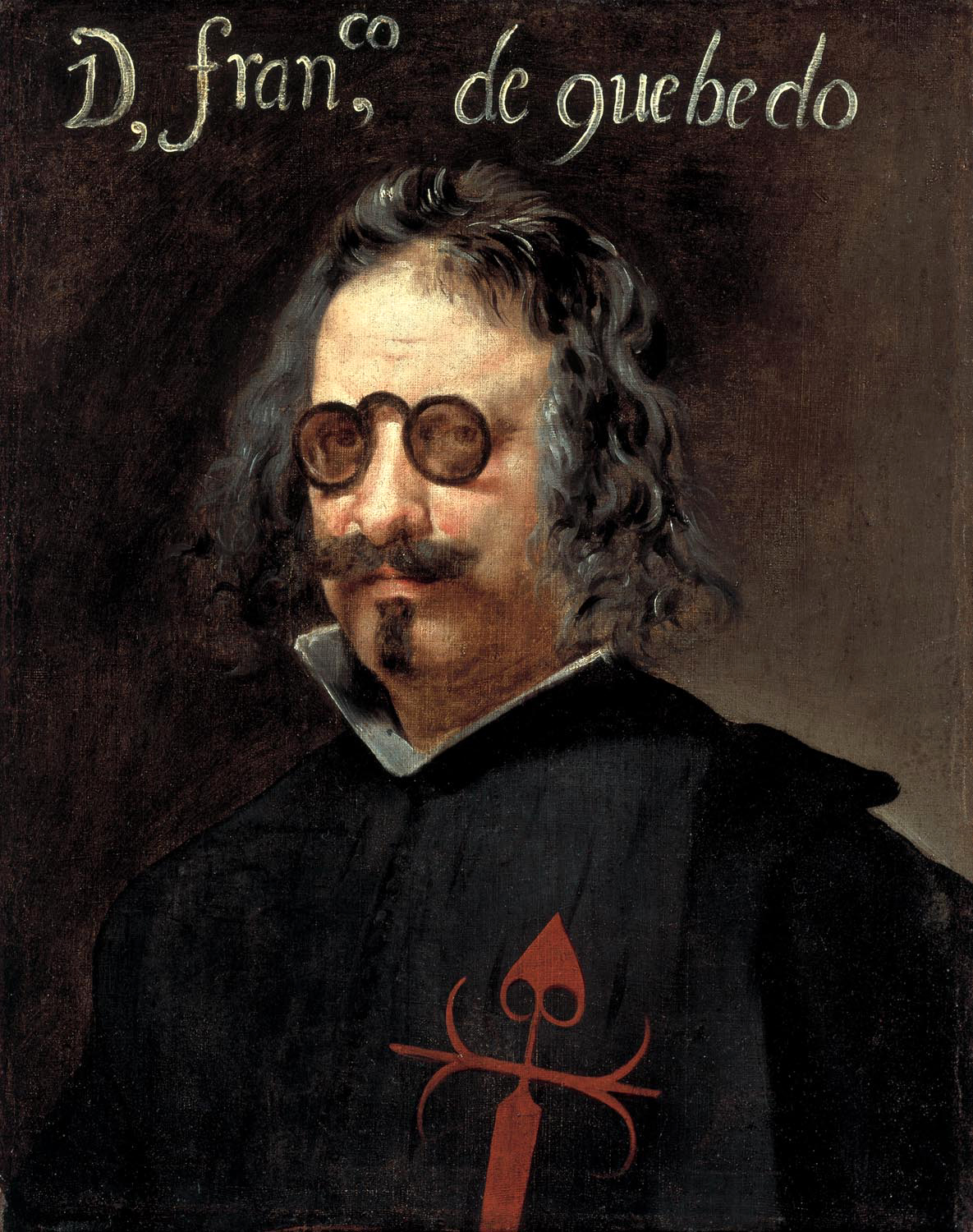
Francisco de Quevedo

- January 8 – Jens Hermansson Juel, Stattholder of Norway (d. 1634)
- January 12
  - Jan Baptist van Helmont, Flemish chemist (d. 1644)
  - Alexander Ruthven, Scottish earl (d. 1600)
- January 20 – Stefano Amadei, Italian painter (d. 1644)
- January 29 – Willem Isaacsz Swanenburg, Dutch engraver (d. 1612)
- January 30 – Gundakar, Prince of Liechtenstein, court official in Vienna (d. 1658)
- January – John Smith, English explorer and Virginia settler (d. 1631)
- February – John Digby, 1st Earl of Bristol, English diplomat (d. 1653)
- February 1 – Francis Fane, 1st Earl of Westmorland, English noble (d. 1629)
- February 2 – Jens Bjelke, Norwegian noble (d. 1659)
- February 22 – Charles de l'Aubespine, marquis de Châteauneuf, French diplomat and government official (d. 1653)
- February 24 – Matthias Hoe von Hoenegg, German theologian (d. 1645)
- February 28
  - Orazio Giustiniani, Italian Catholic cardinal (d. 1649)
  - Giovanni Srofenaur, Italian musician (d. 1634)
- March 31 – Bogislaw XIV, Duke of Pomerania (d. 1637)
- April 8
  - Augusta of Denmark, Duchess Consort of Holstein-Gottorp (1596-1616) (d. 1639)
  - William Herbert, 3rd Earl of Pembroke, English noble, courtier and patron of the arts (d. 1630)
- April 18 – (baptism) Thomas Middleton, English playwright (d. 1627)
- April 24 – Miguel Avellán, Spanish Catholic prelate, Auxiliary Bishop of Toledo from 1633 (d. 1650)
- May 5
  - Johann Faulhaber, German mathematician (d. 1635)
  - Richard Webb, English settler in America (d. 1665)
- May 6 – Charles Gonzaga, Duke of Mantua and Montferrat, French noble (d. 1637)
- May 14 – Bassam Al-Soukaria, Lebanese army commander (d. 1667)
- May 30 – Fadrique de Toledo, 1st Marquis of Villanueva de Valdueza, Spanish noble and admiral (d. 1634)
- June 6 – Godefroy Wendelin, Flemish astronomer (d. 1667)
- June 9 – Daniel Heinsius, Dutch scholar (d. 1655)
- June 12 – Adriaan van Stalbemt, Flemish Baroque painter (d. 1662)
- June 14 – Elisabeth Magdalena of Pomerania, German duchess (d. 1649)
- June 26
  - Gaspar de Borja y Velasco, Spanish Catholic cardinal (d. 1645)
  - Peter Claver, Spanish Jesuit priest (d. 1654)
- July 5 – Carlo Contarini, Doge of Venice (d. 1656)
- July 6 – Johann Stobäus, German composer (d. 1646)
- July 10 – Humphrey Chetham, English merchant (d. 1653)
- July 18 – Giovanni Giacomo Semenza, Italian painter (d. 1638)
- July 29 – Francesco Mochi, Italian early-Baroque sculptor (d. 1654)
- August 2 – Prince Jeongwon, Korean prince (d. 1619)
- August 19 – Pierre Vernier, French mathematician (d. 1637)
- September 4 – George Percy, English explorer (d. 1632)
- September 14
  - Francisco de Quevedo, Spanish writer (d. 1645)
  - Robert Gordon of Straloch, Scottish cartographer (d. 1661)
- September 15
  - Charles Annibal Fabrot, French lawyer (d. 1659)
  - Thomas Fanshawe, English politician (d. 1631)
- September 17 – Countess Charlotte Brabantina of Nassau, Belgian noble (d. 1631)
- September 24 – Elisabeth of Schleswig-Holstein-Sonderburg, Duchess consort of Pomerania (d. 1653)
- October 8 – Gábor Esterházy (1580–1626), Hungarian noble (d. 1626)
- October 12 – Hortensio Félix Paravicino, Spanish preacher and poet from the noble house of Pallavicini (d. 1633)
- October 20 – Peter Crüger, German astronomer and mathematician (d. 1639)
- October 30 – Armand-Nompar de Caumont, duc de La Force, Marshal of France (d. 1675)
- November 9 – Johannes Narssius, Dutch physician and poet (d. 1637)
- December 1 – Nicolas-Claude Fabri de Peiresc, French astronomer (d. 1637)
- December 4
  - Samuel Argall, English adventurer and naval officer (d. 1626)
  - Nabeshima Katsushige, Japanese daimyō (d. 1657)
- date unknown
  - Philipp Clüver, German geographer and historian (d. 1623)
  - Francesco Fontana, Italian lawyer and astronomer (d. 1656)
  - Dirk Hartog, Dutch ship's captain and explorer (d. 1621)
  - Jean Jannon, Swiss-born typefounder (d. 1658)
  - Robert Killigrew, English courtier, politician, ambassador and knight (d. 1633)
  - Willebrord Snellius, Dutch astronomer and mathematician (d. 1626)
  - Raphael Sobiehrd-Mnishovsky, Bohemian lawyer and writer (d. 1644)
  - Pierre Vernier, French mathematician and instrument inventor (d. 1637)
  - Krzysztof Zbaraski, Polish nobleman (d. 1627)
  - George Calvert, 1st Baron Baltimore, English politician and colonizer (d. 1623)
- probable
  - William Brabazon, 1st Earl of Meath, English noble (d. 1651)
  - Edward Fairfax, English translator (d. 1635)
  - Frans Hals, Dutch painter (d. 1666)
  - Alexander Leslie, 1st Earl of Leven, Scottish soldier (d. 1661)
  - Benjamin, Duke of Soubise, French Huguenot leader (d. 1642)
  - Adriana Basile, Italian composer (d. 1640)

1581

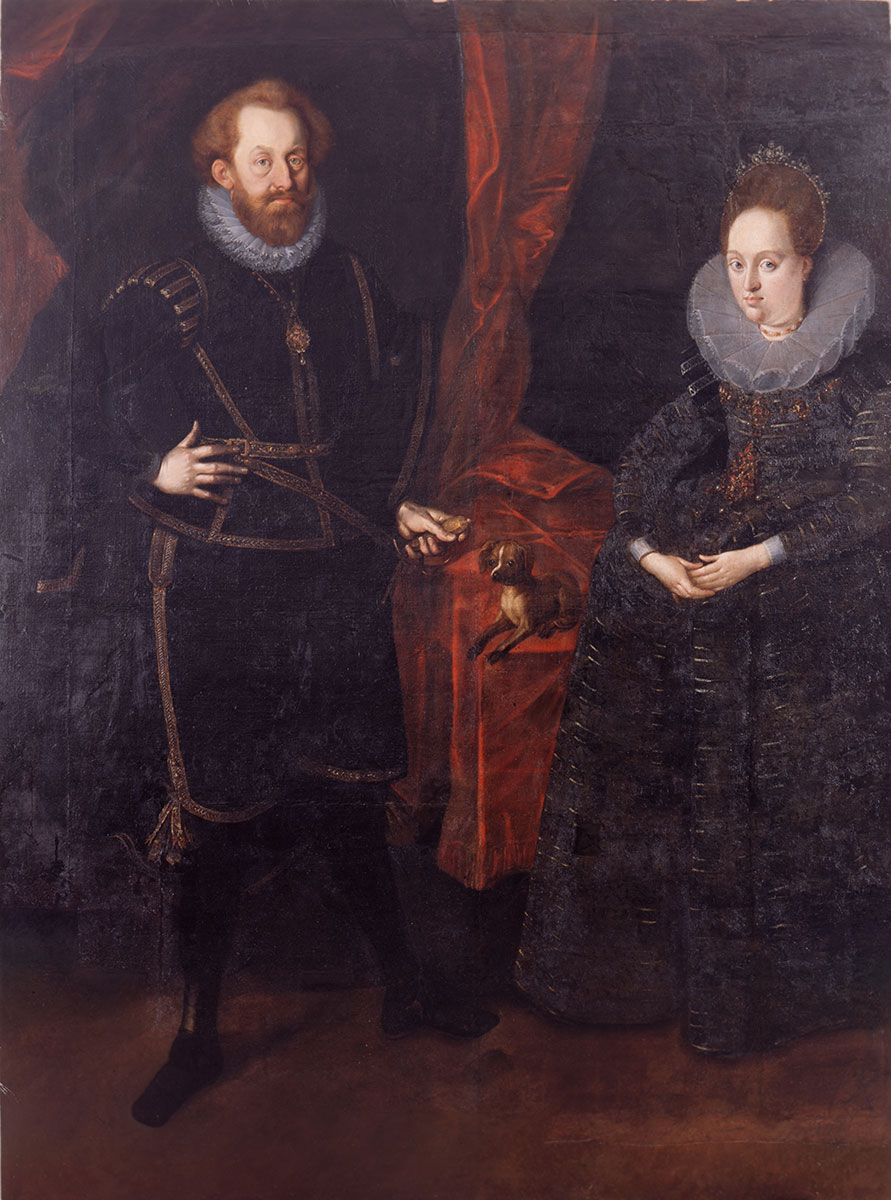
Countess Palatine Dorothea of Simmern

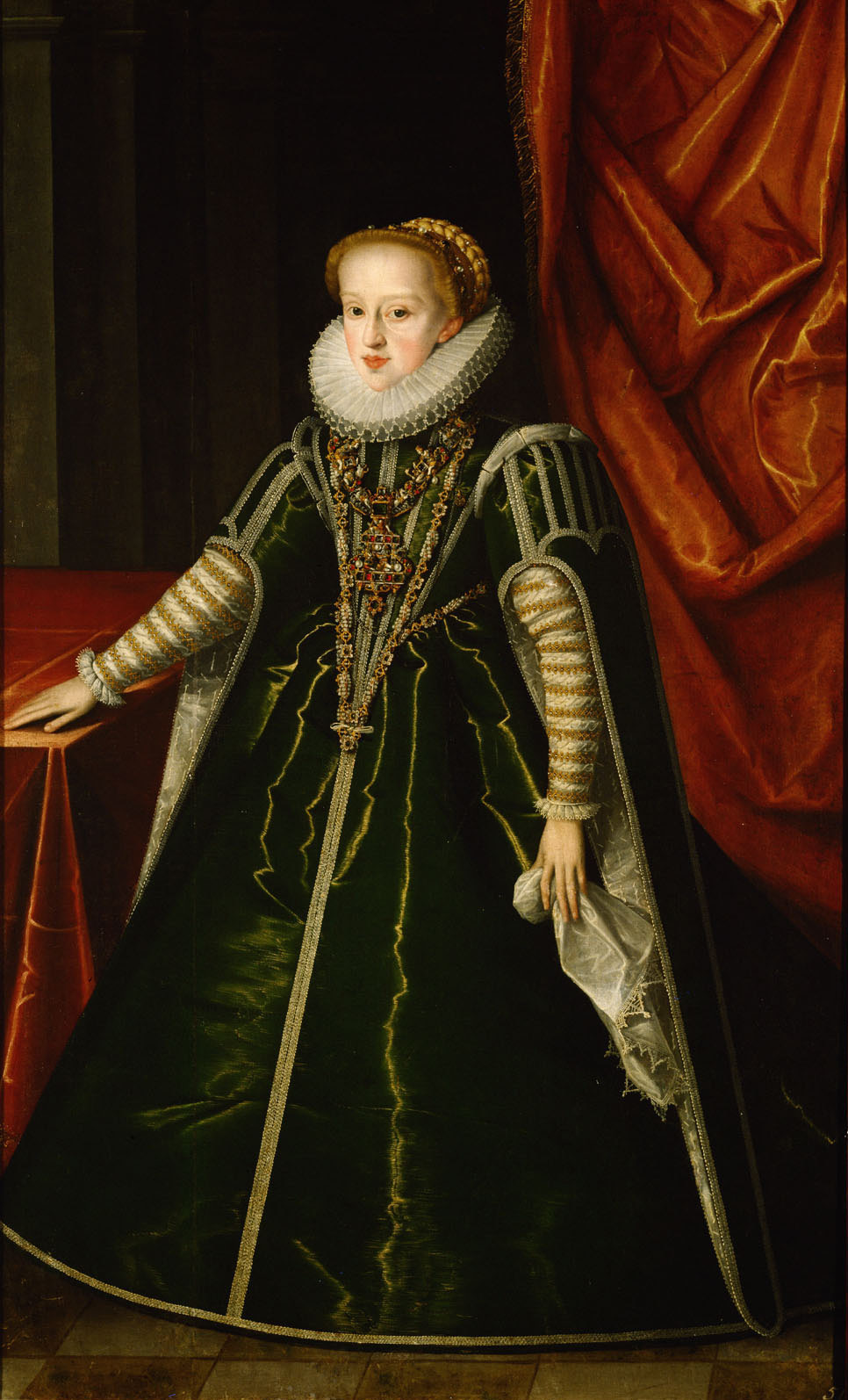
Archduchess Gregoria Maximiliana of Austria

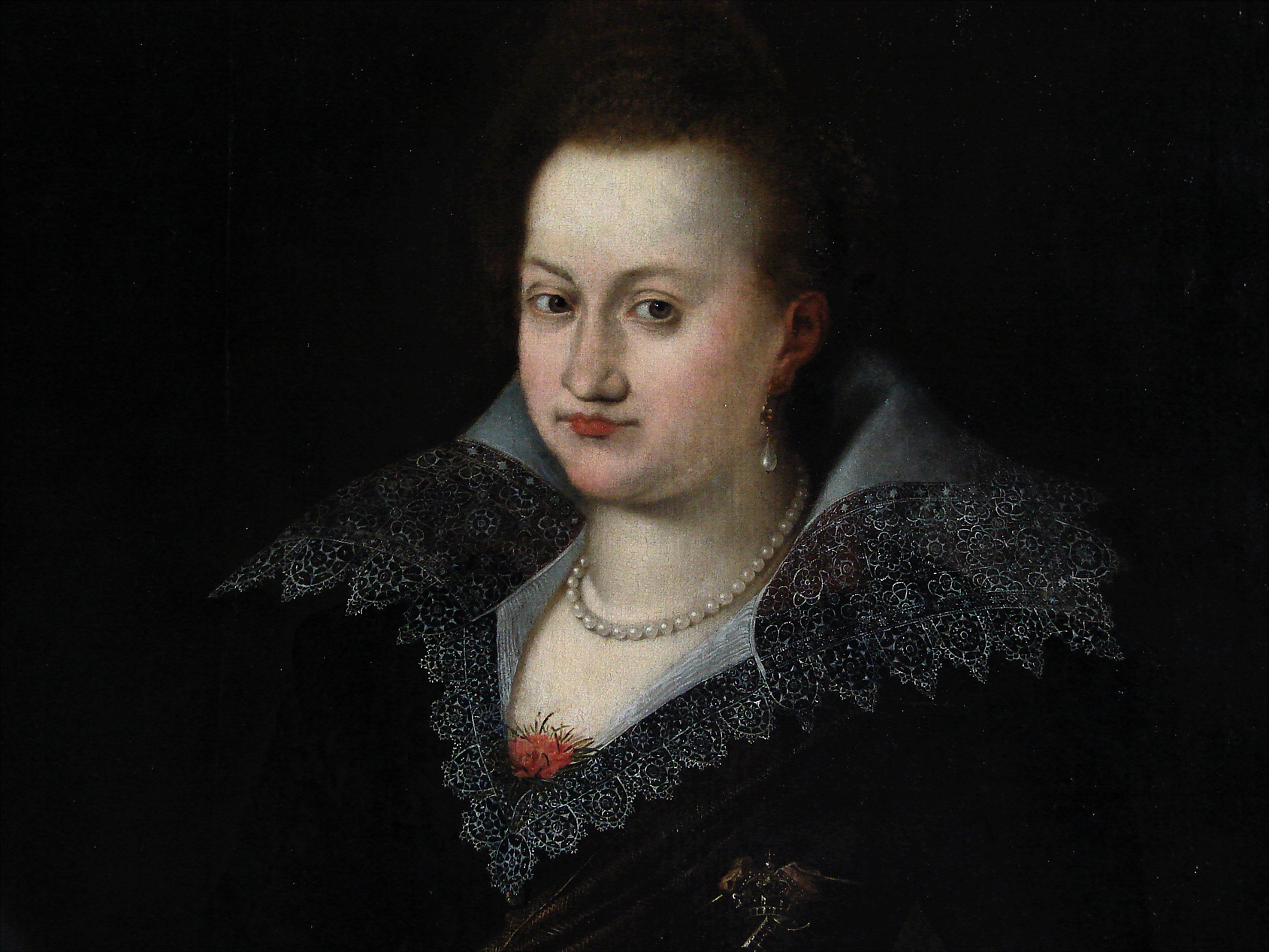
Princess Hedwig of Denmark

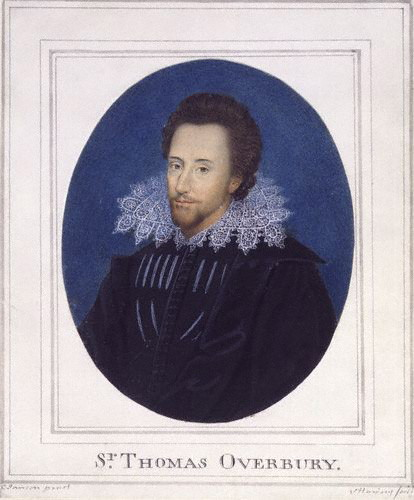
Thomas Overbury

- January 4 – James Ussher, Anglo-Irish priest and scholar (d. 1656)
- January 6 – Countess Palatine Dorothea of Simmern, Princess consort of Anhalt-Dessau (d. 1631)
- January 30 – Christian, Margrave of Brandenburg-Bayreuth (1603–1655) (d. 1655)
- February 17 – Fausto Poli, Italian Catholic prelate and cardinal (d. 1653)
- March 16 – Pieter Corneliszoon Hooft, Dutch historian (d. 1647)
- April 24 – Vincent de Paul, French Roman Catholic priest who dedicated himself to serving the poor (d. 1660)
- May 4 – Arnold Möller, German calligrapher (d. 1655)
- May 21 – Robert More, English politician (d. 1626)
- May 22 – Archduchess Gregoria Maximiliana of Austria, Austrian archduchess (d. 1597)
- June 21 – Edward Barrett, 1st Lord Barrett of Newburgh, English politician (d. 1645)
- June 27 – Louis Günther I, Count of Schwarzburg-Rudolstadt (1630–1646) (d. 1646)
- July 18 – Pier Luigi Carafa, Italian Catholic cardinal (d. 1655)
- July 20 – Isidoro Bianchi, Italian painter (d. 1662)
- July 25 – Brian Twyne, English archivist (d. 1644)
- August 5 – Hedwig of Denmark, Danish princess (d. 1641)
- August 15 – Jeremias Drexel, Jesuit writer of devotional literature and a professor of the humanities and rhetoric (d. 1638)
- September 21 – Simon Archer, English politician (d. 1662)
- September 27 – Juan Damián López de Haro, Spanish Catholic bishop of Puerto Rico (d. 1648)
- October 9 – Claude Gaspard Bachet de Méziriac, French mathematician (d. 1638)
- October 21 – Domenico Zampieri, Italian painter (d. 1641)
- November 1 – William Hockmere, English politician (d. 1626)
- November 11 – Edward Popham, English politician (d. 1641)
- November 18 – Carlo I Cybo-Malaspina, marquisate of Massa (d. 1662)
- November 26 – Frederick, Duke of Schleswig-Holstein-Sønderburg-Norburg (d. 1658)
- December 17 – Walter Davison, English poet (d. 1600)
- December 26 – Philip III, Landgrave of Hesse-Butzbach (1609–1643) (d. 1643)
- December 27 – Jean Chalette, French painter (d. 1643)
- date unknown
  - Gasparo Aselli, Italian physician (d. 1626)
  - Jeremias Drexel, German Jesuit writer of devotional literature
  - Edmund Gunter, English mathematician (d. 1626)
  - Jean du Vergier de Hauranne, French monk who introduced Jansenism into France (d. 1643)
  - Charles Malapert, Belgian Jesuit writer (d. 1630)
  - Giulia Tofana, Italian poisoner (d. 1651)
  - Łukasz Opaliński (1581–1654), Polish nobleman (d. 1654)
  - Thomas Overbury, English poet and essayist (d. 1613)
  - Johannes Rudbeckius, bishop at Västerås (d. 1646)
  - Choghtu Khong Tayiji, ruler of the Khalkha Mongols (d. 1637)
- probable
  - Juan Ruiz de Alarcón, Mexican dramatist (d. 1639)
  - Sisto Badalocchio, Italian painter and engraver (d. 1647)

1582

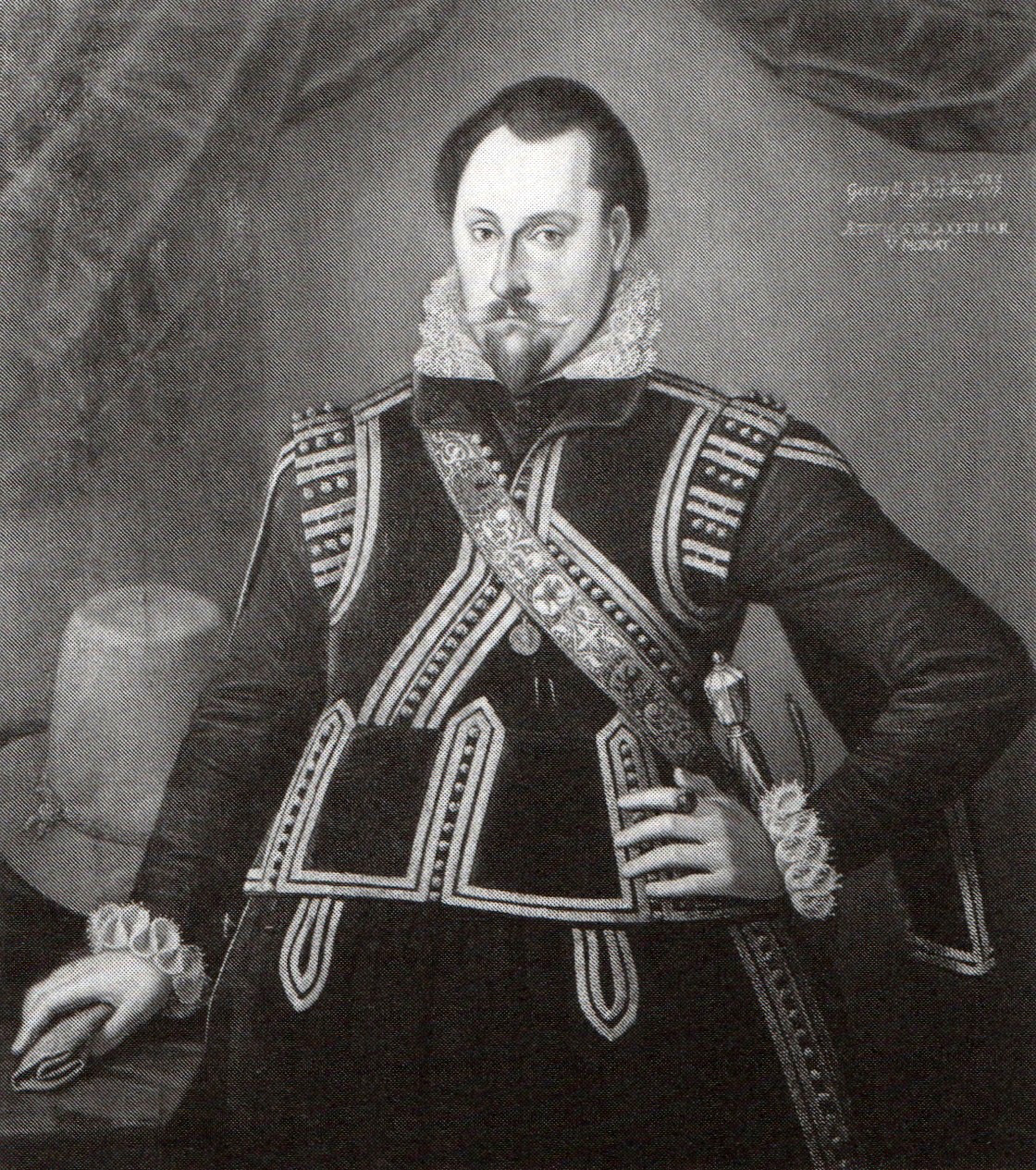
George II, Duke of Pomerania

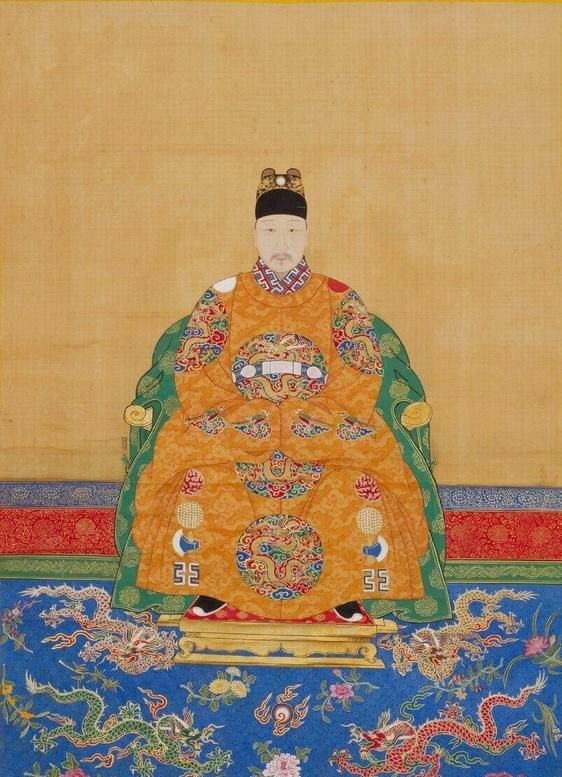
Taichang Emperor

- January 6
  - Alonso de Contreras, Spanish privateer and writer (d. 1641)
  - Jaroslav Borzita of Martinice, Bohemian noble (d. 1649)
- January 7 – Magdalene of Brandenburg, Landgravine consort of Hesse-Darmstadt (1598–1616) (d. 1616)
- January 26 – Giovanni Lanfranco, Italian painter (d. 1647)
- January 28 – John Barclay, Scottish satirist and Latin poet (d. 1621)
- January 30 – George II, Duke of Pomerania (d. 1617)
- February 8 – Matthias Bernegger, German philologist (d. 1640)
- February 17 – George, Duke of Brunswick-Lüneburg (d. 1641)
- February 22 – John Ratcliffe, English politician and soldier (d. 1627)
- March 15
  - Daniel Featley, English theologian and controversialist (d. 1645)
  - Deodat del Monte, Flemish painter, architect (d. 1644)
- March 22 – John Williams, Welsh clergyman and political advisor to King James I (d. 1650)
- March 31 – Duchess Sophie of Prussia, Duchess consort of Courland (1609–1610) (d. 1610)
- April 8 – (bapt.) Phineas Fletcher, English poet (d. 1650)
- April 11 – Justus de Harduwijn, Dutch Catholic priest and poet (d. 1636)
- May 1 – Marco da Gagliano, Italian composer of the early Baroque era (d. 1643)
- May 5 – John Frederick, Duke of Württemberg (1608–1628) (d. 1628)
- June 26 – Johannes Schultz, German composer (d. 1653)
- June 28 – William Fiennes, 1st Viscount Saye and Sele, English nobleman and politician (d. 1662)
- July 27 – Sir John Isham, 1st Baronet, English Member of Parliament (d. 1651)
- August 11 – Sabina Catharina of East Frisia, Countess of Rietberg (1586–1618) (d. 1618)
- August 17 – John Matthew Rispoli, major Maltese philosopher of great erudition (d. 1639)
- August 26 – Humilis of Bisignano, Italian Franciscan friar and saint (d. 1637)
- August 27 – Maria Amalia of Nassau-Dillenburg, German noble (d. 1635)
- August 28
  - Taichang Emperor, of the Ming Dynasty of China (d. 1620)
  - Hans Meinhard von Schönberg, German military commander (d. 1616)
- September 25 – Archduchess Eleanor of Austria (d. 1620)
- September 26 – Eitel Frederick von Hohenzollern-Sigmaringen, German Catholic cardinal (d. 1625)
- October 2 – Augustus, Count Palatine of Sulzbach, Count Palatine of Neuburg (1614–1632) (d. 1632)
- October 17 – Johann Gerhard, Lutheran church leader (d. 1637)
- October 19 – Dmitri Ivanovich, Russian Tsarevich (d. 1591)
- October 21 – John Ernest of Nassau-Siegen, German general (d. 1617)
- October 22 – Francesco Piccolomini, Italian Jesuit (d. 1651)
- November 2 – Elizabeth Jane Weston, English Czech poet (d. 1612)
- November 21 – François Maynard, French poet (d. 1646)
- November 27 – Pierre Dupuy, French historian (d. 1651)
- November 30 – Anselm Casimir Wambold von Umstadt, Archbishop of Mainz (d. 1647)
- December 10 – William Chappell, Irish bishop (d. 1649)
- December 16 – Robert Bertie, 1st Earl of Lindsey, English adventurer and soldier (d. 1642)
- December 23 – Severo Bonini, Italian composer (d. 1663)
- date unknown
  - Giovanni Francesco Abela, Maltese writer (d. 1655)
  - Giulio Alenio, Italian Jesuit missionary (d. 1649)
  - Gregorio Allegri, Italian composer (d. 1652)
  - John Bainbridge, English astronomer (d. 1648)
  - Richard Corbet, English poet and bishop (d. 1635)
  - William Juxon, Archbishop of Canterbury (d. 1663)
  - Thomas Moulson, Lord Mayor of London (d. 1638)
  - David Teniers the Elder, Flemish painter (d. 1649)
  - Francis Windebank, English politician (d. 1646)
  - Jacomina de Witte, politically influential Dutch woman (d. 1661)
  - Jakub Zadzik, Polish nobleman and diplomat (d. 1642)
- probable – Sigismondo d'India, Italian composer (d. 1629)

1583

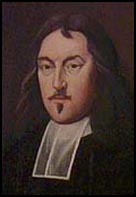
Peter Bulkley

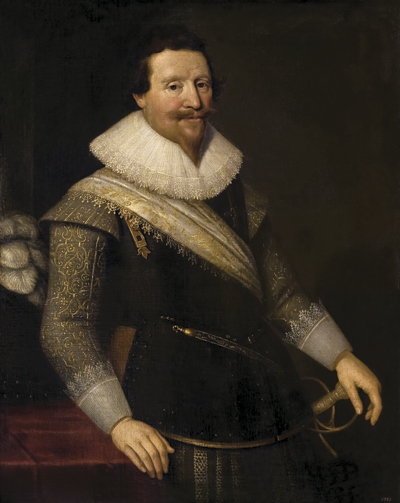
Albrecht von Wallenstein

- January 8 – Simon Episcopius, Dutch theologian (d. 1643)
- January 12 – Niccolò Alamanni, Greek-born Roman antiquarian (d. 1626)
- January 31 – Peter Bulkley, English and later American Puritan (d. 1659)
- February 4 – John Ley, English priest (d. 1662)
- February 17 – Johann Heinrich Alting, German Lutheran theologian (d. 1644)
- February 23 – Jean-Baptiste Morin, French mathematician (d. 1656)
- March 3 – Edward Herbert, 1st Baron Herbert of Cherbury, English diplomat, poet, and philosopher (d. 1648)
- April 4 – Franciscus Quaresmius, Italian writer and orientalist (d. 1650)
- April 8 – Nikolaus, Count Esterházy, Hungarian noble (d. 1645)
- April 10 – Hugo Grotius, Dutch philosopher and writer (d. 1645)
- May 1 – Orazio Grassi, Italian Jesuit priest, architect and scientist (d. 1654)
- May 10 – Fernando Afán de Ribera, duke of Alcalá de los Gazules, Spanish diplomat (d. 1637)
- May 26 – Susanna Hall, Daughter of William Shakespeare (d. 1649)
- June 16 – Axel Oxenstierna, Lord High Chancellor of Sweden (d. 1654)
- June 20 – Jacob De la Gardie, Swedish soldier and statesman (d. 1652)
- June 22 – Joachim Ernst, Margrave of Brandenburg-Ansbach (1603–1625) (d. 1625)
- June 27 – Christopher von Dohna, German politician and scholar (d. 1637)
- July 2 – Dodo Knyphausen, German soldier (d. 1636)
- July 9 – John, Prince of Schleswig-Holstein, Danish prince (d. 1602)
- July 20 – Alban Roe, English Benedictine martyr (d. 1642)
- July 22 – Jacobus Trigland, Dutch theologian (d. 1654)
- August 19 – Daišan, Manchu politician (d. 1648)
- August 21
  - Denis Pétau, French Jesuit theologian (d. 1652)
  - Eleanor of Prussia, Electress consort of Brandenburg (d. 1607)
- August 26 – Adam, Count of Schwarzenberg, German politician (d. 1641)
- August 31 – Richard Harrison, English politician (d. 1655)
- September 23 – Christian II, Elector of Saxony from 1591 to 1611 (d. 1611)
- September 24 – Albrecht von Wallenstein, Austrian general (d. 1634)
- September 29 – John VIII, Count of Nassau-Siegen (1623–1638) (d. 1638)
- September – Girolamo Frescobaldi, Italian composer (d. 1643)
- October 22 – Laurens Reael, Dutch admiral (d. 1637)
- November 10 – Anthony Günther, Count of Oldenburg (d. 1667)
- November 15 – Théophile Raynaud, French theologian (d. 1663)
- November 17 – Archduke Maximilian Ernest of Austria, Austrian archduke (d. 1616)
- November 24 – Juan Martínez de Jáuregui y Aguilar, Spanish poet (d. 1641)
- December 25 – Orlando Gibbons, English composer (d. 1625)
- date unknown
  - Hendrick Jacobszoon Lucifer, Dutch pirate and buccaneer (d. 1627)
  - John Beaumont, English poet (d. 1627)
  - Bonaventura Elzevir, Dutch printer (d. 1652)
  - Stanisław Lubomirski, Polish nobleman (d. 1649)
  - Philip Massinger, English dramatist (d. 1640)
  - Hayashi Razan, Japanese neo-Confucianist scholar (d. 1657)
- probable
  - Alexander Henderson, Scottish theologian (d. 1646)
  - Nzinga, warrior sovereign queen of Ndongo and Matamba (d. 1663)
  - Aurelian Townshend, English poet (d. 1643)

1584

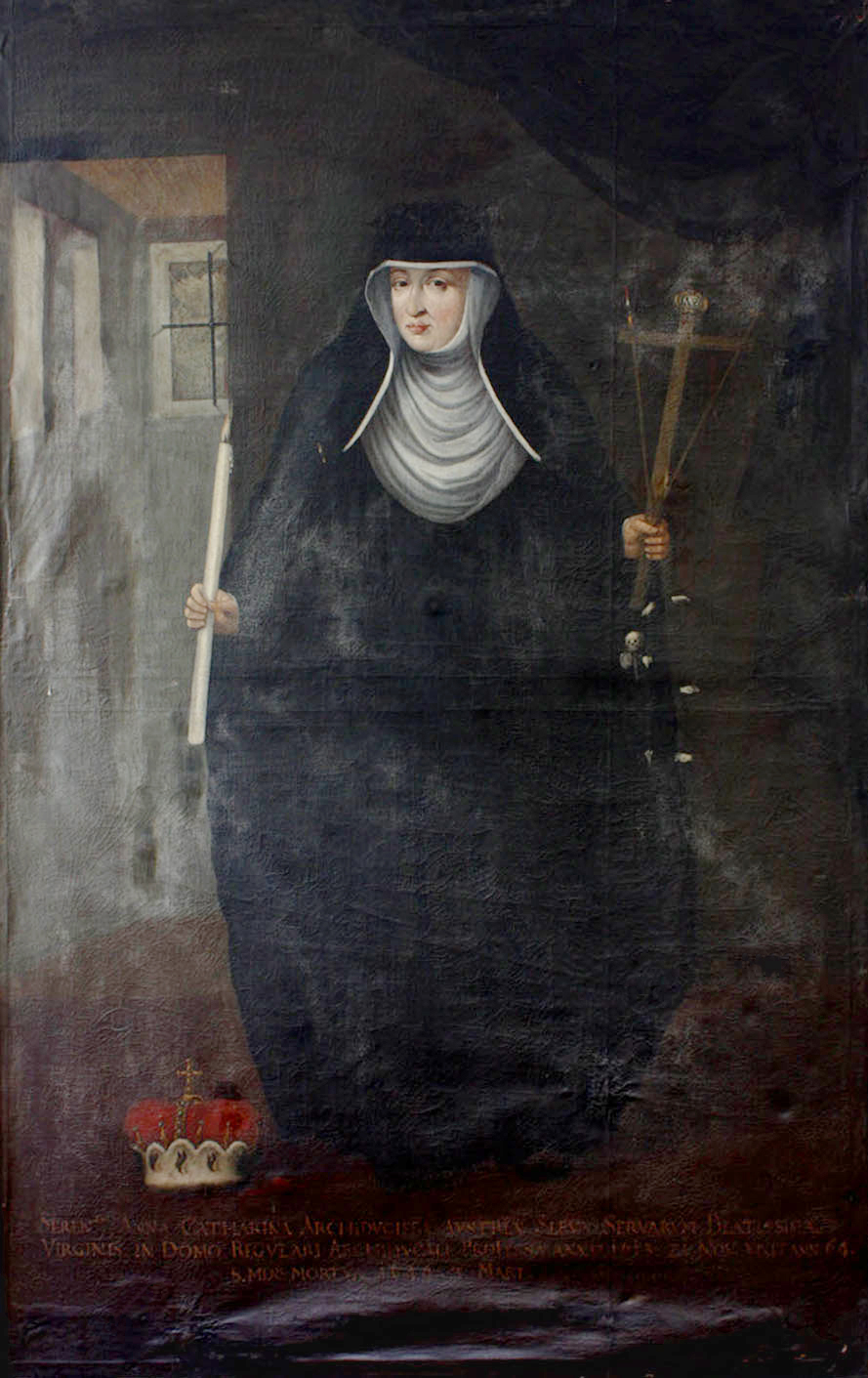
Archduchess Maria of Austria

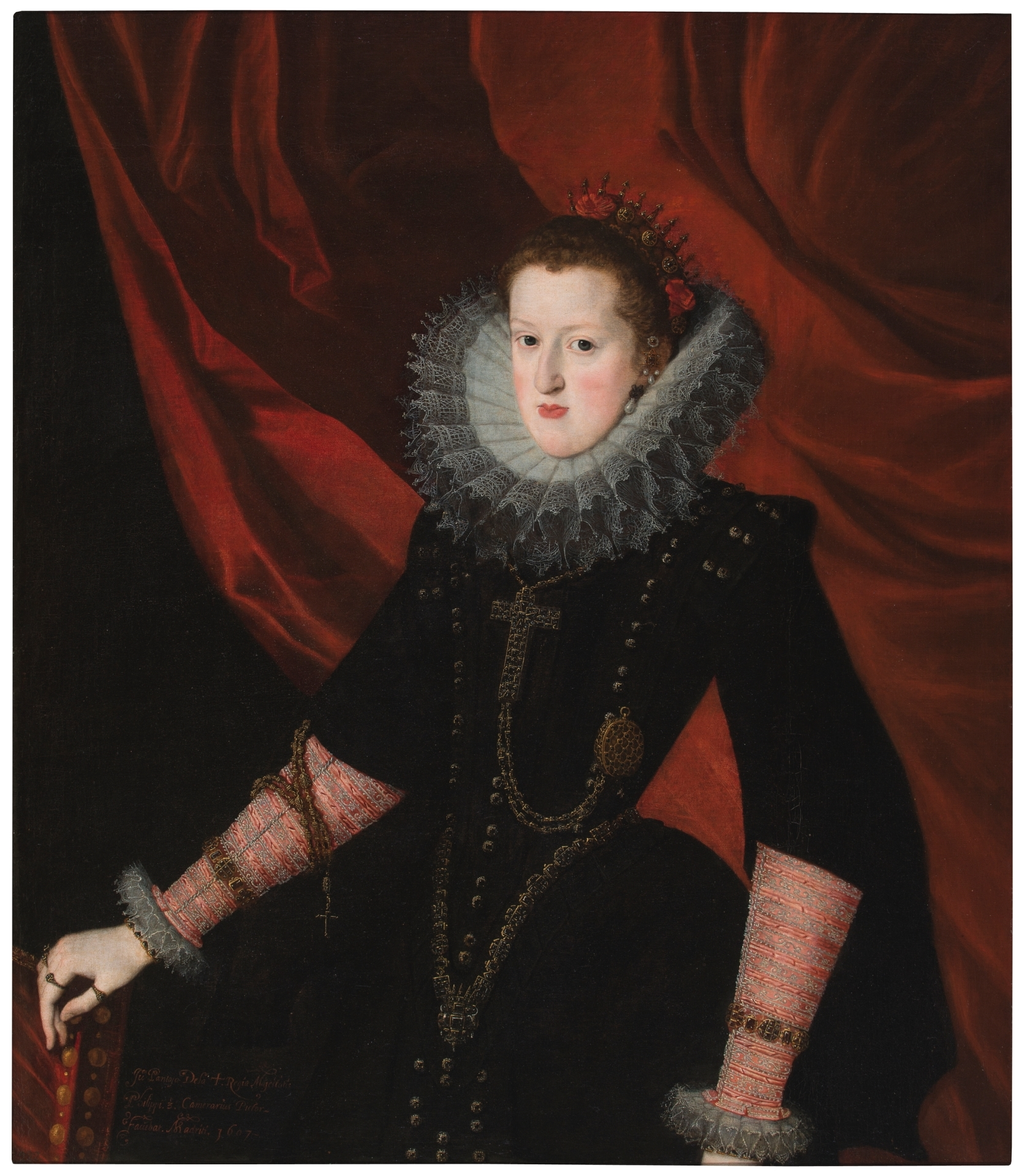
Margaret of Austria, Queen of Spain

- January 1 – Charles Delorme, French physician and the royal doctor for Kings Henri IV , Louis XIII and Louis XIV (d. 1678)
- January 7 – Karan Singh II, Maharana of Mewar (d. 1628)
- January 29 – Frederick Henry, Prince of Orange (d. 1647)
- February 9 – Francesco Maria Richini, Italian architect (d. 1658)
- February 12 – Caspar Barlaeus, Dutch polymath (d. 1648)
- February 18 – Philippe de Carteret II, governor of Jersey (d. 1643)
- February 19 – Angelo Nardi, Italian painter (d. 1664)
- February 26 – Albert VI of Bavaria (d. 1666)
- March 15 – Philip, Duke of Schleswig-Holstein-Sonderburg-Glücksburg (d. 1663)
- March 22 – Grégoire de Saint-Vincent, Flemish Jesuit mathematician (d. 1667)
- March 26 – John II, Count Palatine of Zweibrücken (d. 1635)
- March 29 – Ferdinando Fairfax, 2nd Lord Fairfax of Cameron, English parliamentary general (d. 1648)
- April 6 – Bridget de Vere, Countess of Berkshire, English noblewoman (d. 1630)
- April 10 – Sibylle Elisabeth of Württemberg, Duchess consort of Saxony (d. 1606)
- April 19 – John Hales, English theologian (d. 1656)
- April 20 – Sir John Langham, 1st Baronet, English Member of Parliament (d. 1671)
- April 23 – Jorge de Cárdenas y Manrique de Lara, Spanish noble (d. 1644)
- April 29 – Melchior Teschner, German cantor, composer and theologian (d. 1635)
- May 17 – John Jacob Hess, Swiss Anabaptist minister and martyr (d. 1639)
- May 23 – Maximilian von und zu Trauttmansdorff, Austrian diplomat (d. 1650)
- May 27 – Michael Altenburg, German composer (d. 1640)
- June 6 – Yuan Chonghuan, Chinese politician, military general and writer (d. 1630)
- June 15 – Anna Sophie of Anhalt, German noblewoman (d. 1652)
- June 16 – Archduchess Maria of Austria (d. 1649)
- June 25 – Richard Strode, English politician (d. 1669)
- June 26 – Robert Cholmondeley, 1st Earl of Leinster, English politician (d. 1659)
- July 17 – Agnes of Brandenburg, Duchess of Pomerania, later Duchess of Saxe-Lauenburg (d. 1629)
- July 26 – Gaspard III de Coligny, Marshal of France (d. 1646)
- August 1 – Emanuel Scrope, 1st Earl of Sunderland, English statesman (d. 1630)
- August 6 – Robert Pierrepont, 1st Earl of Kingston-upon-Hull, English soldier (d. 1643)
- August 10 – John Casimir, Count of Erbach-Breuberg (1606–1627) (d. 1627)
- August 11 – Philip Ernest, Count of Hohenlohe-Langenburg (1610–1628) (d. 1628)
- August 13 – Theophilus Howard, 2nd Earl of Suffolk, English politician (d. 1640)
- August 28 – Richard Treat, American city founder (d. 1669)
- August 29 – Patrick Young, Scottish librarian (d. 1652)
- September 11 – Thomas van Erpe, Dutch Orientialist, cartographer (d. 1624)
- September 13 – Francis Julius of Saxe-Lauenburg, Prince (d. 1634)
- September 15 – Georg Rudolf Weckherlin, German poet (d. 1653)
- September 16 – Giulio Roma, Italian Catholic cardinal (d. 1652)
- September 17 – John Finch, 1st Baron Finch, English judge (d. 1660)
- October 10 – Philip Herbert, 4th Earl of Pembroke (d. 1650)
- November 3 – Jean-Pierre Camus, French Catholic bishop (d. 1652)
- November 10 – Catherine of Sweden, Countess Palatine of Kleeburg (d. 1638)
- November 16 – Barbara Sophie of Brandenburg, duchess consort and later regent of Württemberg (d. 1636)
- November 18 – Gaspar de Crayer, Flemish painter (d. 1669)
- December 15 – Queen Inmok, Korean royal consort (d. 1632)
- December 16 – John Selden, English jurist (d. 1654)
- December 25 – Margaret of Austria, Queen of Spain (d. 1611)
- December 27 – Philipp Julius, Duke of Pomerania (d. 1625)
- December 28 – Juan de Dicastillo, Spanish theologian (d. 1653)
- date unknown
  - William Baffin, English explorer (d. 1622)
  - Francis Beaumont, English dramatist (d. 1616)
  - Antonio Cifra, Italian composer (d. 1629)
  - Hu Zhengyan, Chinese artist, printmaker, calligrapher and publisher (d. 1674)
  - Miyamoto Musashi, Japanese samurai, artist, strategist, rōnin and philosopher, known for The Book of Five Rings (written 1643) (d. 1645)
  - Mathieu Molé, French statesman (d. 1656)
  - Chiara Varotari, Italian Baroque painter (d. 1663)
  - Herman Wrangel, Swedish soldier and politician (d. 1643)

1585

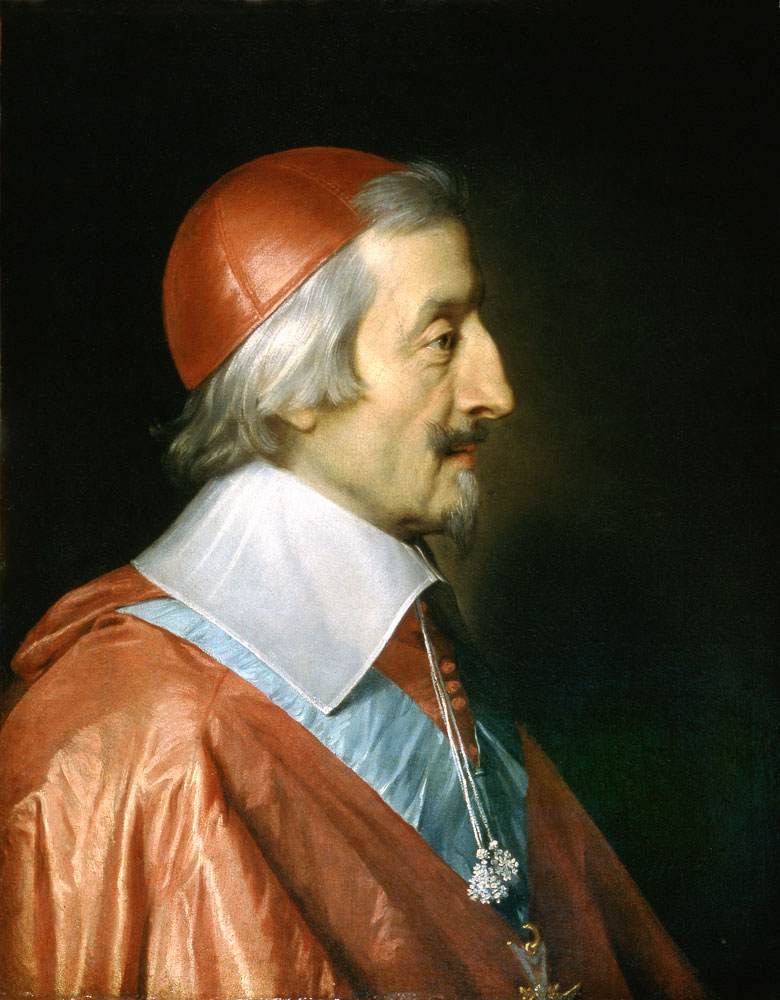
Cardinal Richelieu

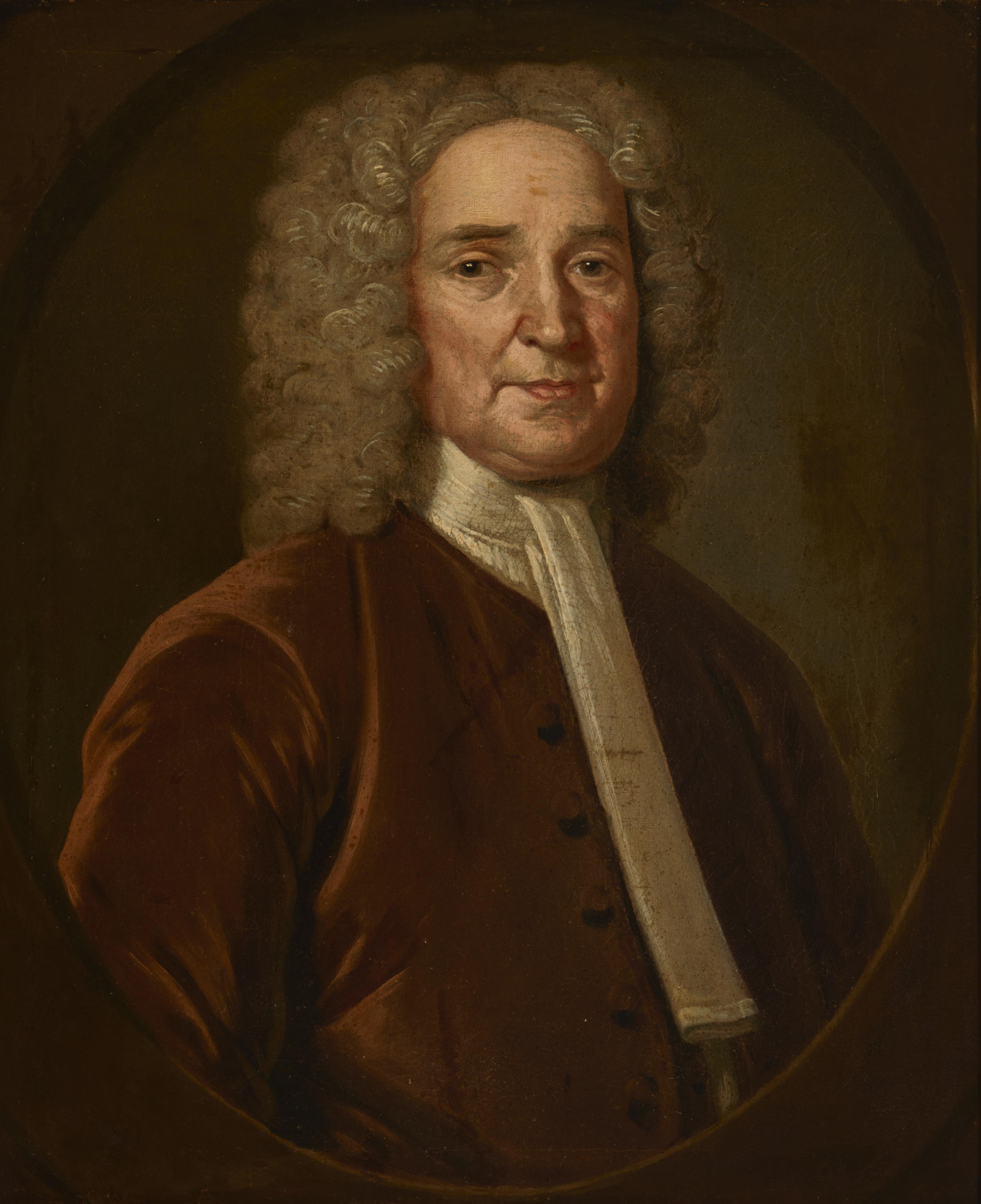
John Cotton

- January 5 – Carlo Emanuele Pio di Savoia, Italian Catholic cardinal (d. 1641)
- January 6 – Claude Favre de Vaugelas, Savoyard grammarian and man of letters (d. 1650)
- January 8 – Henriette Catherine de Joyeuse, Duchess of Joyeuse (d. 1656)
- January 9 – Sir Richard Grosvenor, 1st Baronet, English politician (d. 1645)
- January 23 – Mary Ward, English Catholic Religious Sister (d. 1645)
- January 24 – Anna Maria of Solms-Sonnewalde, Countess consort of Hohenlohe-Langenburg (d. 1634)
- January 27 – Hendrick Avercamp, Dutch painter (d. 1634)
- January 28 – Domenico II Contarini, Doge of Venice (d. 1675)
- January 31 – Daniel Schwenter, German Orientalist (d. 1636)
- February 2
  - Judith Quiney, William Shakespeare's youngest daughter (d. 1662)
  - Hamnet Shakespeare, William Shakespeare's only son (d. 1596)
- February 25 – Pieter van den Broecke, Dutch merchant (d. 1640)
- March 2 – John Macias, Spanish Dominican lay brother (d. 1645)
- March 5
  - Frederick I, Landgrave of Hesse-Homburg, founder of the junior line Hesse-Homburg (d. 1638)
  - John George I, Elector of Saxony (d. 1656)
- March 6 – Francesco Cornaro, Doge of Venice (d. 1656)
- March 16 – Gerbrand Adriaensz Bredero, Dutch writer (d. 1618)
- March 22 – Krzysztof Radziwiłł, Polish nobleman (d. 1640)
- April 6 – Marzio Ginetti, Italian Catholic cardinal (d. 1671)
- April 28 – George Goring, 1st Earl of Norwich, English soldier and politician (d. 1663)
- May 1 – Sophia Olelkovich Radziwill, Polish-Lithuanian noble (d. 1612)
- May 5 – Vincenzo Carafa, Italian Jesuit priest and spiritual writer (d. 1649)
- May 6 – Guy XX de Laval, French noble (d. 1605)
- May 12 – John Oglander, English politicians (d. 1655)
- June 11 – Evert Horn, Swedish soldier (d. 1615)
- June 13 – Antonio Ruiz de Montoya, Peruvian and Paraguayan linguist (d. 1652)
- June 24 – Johannes Lippius, German theologian, philosopher, composer and music theorist (d. 1612)
- July 2 – Jean Guiton, French Huguenot ship owner (d. 1654)
- July 11
  - Nicolaus Hunnius, German theologian (d. 1643)
  - Timothy Turner, British serjeant-at-law (d. 1677)
- July 26 – Dániel Esterházy, Hungarian noble (d. 1654)
- August 3 – Sir Thomas Burdett, 1st Baronet, of Bramcote, Sheriff of Derbyshire (d. 1647)
- August 5 – Jesper Brochmand, Danish bishop (d. 1652)
- August 25 – Giovanni Biliverti, Italian painter (d. 1644)
- August 26 – Peter Lauremberg, German writer and professor (d. 1639)
- September 9 – Armand Jean du Plessis, Cardinal Richelieu, French statesman and 4th Prime Minister of France (d. 1642)
- September 15 – Ottavio Vannini, Italian painter (d. 1640)
- September 26 – Antonio Franco, Italian Catholic bishop, prelate of Santa Lucia del Mela (d. 1626)
- September 27 – John Strangways, English politician (d. 1666)
- October 4 – Anna of Tyrol, Holy Roman Empress (d. 1618)
- October 8 – Heinrich Schütz, German composer (d. 1672)
- October 10 – Sir Edward Hussey, 1st Baronet, English politician (d. 1648)
- October 11 – Johann Heermann, German poet, hymn-writer (d. 1647)
- October 15 – Louis Cappel, French Protestant churchman and scholar (d. 1658)
- October 28 – Cornelius Jansen, French bishop of Ypres and religious reformer (d. 1638)
- October – John Ball, English puritan divine (d. 1640)
- November 1
  - Jan Brożek, Polish mathematician, physician and astronomer (d. 1652)
  - Adriaan Pauw (d. 1653)
- November 2 – Rudolf von Colloredo, Austrian field marshal (d. 1657)
- November 5 – Sir John St John, 1st Baronet, English baronet (d. 1648)
- November 26 – Herman op den Graeff, Dutch bishop (d. 1642)
- November 30 – Filippo Benedetto de Sio, Italian Catholic prelate, Bishop of Boiano (1641–1651) and Bishop of Caiazzo (1623–1641) (d. 1651)
- December 3 – Matthew Wren, influential English clergyman (d. 1667)
- December 4
  - John Cotton, clergyman in England and the American colonies, founder of Boston (d. 1652)
- December 13 – William Drummond of Hawthornden, Scottish poet (d. 1649)
- December 16 – Livia della Rovere, Italian noble (d. 1641)
- December 25 – Christian, Count of Waldeck-Wildungen (1588–1637) (d. 1637)
- December 31
  - Gonzalo Fernández de Córdoba, Spanish general (d. 1645)
  - Sumitomo Masatomo, Japanese businessman (d. 1652)
- date unknown
  - Zachary Boyd, Scottish religious writer (d. 1653)
  - Ambrose Barlow, Catholic priest and martyr (d. 1641)
  - Thomas Preston, 1st Viscount Tara, Irish soldier (d. 1655)
  - Lucilio Vanini, Italian free-thinker (d. 1619)
  - Alexander Whitaker, Virginia Colony religious leader (d. 1616)
  - Fang Weiyi, Chinese poet, calligrapher, painter and literature historian (d. 1668)

1586

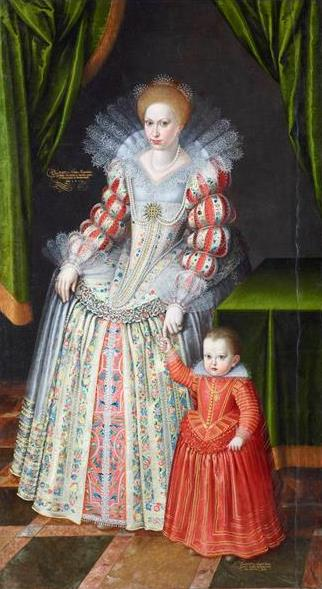
Duchess Magdalene Sibylle of Prussia

- January 1 – Pau Claris i Casademunt, Catalan ecclesiastic (d. 1641)
- January 20 – Johann Hermann Schein, German composer of the early Baroque era (d. 1630)
- January 29 – Louis Frederick, Duke of Württemberg-Montbéliard (1617–1631) (d. 1631)
- February 8 – Jacob Praetorius, German Baroque composer and organist (d. 1651)
- February 15 – Jacques de Bela, French writer (d. 1667)
- February 20 – Hachisuka Yoshishige, Japanese daimyō of the Edo period (d. 1620)
- February 24 – Matthias Faber, German Jesuit priest, writer (d. 1653)
- February 26 – Niccolò Cabeo, Italian Jesuit writer, theologian (d. 1657)
- March 12 – Jean Dolbeau, French missionary (d. 1652)
- March 28 – Domenico Massenzio, Italian baroque composer (d. 1657)
- March 29 – Ludwig Crocius, German Calvinist minister (d. 1653)
- April 2 – Pietro Della Valle, Italian composer (d. 1652)
- April 4 – Richard Saltonstall, English diplomat (d. 1661)
- April 5 – Christopher Levett, English explorer (d. 1630)
- April 9 – Julius Henry, Duke of Saxe-Lauenburg (d. 1665)
- April 12 (bapt.) – John Ford, English dramatist and poet (d. c. 1639)
- April 20 – Saint Rose of Lima, Spanish colonist in Lima (d. 1617)
- April 23 – Martin Rinkart, German clergyman and hymnist (d. 1649)
- April 24 – Henry Hastings, 5th Earl of Huntingdon, English noble (d. 1643)
- May 2 – Étienne de Courcelles, French scholar (d. 1659)
- May 7 – Francesco IV Gonzaga, Duke of Mantua and Montferrat (d. 1612)
- May 9 – Tsugaru Nobuhira, Japanese daimyō (d. 1631)
- May 11 – Angelo Giori, Italian Catholic cardinal (d. 1662)
- May 23 – Paul Siefert, German composer and organist (d. 1666)
- June 24 – George John II, Count Palatine of Lützelstein-Guttenberg, German noble (d. 1654)
- July 1 – Claudio Saracini, Italian composer (d. 1630)
- July 5 – Thomas Hooker, prominent Puritan colonial leader (d. 1647)
- July 6 – Thomas Trevor, English politician and judge (d. 1656)
- July 7 – Thomas Howard, 21st Earl of Arundel, English courtier (d. 1646)
- July 26 – Diego de Colmenares, Spanish historian (d. 1651)
- August 14 – William Hutchinson, founder of Rhode Island (d. 1642)
- August 17 – Johann Valentin Andrea, German theologian (d. 1654)
- September 15 – Antoon Sanders, Dutch priest, historian (d. 1664)
- September 29 – William Lytton, English Member of Parliament (d. 1660)
- October 7 – Isaac Massa, Dutch diplomat (d. 1643)
- October 9 – Leopold V, Archduke of Austria, regent of Tyrol (d. 1632)
- October 20 – Luke Foxe, English explorer (d. 1635)
- October 28 – Francis West, Deputy Governor of the Colony and Dominion of Virginia (d. 1634)
- November 20 – Polykarp Leyser II, German theologian (d. 1633)
- November 22 – Walter Erle, English politician (d. 1665)
- November 23 – Juan Bautista de Lezana, Spanish theologian (d. 1659)
- November 27 – Sir John Wray, 2nd Baronet, English politician (d. 1655)
- November 28 – Sir Thomas Bowyer, 1st Baronet, English politician (d. 1650)
- December 6 – Niccolò Zucchi, Italian astronomer and physicist (d. 1670)
- December 14 – Georg Calixtus, German Lutheran theologian who looked to reconcile all Christendom (d. 1656)
- December 31 – Duchess Magdalene Sibylle of Prussia, Electress of Saxony (d. 1659)
- date unknown – John Mason, English explorer (d. 1635)
- date unknown – Kocc Barma Fall, Senegambian philosopher (d. 1655)
- probable
  - Giles Fletcher, English poet (d. 1623)
  - David HaLevi Segal, Polish Jewish rabbi (d. 1667)

1587

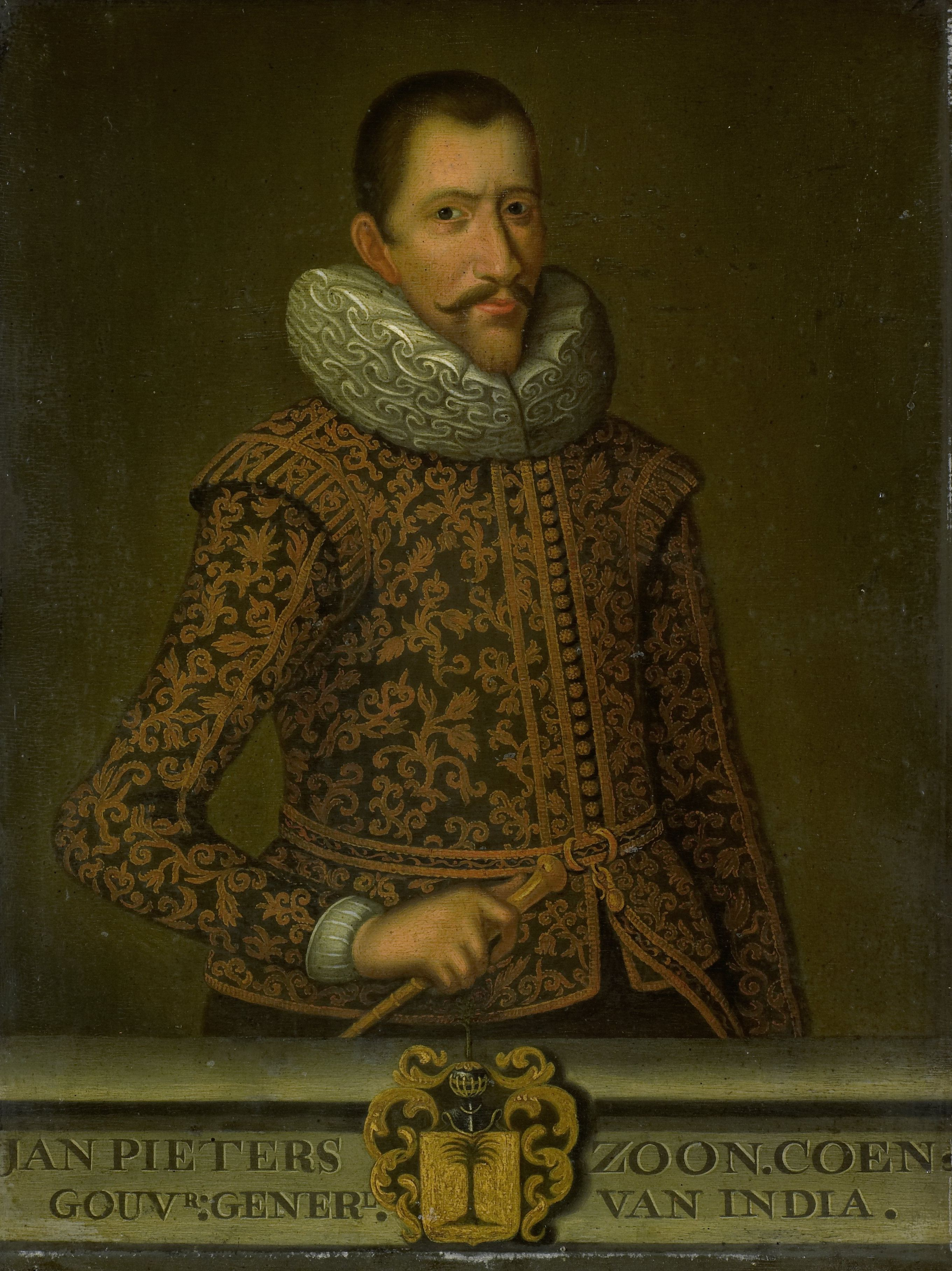
Jan Pieterszoon Coen

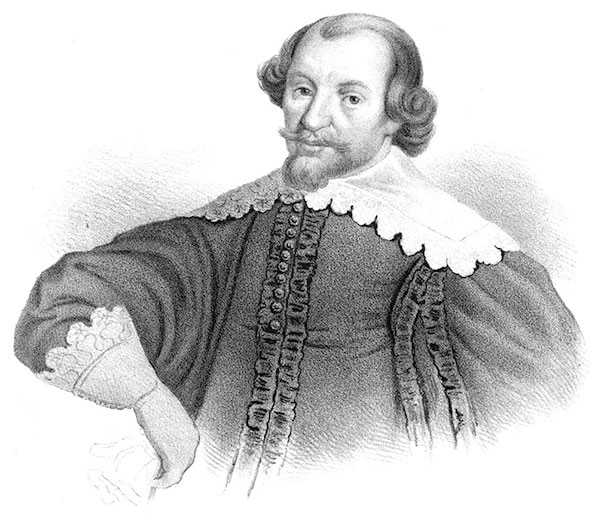
Gabriel Gustafsson Oxenstierna

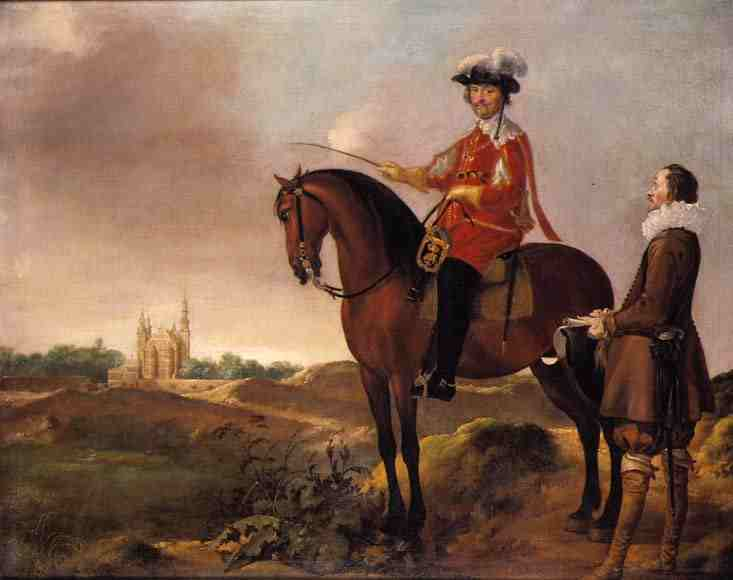
Hans van Steenwinckel the Younger

- January 2 – Anders Arrebo, Danish writer (d. 1637)
- January 5 – Xu Xiake, Chinese adventurer and geographer (d. 1641)
- January 6 – Gaspar de Guzmán, Count-Duke of Olivares, Spanish politician (d. 1645)
- January 8
  - Jan Pieterszoon Coen, Governor-General of the Dutch East Indies (d. 1629)
  - Johannes Fabricius, Frisian/German astronomer (d. 1616)
- January 12 – John Winthrop, English Puritan lawyer (d. 1649)
- February 1 – Pál Esterházy, Hungarian noble (d. 1645)
- February 3 – Dorothea Hedwig of Brunswick-Wolfenbüttel, Princess of Anhalt-Zerbst (d. 1609)
- February 20 – Emanuel Sueyro, Dutch historian, translator, spymaster (d. 1629)
- February 26 – Stefano Landi, Italian composer (d. 1639)
- March 17 – David Lindsay, 1st Lord Balcarres, Scottish politician and noble (d. 1642)
- April 1 – Sir John Mill, 1st Baronet, English politician (d. 1648)
- April 2 – Virginia Centurione Bracelli, Italian saint (d. 1651)
- April 18 – Sir Charles Morrison, 1st Baronet, Member of the Parliament of England (d. 1628)
- April 26
  - Ferdinando Gonzaga, Duke of Mantua, Italian Catholic cardinal (d. 1626)
  - Abraham van der Haagen, Dutch painter (d. 1639)
- April 28 – Krzysztof Ossoliński, Polish nobleman (d. 1645)
- April 29 – Sophie of Saxony, Duchess of Pomerania (d. 1635)
- April 30 – Éléonore de Bourbon, Dutch princess (d. 1619)
- May 7 – Richard Newport, 1st Baron Newport, English politician (d. 1651)
- May 8 – Victor Amadeus I, Duke of Savoy (d. 1637)
- May 17 – Esaias van de Velde, Dutch painter (d. 1630)
- May – Esaias van de Velde, Dutch landscape painter (died 1630)
- May 26 – Susan de Vere, Countess of Montgomery, English noblewoman (d. 1628)
- June 2 – Willem Bontekoe, skipper in the Dutch East India Company (d. 1657)
- June 5 – Robert Rich, 2nd Earl of Warwick, English colonial administrator and admiral (d. 1658)
- June 11 – Sir Thomas Jervoise, English politician (d. 1654)
- June 15 – Gabriel Gustafsson Oxenstierna, Swedish statesman (d. 1640)
- June 21 – Kaspar von Barth, German philologist and writer (d. 1658)
- June 24
  - William Arnold, American settler (d. 1676)
  - Hans van Steenwinckel the Younger, Danish architect (d. 1639)
- July 4 – Magdalene of Bavaria, Consort of Wolfgang William, Count Palatine of Neuburg (d. 1628)
- August 16 – Khusrau Mirza, Mughal prince (d. 1622)
- August 18 – Virginia Dare, Virginia colony settler
- August 23 – Johann Friedrich, Count Palatine of Sulzbach-Hilpoltstein (1614–1644) (d. 1644)
- August 28 – Christian William of Brandenburg, administrator of bishoprics of Magdeburg and Halberstadt (d. 1665)
- September 1 – Gómez Suárez de Figueroa, 3rd Duke of Feria, Spanish general (d. 1634)
- September 3 – Countess Juliane of Nassau-Siegen, Landgravine of Hesse-kassel (d. 1643)
- September 18 – Francesca Caccini, Italian composer
- September 19
  - Robert Sanderson, English theologian and casuist (d. 1663)
  - Mu Zeng, Chinese politician (d. 1646)
- October 8 – Thomas Howard, 1st Earl of Berkshire, English politician (d. 1669)
- October 17 – Nathan Field, English dramatist and actor (d. 1620)
- October 18 – Philippe-Charles, 3rd Count of Arenberg (d. 1640)
- October 19 – Thomas Dacres, English politician (d. 1668)
- October 22 – Joachim Jungius, German mathematician and philosopher (d. 1657)
- October 23 – Sir Gilbert Gerard, 1st Baronet of Harrow on the Hill, English politician (d. 1670)
- November 3 – Samuel Scheidt, German composer (d. 1653)
- November 17
  - Charles Lallemant, French Jesuit (d. 1674)
  - Joost van den Vondel, Dutch dramatist and poet (d. 1679)
- November 25 – Sir Gervase Clifton, 1st Baronet, English politician (d. 1666)
- December 13 – Emmanuel Stupanus, Swiss physician (d. 1664)
- December 19 – Dorothea Sophia, Abbess of Quedlinburg Abbey (1618–1645) (d. 1645)
- December 30 – Simon VII, Count of Lippe-Detmold (1613–1627) (d. 1627)
- date unknown
  - William Feilding, 1st Earl of Denbigh (d. 1643)
  - Francis Kynaston, English courtier and poet (d. 1642)
  - Yun Seondo, Korean politician and poet (d. 1671)
  - Song Yingxing, Chinese encyclopedist (d. 1666)
  - George Yeardley, English colonial administrator in America (d. 1627)

1588

Pierre Seguier

- January 4 – Arnold Vinnius, Dutch lawyer (d. 1657)
- January 6 – Elizabeth Stanley, Countess of Huntingdon, English noblewoman and writer (d. 1633)
- January 20 – Francesco Gessi, Italian painter (d. 1649)
- February 2 – Georg II of Fleckenstein-Dagstuhl, German nobleman (d. 1644)
- February 15 – Benjamin Bramer, German mathematician (d. 1652)
- March 12 – Herman de Neyt, Flemish painter (d. 1642)
- March 21 – Egon VIII of Fürstenberg-Heiligenberg, Bavarian count and field-marshal (d. 1635)
- March 22 – Frederick IX, Margrave of Brandenburg, Grand Master of the Order of Saint John (d. 1611)
- March 27 – Celestyn Myślenta, Polish theologian (d. 1653)
- March 29 – Margherita Aldobrandini, Parmesan regent (d. 1646)
- March – Johann Heinrich Alsted, German theologian (d. 1638)
- April 4 – Padovanino, Italian painter (d. 1649)
- April 5 – Thomas Hobbes, English philosopher (d. 1679)
- April 15 – Claudius Salmasius, French classical scholar (d. 1653)
- April 16 – Emanuel Filibert of Savoy, Viceroy of Sicily (d. 1624)
- May 2 – Étienne Pascal, French mathematician (d. 1651)
- May 9 – Herman Hugo, Jesuit priest, writer, military chaplain (d. 1629)
- May 13 – Ole Worm, Danish physician and antiquary (d. 1654)
- May 28 – Pierre Séguier, Chancellor of France (d. 1672)
- June 3 – Julius Frederick, Duke of Württemberg-Weiltingen (1617–16135) (d. 1635)
- June 9 – Johann Andreas Herbst, German composer and music theorist (d. 1666)
- June 11 – George Wither, English poet and satirist (d. 1667)
- June 14 – Hoshina Masasada, Japanese daimyō who ruled the Ino Domain (d. 1661)
- June 30 – Giovanni Maria Sabino, Italian composer, organist and teacher (d. 1649)

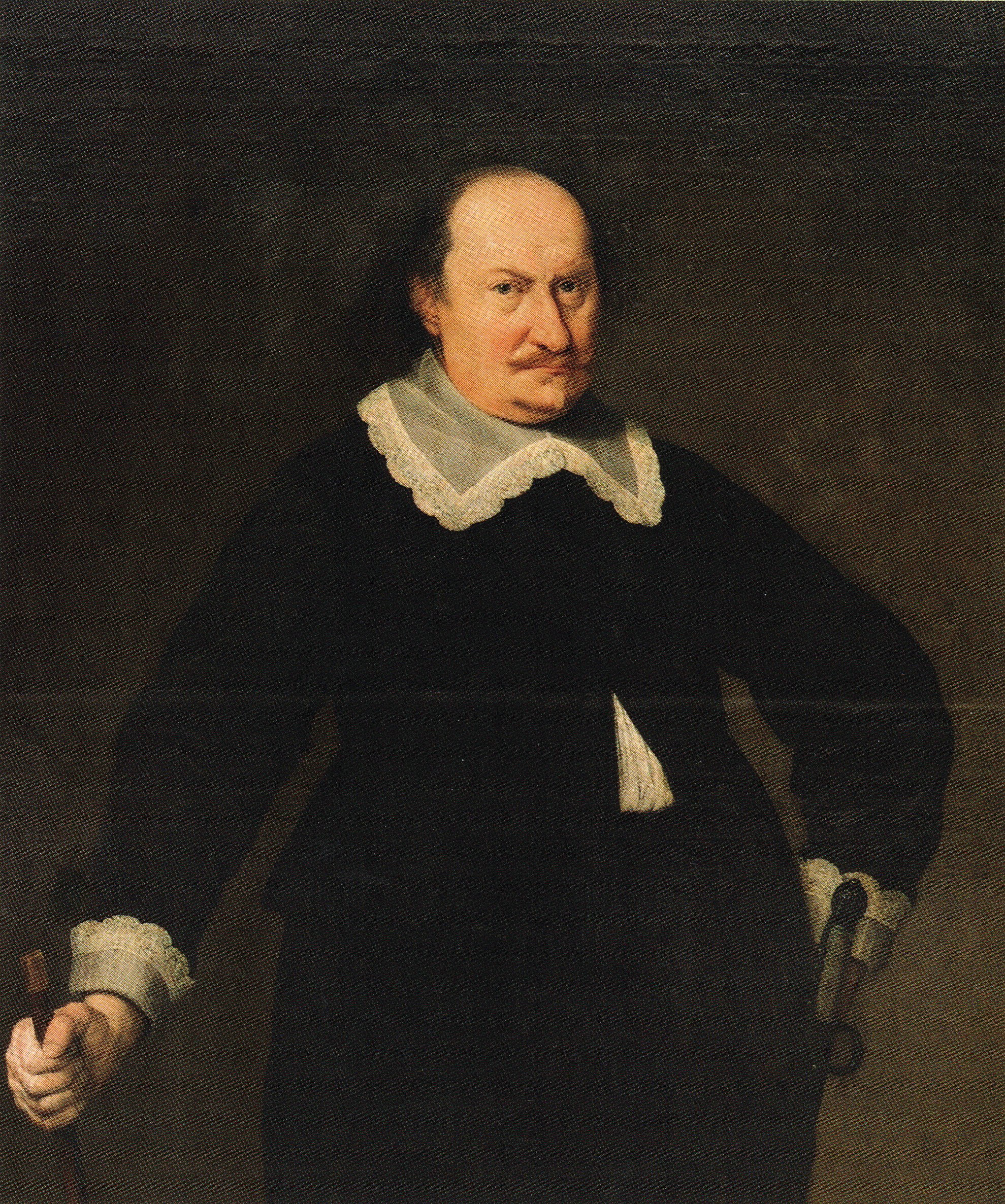
Adolf Frederick I, Duke of Mecklenburg

- July 7 – Wolrad IV, Count of Waldeck-Eisenberg (1588–1640) (d. 1640)
- July 29 – William Spring of Pakenham, Member of Parliament (d. 1638)
- August 25 – Elizabeth Poole, English settler in Plymouth Colony (d. 1654)
- August – François de La Mothe Le Vayer, French writer (d. 1672)
- September 1 – Henri, Prince of Condé (d. 1646)
- September 8 – Marin Mersenne, French theologian (d. 1648)
- September 10 – Nicholas Lanier, English composer (d. 1666)
- September 13 – Edward Vaux, 4th Baron Vaux of Harrowden, English baron (d. 1661)
- October 7 – Sir Drue Drury, 1st Baronet, English politician (d. 1632)
- October 16 – Luke Wadding, Irish Franciscan friar and historian (d. 1657)
- October 17 – Matthias Gallas, Austrian soldier (d. 1647)
- November 25 – Gilbert Ironside the elder, English bishop (d. 1671)
- December 10
  - Johann von Aldringen, Austrian field marshal (d. 1634)
  - Isaac Beeckman, Dutch philosopher and scientist (d. 1637)
- December 15
  - Charles de Condren, French theologian (d. 1641)
  - Adolf Frederick I, Duke of Mecklenburg-Schwerin (1592–1628 and again 1631–1658) (d. 1658)
- December 23 – Claude Bernard, French priest (d. 1641)
- December 24 – Constance of Austria, Queen of Poland (d. 1631)
- John Danvers, English politician (d. 1655)
- John Endecott, English politician (d. 1665)
- Robert Filmer, English political writer (d. 1653)
- Accepted Frewen, English churchman (d. 1664)
- Madame Ke, influential nanny of the Tianqi Emperor of China (approximately; d. 1627)
- Francis Higginson, colonial American Puritan (d. 1630)
- Jan Janssonius, Dutch cartographer (d. 1664)
- Catherine de Vivonne, marquise de Rambouillet (d. 1665)
- John Winthrop, influential Puritan in the history of Massachusetts (d. 1649)

1589

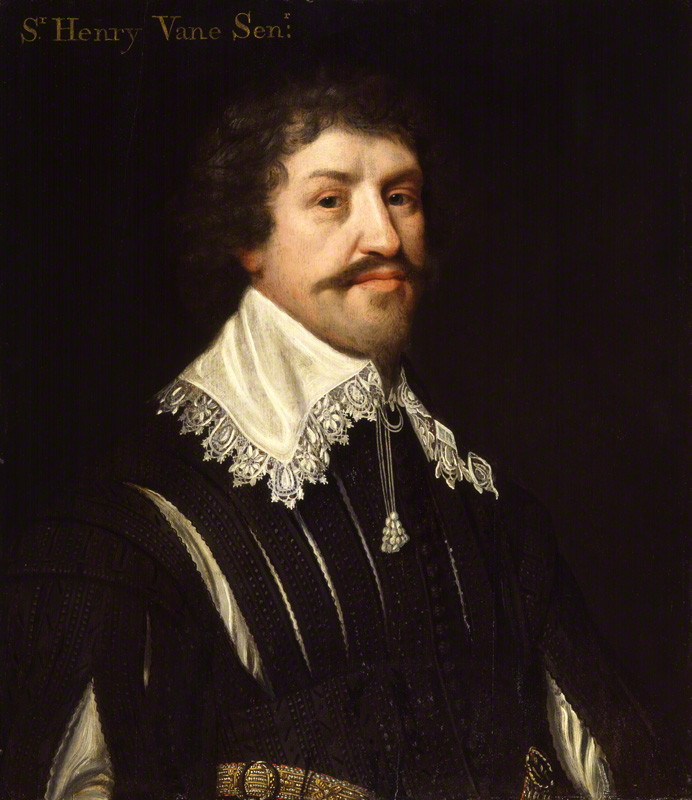
Henry Vane the Elder

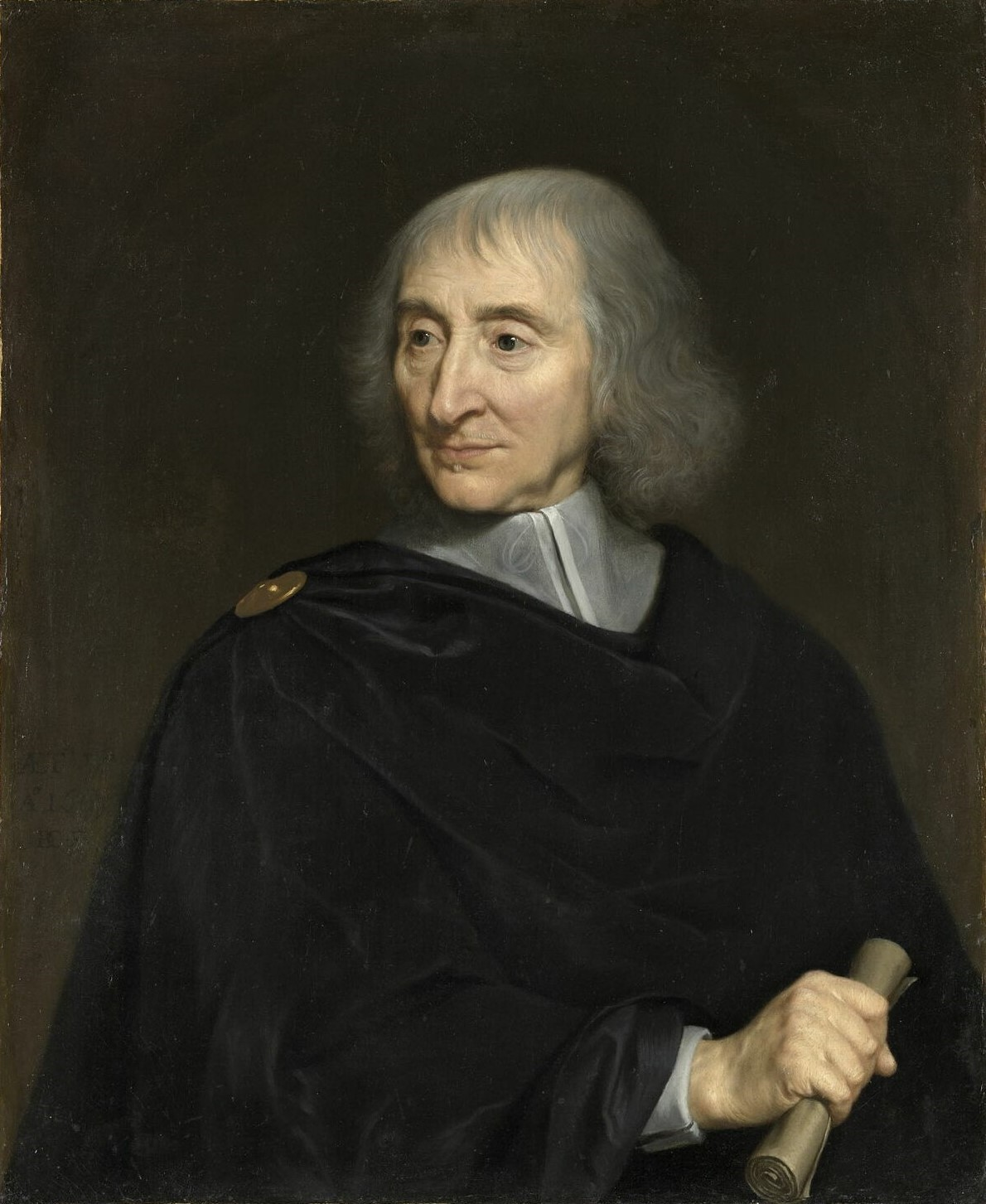
Robert Arnauld d'Andilly

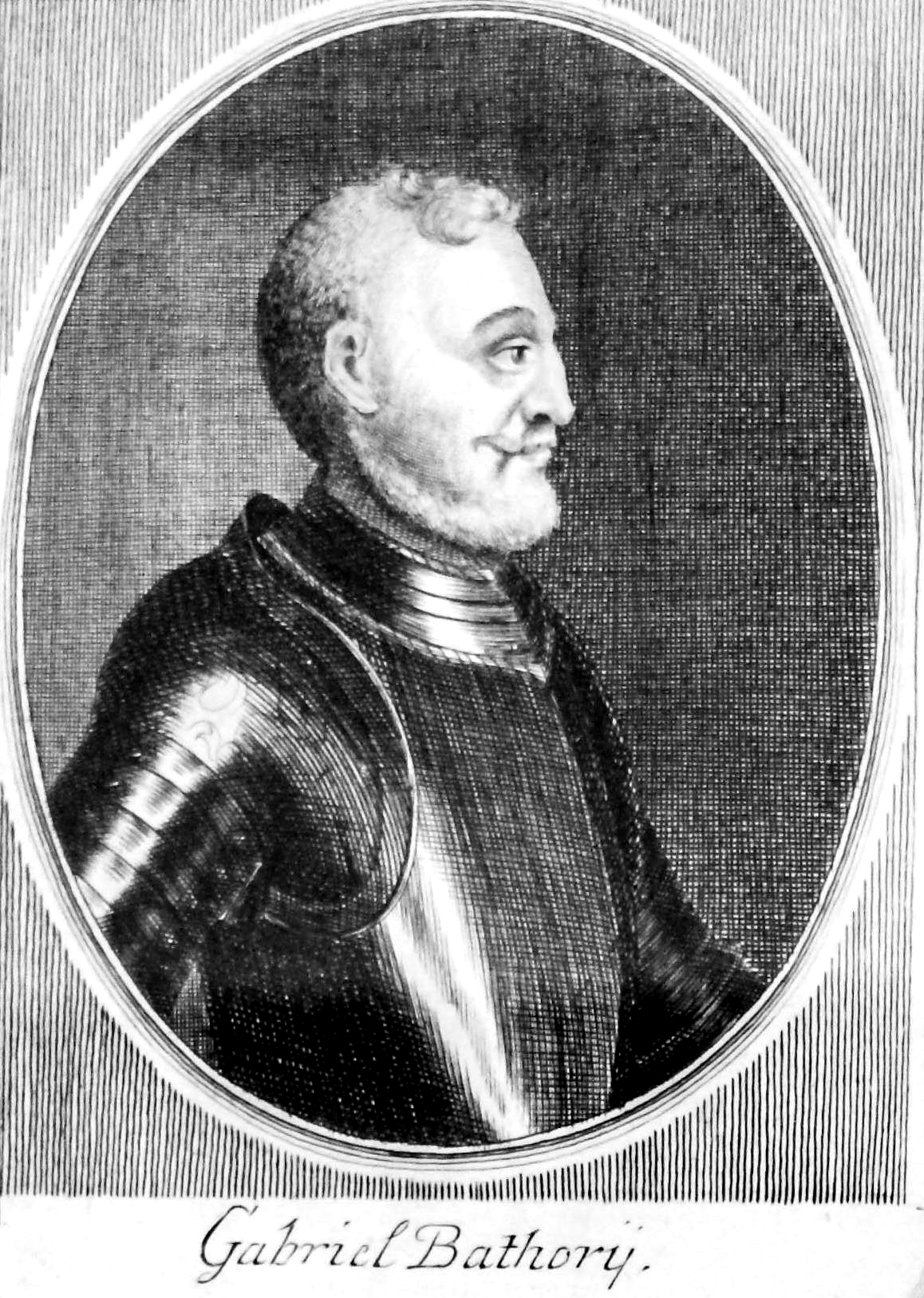
Gabriel Báthory

- January 8 – Ivan Gundulić, Croatian poet (d. 1638)
- January 11 – William Strode, English politician (d. 1666)
- January 28 – Francisco Ximénez de Urrea, Spanish historian (d. 1647)
- February 5
  - Honorat de Bueil, seigneur de Racan (d. 1670)
  - Esteban Manuel de Villegas, Spanish poet (d. 1669)
- February 7 – Jacob de Witt, Mayor of Dordrecht (d. 1674)
- February 8 – Peter Melander Graf von Holzappel, Protestant military leader in the Thirty Years' War (d. 1648)
- February 18
  - Henry Vane the Elder, English politician (d. 1655)
  - Maarten Gerritsz Vries, Dutch explorer (d. 1646)
- March 1 – Thomas Middleton, English politician (d. 1662)
- March 3 – Gisbertus Voetius, Dutch theologian (d. 1676)
- March 18 – Richard Sackville, 3rd Earl of Dorset, English noble (d. 1624)
- April 16 – Nicolaes le Febure, Dutch Golden Age member of the Haarlem schutterij (d. 1641)
- April 17 – Martin Zeiler, German author (d. 1661)
- April 18 – John, Duke of Östergötland, Swedish prince (d. 1618)
- April 20 – John Casimir, Count Palatine of Kleeburg, son of John I (d. 1652)
- April 28 – Margaret of Savoy, Vicereine of Portugal (d. 1655)
- May 12 – François L’Anglois, French artist (d. 1647)
- May 28 – Robert Arnauld d'Andilly, French writer (d. 1674)
- June 9 – John of St. Thomas, Portuguese philosopher (d. 1644)
- June 16 – Albrycht Władysław Radziwiłł, Polish prince (d. 1636)
- June 20 – Giambattista Altieri, Italian Catholic cardinal (d. 1654)
- July 2 – Richard Pepys, English politician (d. 1659)
- July 3 – Johann Georg Wirsung, German anatomist (d. 1643)
- July 15 – Cornelis Bol, Flemish painter and etcher (d. 1666)
- July 16 – Sinibaldo Scorza, Italian painter (d. 1631)
- August 1 – Alexandrine von Taxis, German Imperial General Post Master (d. 1666)
- August 8 – Framlingham Gawdy, English politician (d. 1654)
- August 12
  - Domenico Fiasella, Italian painter (d. 1669)
  - Ulrich, Duke of Pomerania, Bishop of Cammin (d. 1622)
- August 15 – Gabriel Báthory, Prince of Transylvania (d. 1613)
- September 1 – Giovanni Pesaro, Doge of Venice (d. 1659)
- September 7 – August of Saxony, German prince (d. 1615)
- September 17 – Agostinho Barbosa, Portuguese bishop in Italy and writer on canon law (d. 1649)
- October 7 – Maria Magdalena of Austria (d. 1631)
- October 8 – Pedro de Villagómez Vivanco, Roman Catholic prelate, Archbishop of Lima, then Bishop of Arequipa (d. 1671)
- October 24 – Giuseppe Marcinò, Italian priest, member of the Order of Friars Minor - or Capuchins (d. 1655)
- October 25 – Jan Stanisław Sapieha, Grand Hetman of Lithuania (d. 1635)
- October 31 – Muhammad Parviz, Mughal emperor (d. 1626)
- December 21 – Otto, Count of Lippe-Brake (1621–1657) (d. 1657)
- Tsar Feodor II of Russia (d. 1605)
- Yönten Gyatso, 4th Dalai Lama
- John Bankes, Attorney General and Chief Justice to King Charles I of England (d. 1644)
- Jusepa Vaca, Spanish stage actress (d. 1653)

== Deaths ==
1580

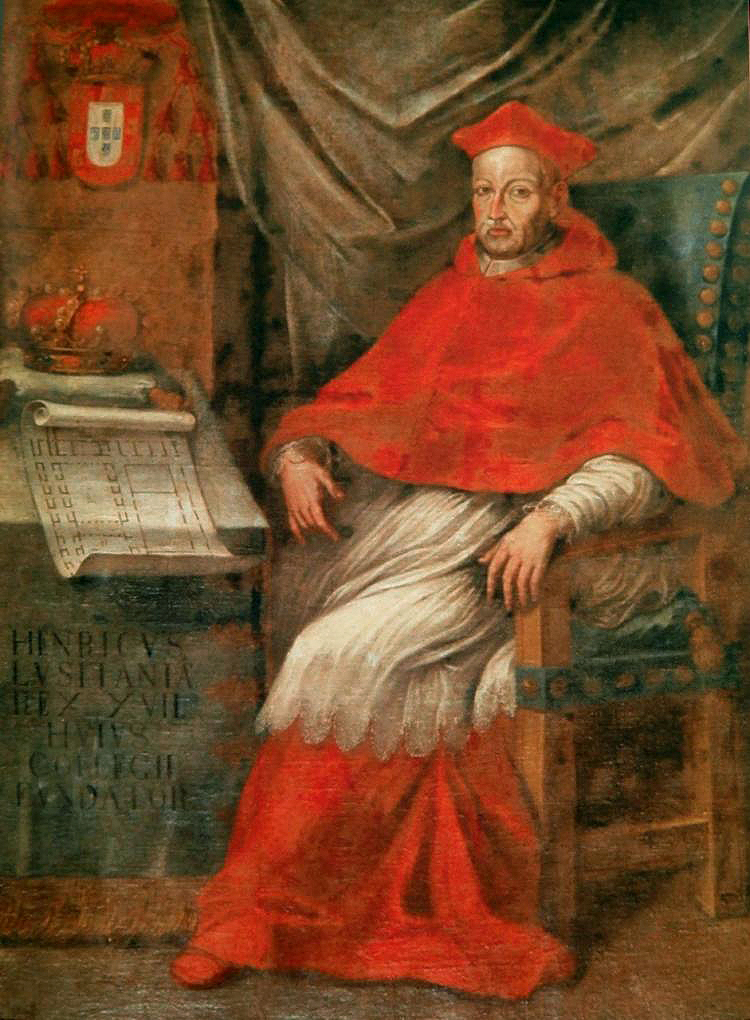
Henry, King of Portugal

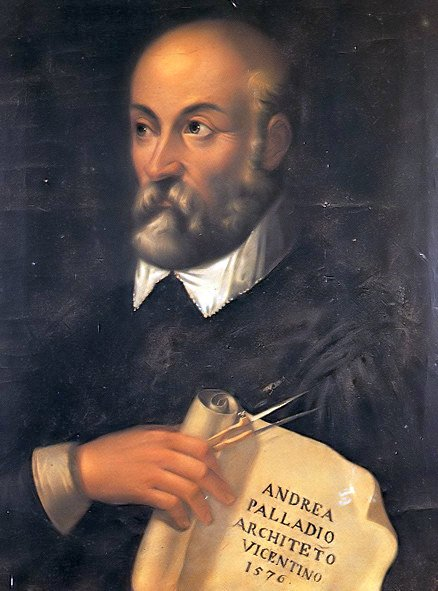
Andrea Palladio

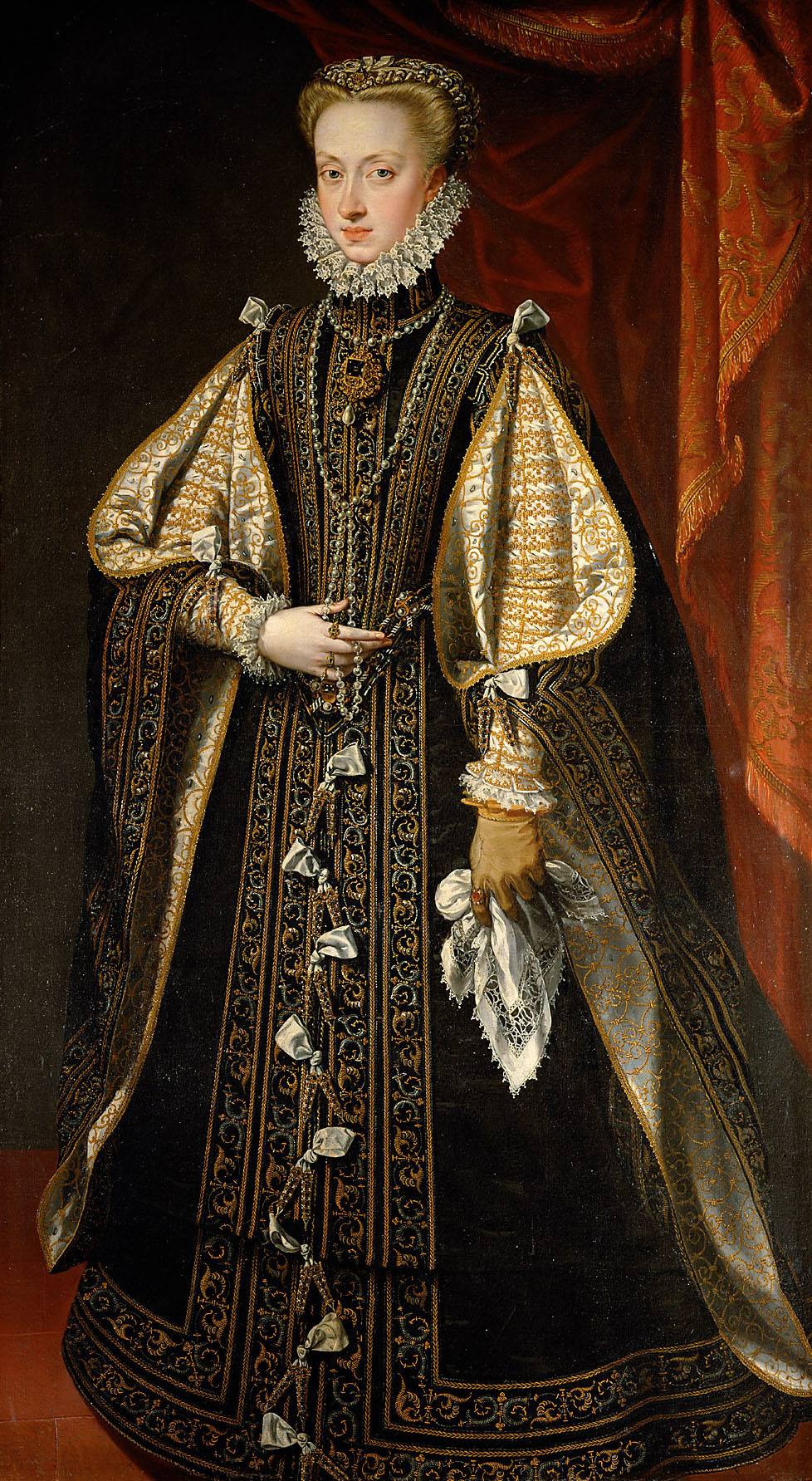
Anna of Austria

- January 5 – Anna Sibylle of Hanau-Lichtenberg, German noblewoman (b. 1542)
- January 18
  - Antonio Scandello, Italian composer (b. 1517)
  - Archangelo de' Bianchi, Italian Catholic cardinal (b. 1516)
- January 31 – King Henry of Portugal (b. 1512)
- February 2 – Bessho Nagaharu, Japanese retainer (b. 1558)
- February 24 – Henry FitzAlan, 19th Earl of Arundel, English nobleman (b. 1511)
- April 20 – Francesco Alciati, Italian Catholic cardinal (b. 1522)
- May 3 – Thomas Tusser, English poet and farmer (b. c. 1524)
- May 31 – Dorothea of Denmark, Electress Palatine, Princess of Denmark, Sweden and Norway (b. 1520)
- June 10 – Luís de Camões, Portuguese poet (b. c. 1524)
- June 18 – Juliana of Stolberg, German countess (b. 1506)
- August 1 – Albrecht Giese, German politician and diplomat (b. 1524)
- August 12 – Luca Longhi, Italian painter (b. 1507)
- August 15 – Vincenzo Borghini, Italian monk (b. 1515)
- August 19 – Andrea Palladio, Italian architect (b. 1508)
- August 20 – Jerónimo Osório, Portuguese historian (b. 1506)
- August 28 – Antonín Brus of Mohelnice, Moravian Catholic archbishop (b. 1518)
- August 30 – Emmanuel Philibert, Duke of Savoy (b. 1528)
- September 19 – Catherine Brandon, Duchess of Suffolk, English noblewoman (b. 1519)
- September 20 – Honorat II of Savoy, French Navy admiral (b. 1511)
- September – Anne de Pisseleu d'Heilly, French royal mistress and cultural patron (b. 1508)
- October 1 – John II, Duke of Schleswig-Holstein-Haderslev (b. 1521)
- October 5 – Matsudaira Shigeyoshi, Japanese general (b. 1493)
- October 8 – Hieronymus Wolf, German historian (b. 1516)
- October 26 – Anna of Austria, Queen of Spain (b. 1549)
- November 3 – Jerónimo Zurita y Castro, Spanish historian (b. 1512)
- November 16 – Marie of Baden-Sponheim, German noblewoman (b. 1507
- November 30 – Richard Farrant, English composer (b. 1530)
- December 1 – Giovanni Morone, Italian Catholic cardinal (b. 1509)
- date unknown
  - Giovanni Filippo Ingrassia, Italian anatomist (b. 1545)
  - Ruy López de Segura, Spanish priest and writer on chess (b. 1530)
  - Inés de Suárez, Spanish conquistadora (b. 1507)
  - Lucrezia Galletta, Italian courtesan and banker
- possible date
  - John Heywood, English dramatist (b. 1497)
  - Robert Lindsay of Pitscottie, Scottish chronicler (b. c. 1532)

1581

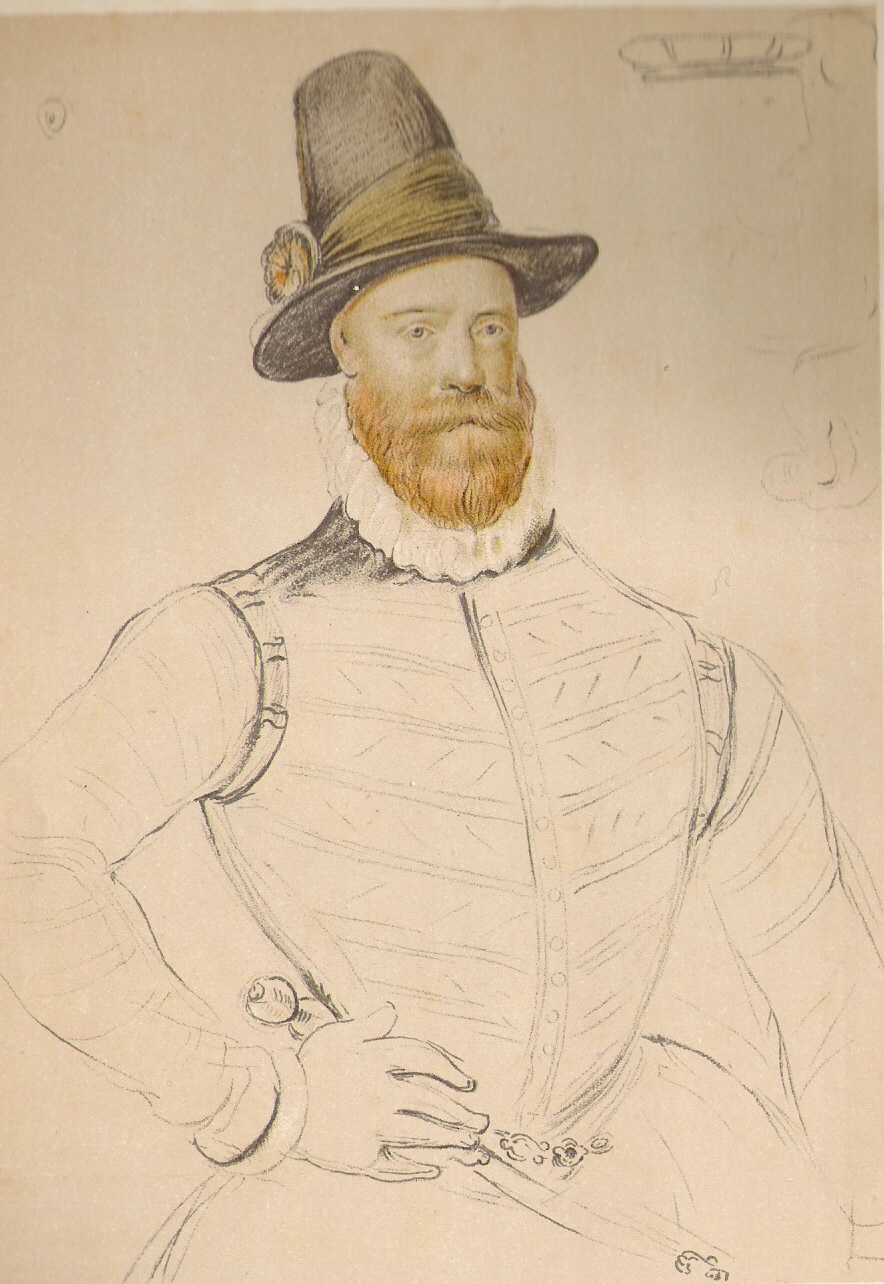
James Douglas

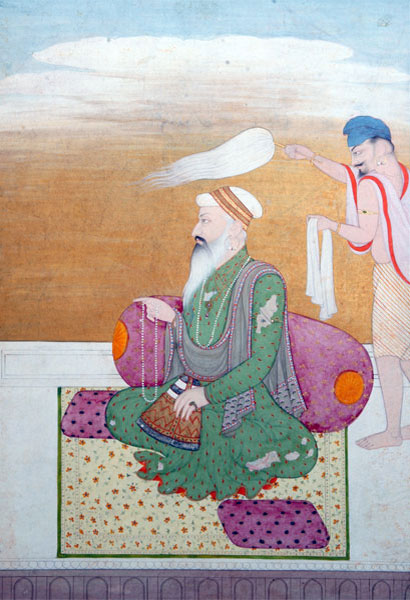
Guru Ram Das

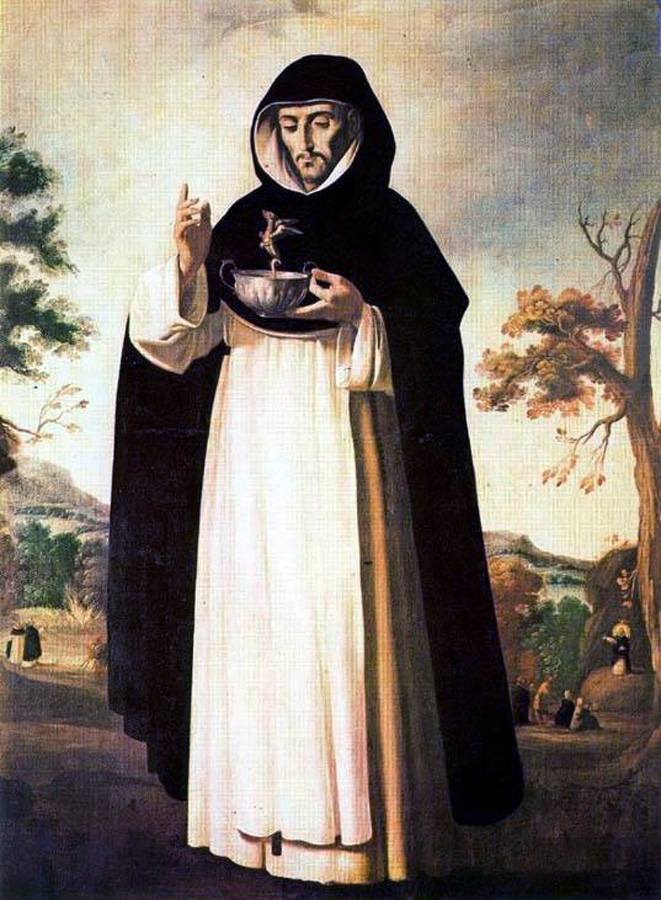
Saint Louis Bertrand

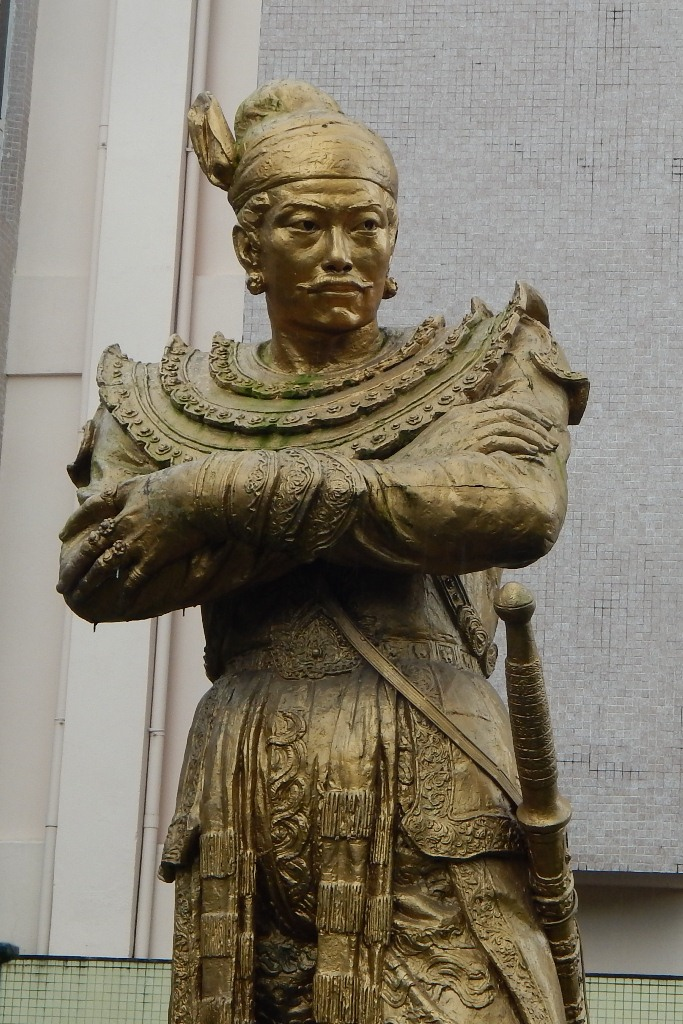
King Bayinnaung

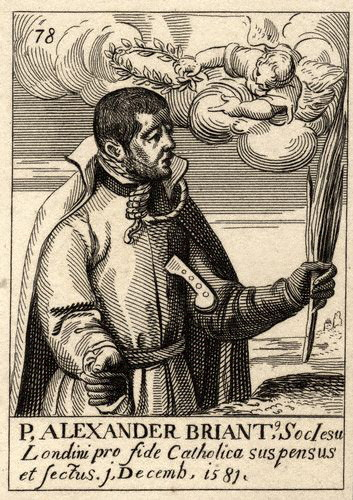
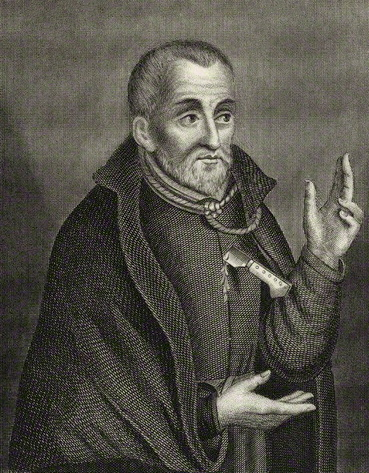
Saints Alexander Briant and Edmund Campion died on December 1, 1581
- January 22 – Joos de Damhouder, Flemish jurist (b. 1507)
- February 15 – Francisco Foreiro, Portuguese Dominican theologian and biblist (b. 1523)
- March 17 – Johann Marbach, German theologian (b. 1521)
- March 19 – Francis I, Duke of Saxe-Lauenburg (b. 1510)
- April 3 – Herbert Duifhuis, Dutch minister (b. 1531)
- April 25 – Okabe Motonobu, Japanese warrior
- May 31 – Jan Kostka, Polish noble (b. 1529)
- June 2 – James Douglas, 4th Earl of Morton, regent of Scotland (b. 1525)
- July 20 – Odet de Turnèbe, French dramatist (b. 1552)
- July 11 – Peder Skram, Danish senator and naval officer (b. 1500)
- July 12 – Johannes Gigas, German theologian (b. 1514)
- July 22 – Richard Cox, English bishop (b. 1500)
- August 17 – Duchess Sabine of Württemberg, by marriage Landgravine of Hesse-Kassel (b. 1549)
- August 20 – Katharina of Hanau, Countess of Wied, German noblewoman (b. 1525)
- August – King Mayadunne of Sitawaka (b. 1501)
- September 1 – Guru Ram Das, fourth Sikh Guru (b. 1534)
- September 16 – Peter Niers, notorious German bandit (date of birth unknown)
- September 28 – Achilles Statius, Portuguese humanist (b. 1524)
- September 29 – Andreas Musculus, German theologian (b. 1514)
- September 30 – Hubert Languet, French diplomat and reformer (b. 1518)
- October 4 – Henry Wriothesley, 2nd Earl of Southampton, English earl (b. 1545)
- October 7 – Honoré I, Lord of Monaco (b. 1522)
- October 9 – Saint Louis Bertrand, Spanish missionary to Latin America, patron saint of Colombia (b. 1526)
- October 10 – King Bayinnaung of Burma (b. 1516)
- October 23 – Michael Neander, German mathematician and astronomer (b. 1529)
- November 4 – Mathurin Romegas, French rival Grandmaster of the Knights Hospitaller (b. c.1525)
- November 7 – Richard Davies, Welsh bishop and scholar (b. c. 1505)
- November 19 – Tsarevich Ivan Ivanovich of Russia (b. 1554)
- December 1
  - Martyrs and executed of Tyburn
    - Alexander Briant, English Jesuit priest and saint (b. 1556)
    - Edmund Campion, English Jesuit priest and saint (b. 1540)
    - Ralph Sherwin, English Roman Catholic priest and saint (b. 1550)
- December 11 – Maria of Austria, Duchess of Jülich-Cleves-Berg, daughter of Emperor Ferdinand I (b. 1531)
- December 21 – Jean de la Cassière, French-born Maltese 51st Grandmaster of the Knights Hospitaller (b. 1502)
- date unknown
  - Christopher Báthory, prince of Transylvania (b. 1530)
  - Guillaume Postel, French linguist (b. 1510)
  - Agatha Streicher, German physician (b. 1520)
  - Nicholas Sanders, English Catholic propagandist (b. 1530)

1582

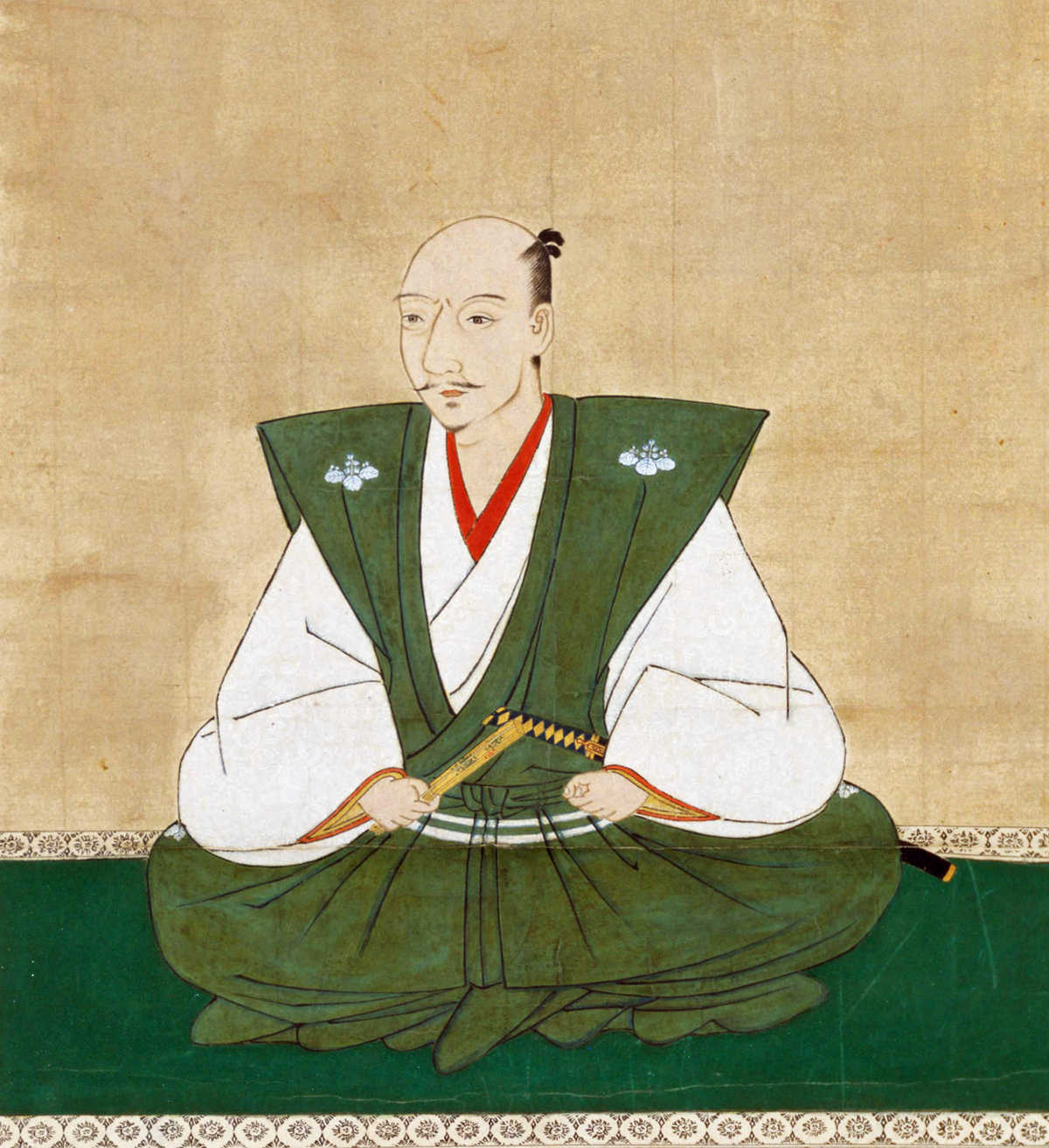
Oda Nobunaga

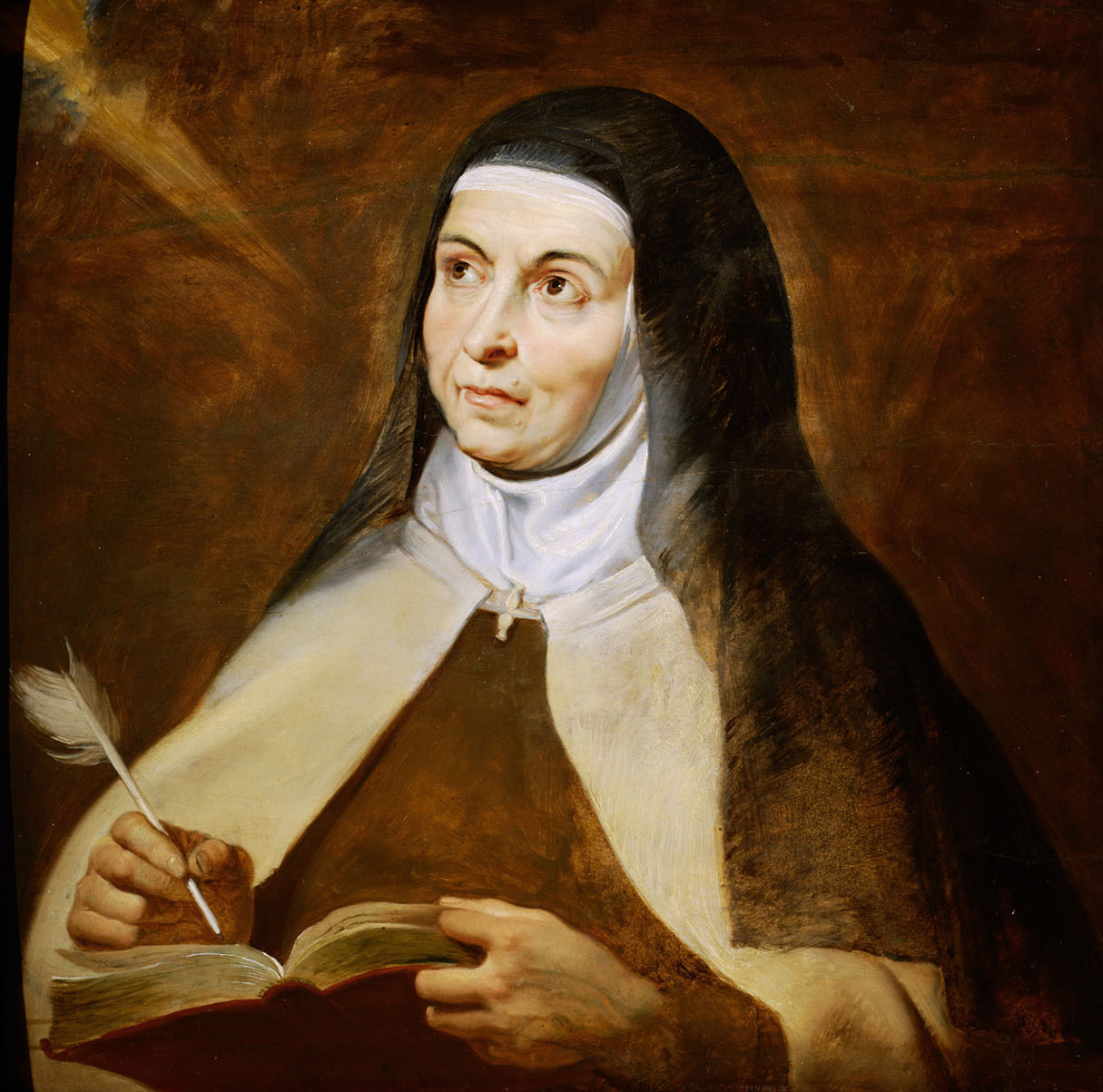
Saint Teresa of Avila

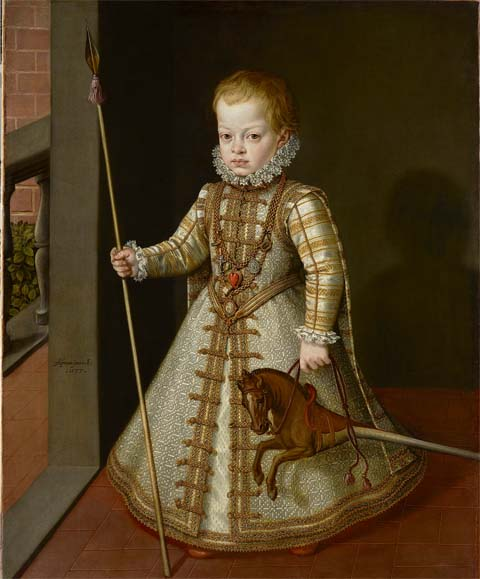
Diego, Prince of Asturias

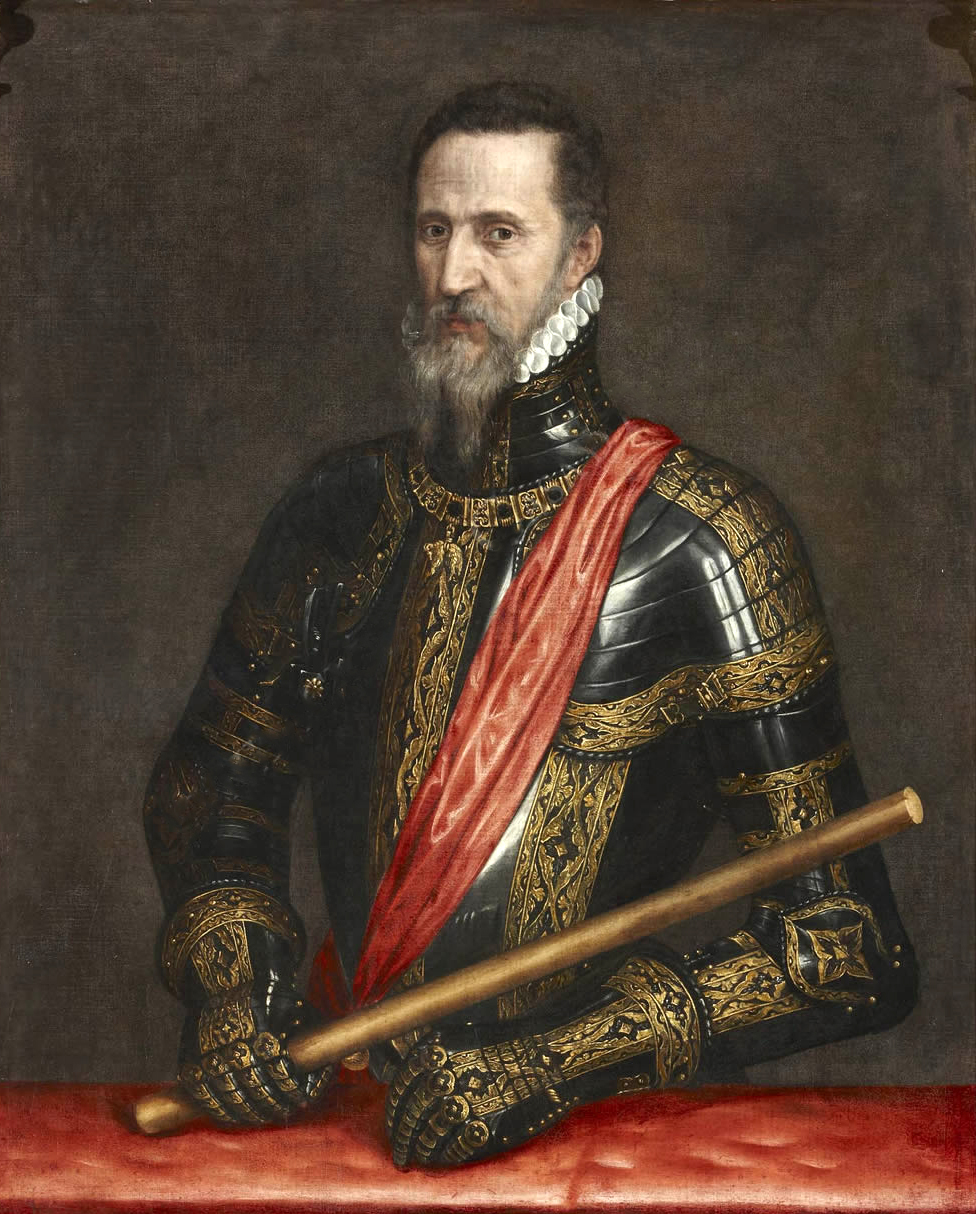
Fernando Álvarez de Toledo

- January 23 – Jean Bauhin, French physician (b. 1511)
- January 26 – Thomas Platter, Swiss humanist scholar (b. 1499)
- February 18 – Sakuma Nobumori, Japanese retainer and samurai (b. 1528)
- March 14 – Elisabeth of Hesse, Electress Palatine by marriage (1576-1582) (b. 1539)
- March 18 – Juan Jauregui, attempted assassin of William I of Orange (b. 1562)
- March 22 – Daniel Brendel von Homburg, Roman Catholic archbishop (b. 1522)
- March 29 – Philip de' Medici, Italian noble, Grand Prince of Tuscany (b. 1577)
- April 3 – Takeda Katsuyori, Japanese daimyō of Takeda Clan (b. 1546)
- April 16 – Oyamada Nobushige, Japanese samurai (b. 1545)
- April 21 – Francisco de Toledo, Spanish soldier and politician (b. 1515)
- May 3 – Giorgio Mainerio, Italian composer (b. 1530)
- May 5 – Charlotte of Bourbon, Princess consort of Orange, married to William I of Orange (b. 1547)
- June 13 – Matteo Tafuri, Italian alchemist (b. 1492)
- June 21
  - Oda Nobunaga, Japanese daimyō of the Oda Clan (b. 1534) (forced suicide)
  - Oda Nobutada, Japanese samurai, oldest son of Nobunaga (b. 1557) (forced suicide)
  - Anayama Nobukimi, Japanese military commander (b. 1541)
- June 23 – Shimizu Muneharu, Japanese military commander (b. 1537)
- July 2 – Akechi Mitsuhide, Japanese samurai and warlord (b. 1528)
- July 3 – James Crichton, Scottish scholar (b. 1560)
- July 7 – Kawajiri Hidetaka, Japanese samurai (b. 1527)
- July 17 – Jacques Peletier du Mans, French mathematician (b. 1517)
- September 23 – Louis, Duke of Montpensier (b. 1513)
- September 28 – George Buchanan, Scottish humanist scholar (b. 1506)
- October 4 – Teresa of Ávila, Spanish Carmelite nun, poet and saint (b. 1515)
- October 21 – Laurent Joubert, French physician (b. 1529)
- November 21 – Diego, Prince of Asturias, Portuguese prince (b. 1575)
- December 11 – Fernando Álvarez de Toledo, 3rd Duke of Alba, Spanish general (b. 1507)
- Date unknown:
  - Wu Cheng'en, Chinese novelist and poet of the Ming dynasty
  - Hans Hendrik van Paesschen, Flemish architect (b. 1510)
  - Zhang Juzheng, Ming dynasty official (b. 1525)
  - Takeda Nobukado, Japanese samurai (b. 1529)
  - Sen Soulintha, Laotian king of Lan Xang (b. 1511)

1583

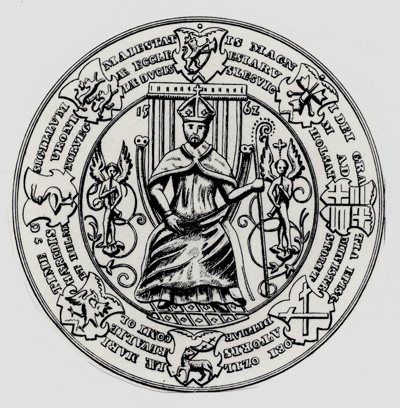
King Magnus of Livonia

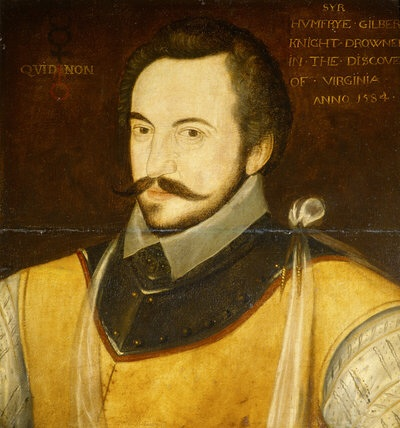
Humphrey Gilbert

- January 7 – Maria of Saxony, Duchess of Pomerania (b. 1515)
- January 22 – Antoinette de Bourbon, French noblewoman (b. 1493)
- January 28 – Pier Francesco Orsini, Italian condottiero and art patron (b. 1523)
- February 27 – Richard Madox, English explorer (b. 1546)
- March 24 – Hubert Goltzius, Dutch Renaissance painter-engraver (b. 1526)
- March 28 – King Magnus of Livonia (b. 1540)
- April – Lucas David, Prussian historian (b. 1503)
- April 17 – Ogasawara Nagatoki, Japanese daimyō (b. 1519)
- May 6 – Zacharias Ursinus, German theologian (b. 1534)
- May 23 – Günther XLI, Count of Schwarzburg-Arnstadt (b. 1529)
- June 6 – Nakagawa Kiyohide, Japanese military commander (b. 1556)
- June 9 – Thomas Radclyffe, 3rd Earl of Sussex, Lord-Lieutenant of Ireland (b. 1525)
- June 14 – Shibata Katsuie, Japanese military commander (b. 1522)
- June – Babullah of Ternate, Sultan of Ternate (b. 1528)
- July 1 – Sakuma Morimasa, Japanese samurai and warlord (beheaded) (b. 1554)
- July 6 – Edmund Grindal, Archbishop of Canterbury (b. 1519)
- August 22 – Marcantonio Maffei, Italian archbishop and cardinal (b. 1521)
- September 9 – Humphrey Gilbert, English explorer (b. c. 1537)
- September 16 – Catherine Jagiellon, queen of John III of Sweden (b. 1526)
- September 27 – Elisabeth Plainacher, Austrian alleged witch (b. 1513)
- October 22 – Louis VI, Elector Palatine (b. 1539)
- November 11 – Gerald FitzGerald, 14th Earl of Desmond, Irish rebel (b. c. 1533)
- November 24 – René de Birague, French cardinal and chancellor (b. 1506)
- December 16 – Ivan Fyodorov, Russian printer
- December 23 – Nicolás Factor, Spanish artist (b. 1520)
- December 31 – Thomas Erastus, Swiss theologian (b. 1524)
- date unknown
  - Giocangga, chieftain of the Jurchens (b. 1526)
  - Andrey Kurbsky, Russian writer (b. 1528)
  - Oda Nobutaka, Japanese samurai (b. 1558)

1584

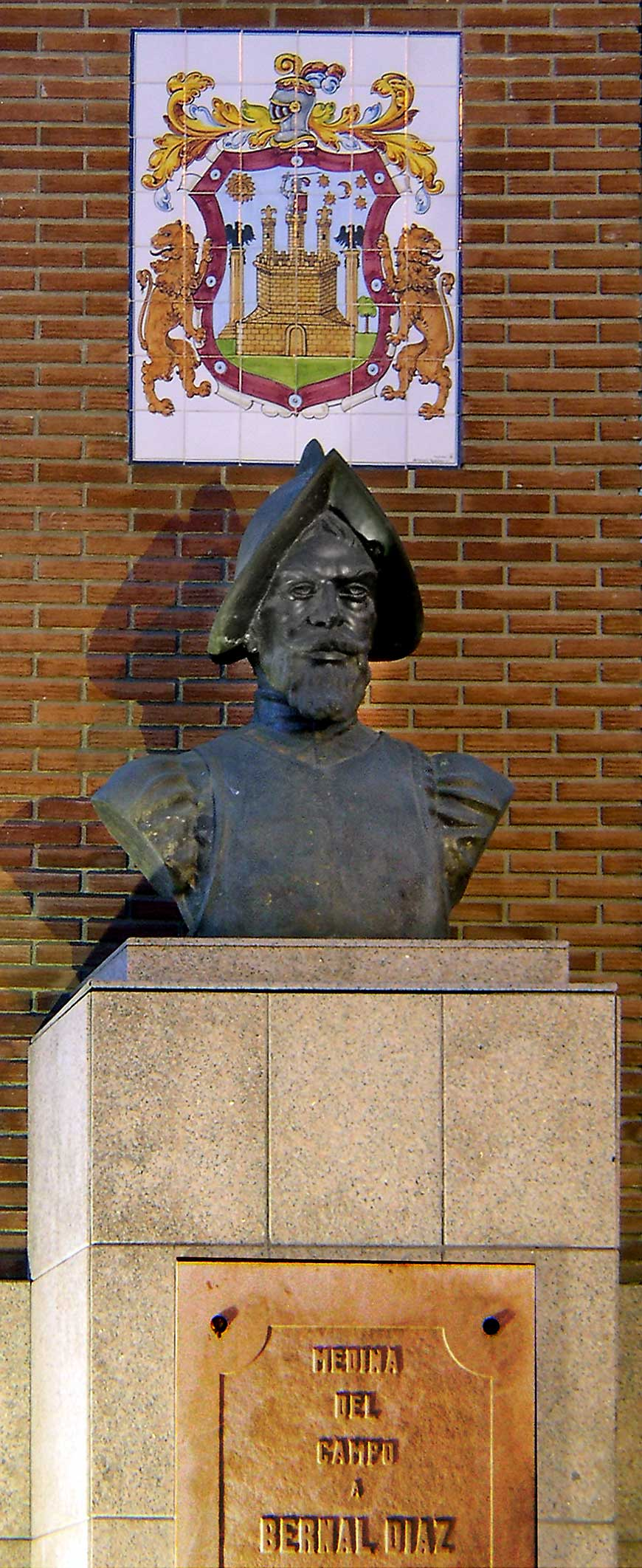
Bernal Díaz del Castillo

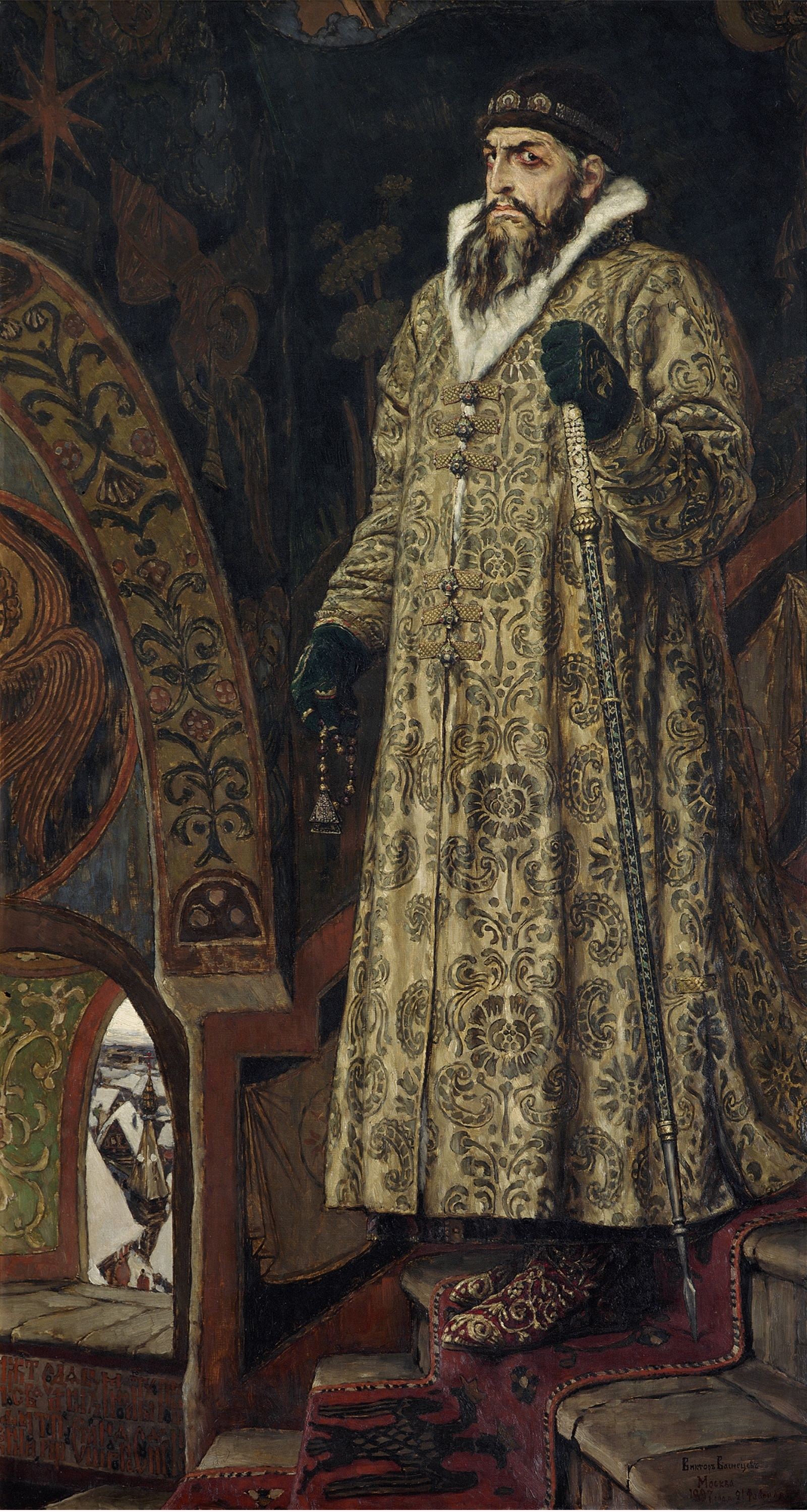
Tsar Ivan IV of Russia

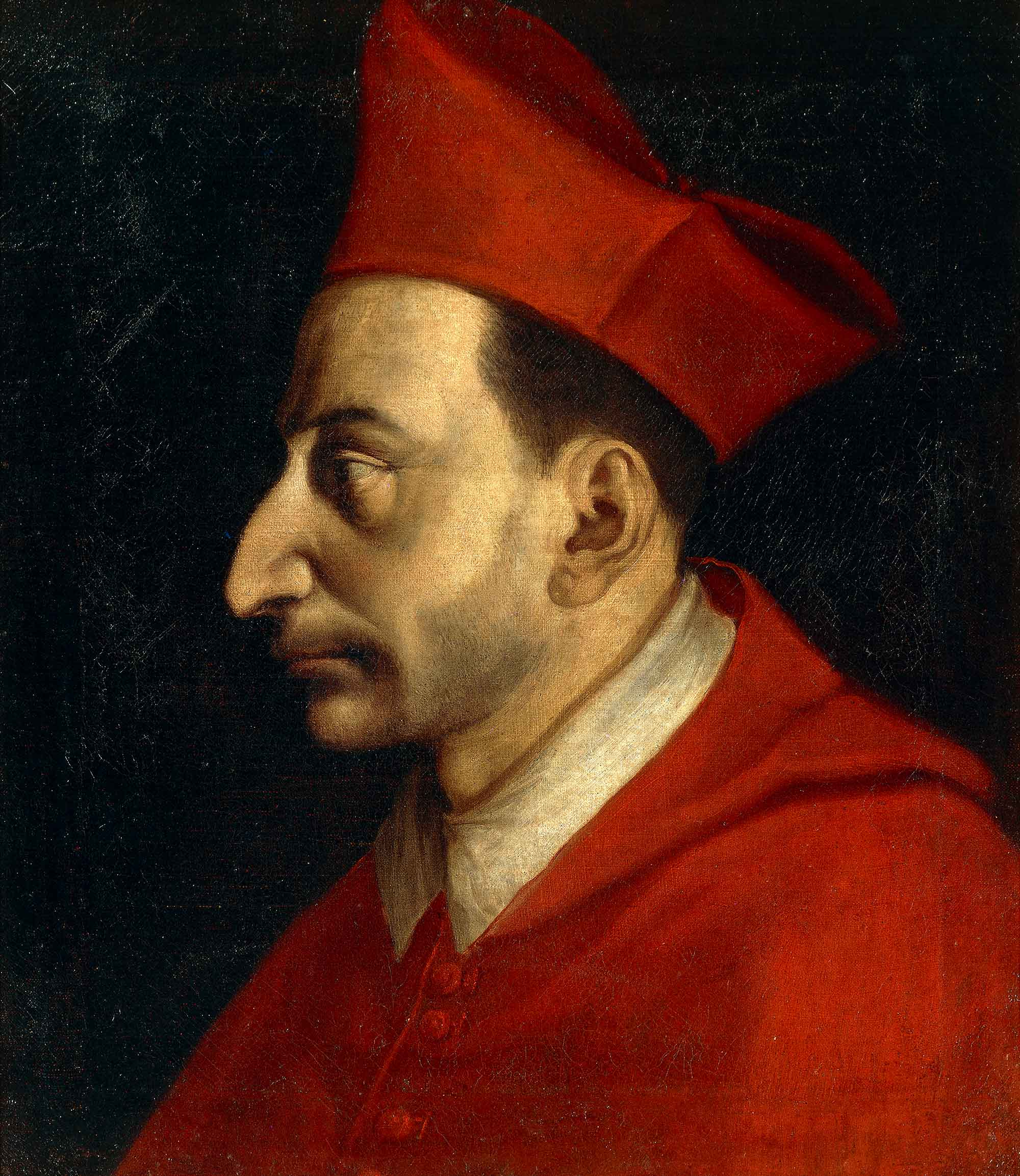
Saint Charles Borromeo

- January 4 – Tobias Stimmer, Swiss painter and drawer (b. 1539)
- January 11 – Bernal Díaz del Castillo, Spanish constiquador (b. 1496)
- January 15 – Martha Leijonhufvud, politically active Swedish noble (b. 1520)
- February 18 – Antonio Francesco Grazzini, Italian writer (b. 1503)
- February 19 – Anna de' Medici, Tuscan princess (b. 1569)
- February 27 – Yi I of Joseon, Korean Confucian scholar (b. 1536)
- March 10 – Thomas Norton, English politician and writer (b. 1532)
- March 18 – Tsar Ivan IV of Russia (b. 1530)
- May 10 – Luigi Cornaro, Italian Catholic cardinal (b. 1517)
- March 12 – Kasper Franck, German theologian (b. 1543)
- April 13 – Jan Borukowski, royal secretary of Poland (b. 1524)
- April 27 – Mikołaj "the Red" Radziwiłł, Polish magnate (b. 1512)
- May 18 – Ikeda Tsuneoki, Japanese daimyō and military commander (in battle) (b. 1536)
- May 25 – Prospero Spani, Italian sculptor (b. 1516)
- June 10 – François, Duke of Anjou (b. 1555)
- June 13 – János Zsámboky, Hungarian scholar (b. 1531)
- July 10
  - Francis Throckmorton, conspirator against Queen Elizabeth I of England (executed; b. 1554)
  - William the Silent, Prince of Orange (assassinated; b. 1533)
- July 12 – Steven Borough, English explorer (b. 1525)
- July 14 – Balthasar Gérard, French assassin of William the Silent (executed; b. 1557)
- July 23 – John Day, English Protestant printer (b. 1522)
- August 12 – Carolus Sigonius, Italian humanist (b. 1524)
- August 22 – Jan Kochanowski, Polish writer (b. 1530)
- October – Colin Campbell, 6th Earl of Argyll, Scottish noble and politician (b. 1541)
- October 17 – Richard Gwyn, Welsh Catholic martyr, canonised
- November 3 – Charles Borromeo, Italian Roman Catholic cardinal, canonised (b. 1538)
- November 17 – Eric II, Duke of Brunswick-Lüneburg (b. 1528)
- December 26 – Giovanni Francesco Commendone, Italian Catholic cardinal (b. 1523)
- date unknown
  - Elena Anguissola, Italian painter and nun (b. c. 1532)
  - Michał Wiśniowiecki, Polish–Lithuanian noble (b. 1529)

1585

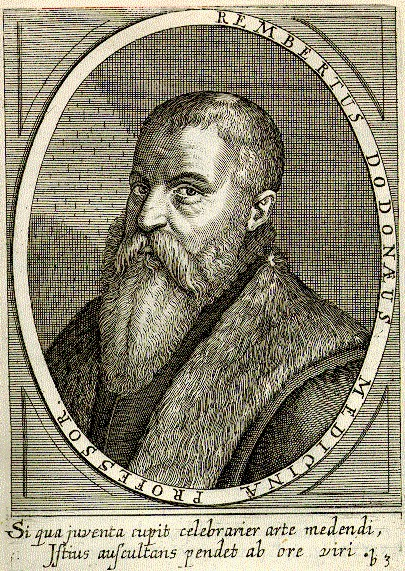
Rembert Dodoens

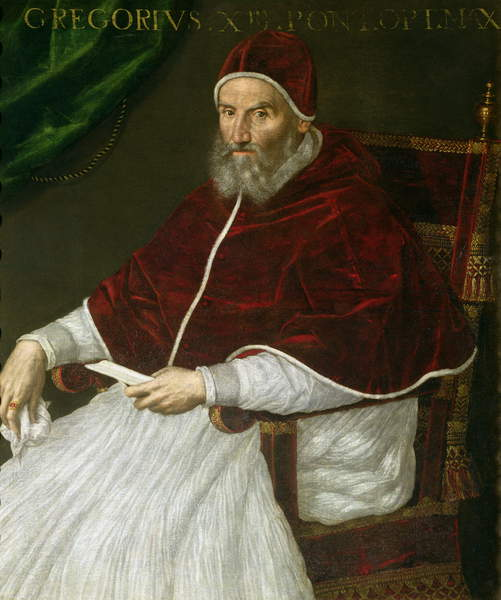
Pope Gregory XIII

- January 16 – Edward Clinton, 1st Earl of Lincoln, English admiral (b. 1512)
- February 6 – Edmund Plowden, English legal scholar (b. 1518)
- February 13 – Alfonso Salmeron, Spanish Jesuit biblical scholar (b. 1515)
- March 10 – Rembert Dodoens, Flemish physician and botanist (b. 1517)
- April 3 – Thomas Goldwell, English ecclesiastic (b. 1501)
- April 22 – Henry of Saxe-Lauenburg, Prince-Archbishop of Bremen, Prince-Bishop of Osnabrück and Paderborn (b. 1550)
- April 10 – Pope Gregory XIII (b. 1502)
- May 15 – Niwa Nagahide, Japanese warlord (b. 1535)
- June 4 – Muretus, French humanist (b. 1526)
- June 18 – Jacques, Duke of Nemours, French nobleman and soldier (b. 1531)
- June 21 – Henry Percy, 8th Earl of Northumberland, English nobleman and conspirator, suicide (b. 1532)
- June 19 – Francisco de Holanda, Portuguese artist (b. 1517)
- June 22 – Simon Sulzer, Swiss theologian (b. 1508)
- July 6 – Thomas Aufield, English Catholic martyr (b. 1552)
- July 28 – Francis Russell, 2nd Earl of Bedford, English nobleman, soldier and politician (b. 1527)
- c. July? – Shimon Lavi, Sephardi kabbalist (b. 1486)
- August 5 or August 6 – Yermak Timofeyevich, Cossack leader and explorer of Siberia
- September 6 – Luca Cambiasi, Italian painter (b. 1527)
- October 1 – Anne of Denmark, Electress of Saxony (b. 1532)
- October 19 – Johannes Crato von Krafftheim, German humanist and physician (b. 1519)
- October 29 – Özdemiroğlu Osman Pasha, Ottoman (Turkish) grand vizier (b. 1526)
- November 2 – Tachibana Dōsetsu, Japanese daimyō (b. 1513)
- November 23 – Thomas Tallis, English composer (b. c. 1510)
- December 27 – Pierre de Ronsard, French poet (b. 1524)
- November 28 – Hernando Franco, Spanish composer (b. 1532)
- December 4 – John Willock, Scottish reformer (b. c. 1515)
- December 22 – Vittoria Accoramboni, Italian noblewoman (b. 1557)
- approx. date – Qiu Zhu, Chinese painter
- date unknown
  - Taqi ad-Din Muhammad ibn Ma'ruf, Turkish scientist (b. 1526)
  - Nguyễn Bỉnh Khiêm, Vietnamese administrator, educator, poet, sage and later a saint of the Cao Dai religion (b. 1491)

1586

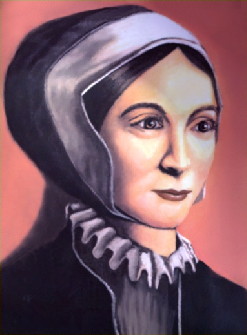
Saint Margaret Clitherow

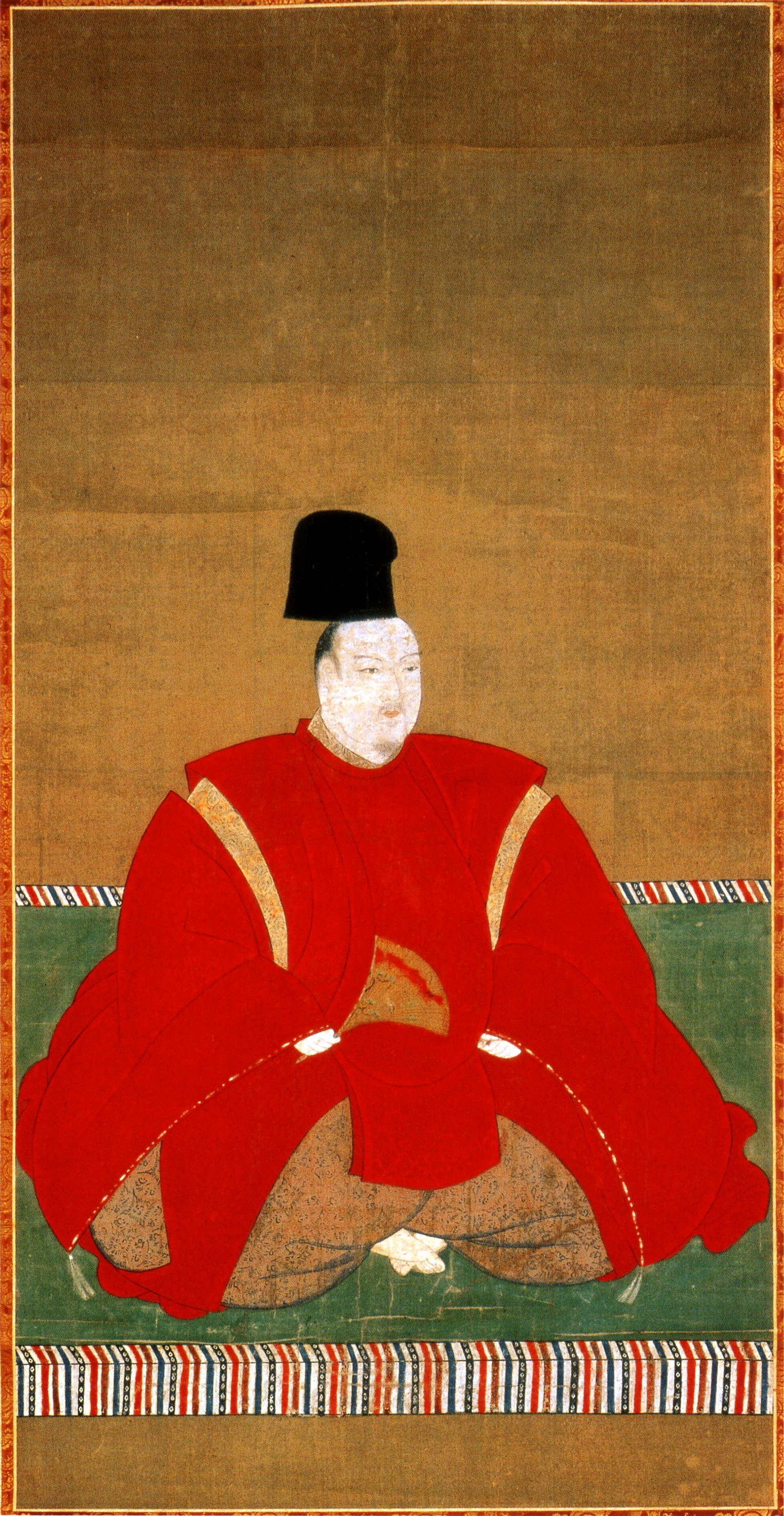
Prince Masahito

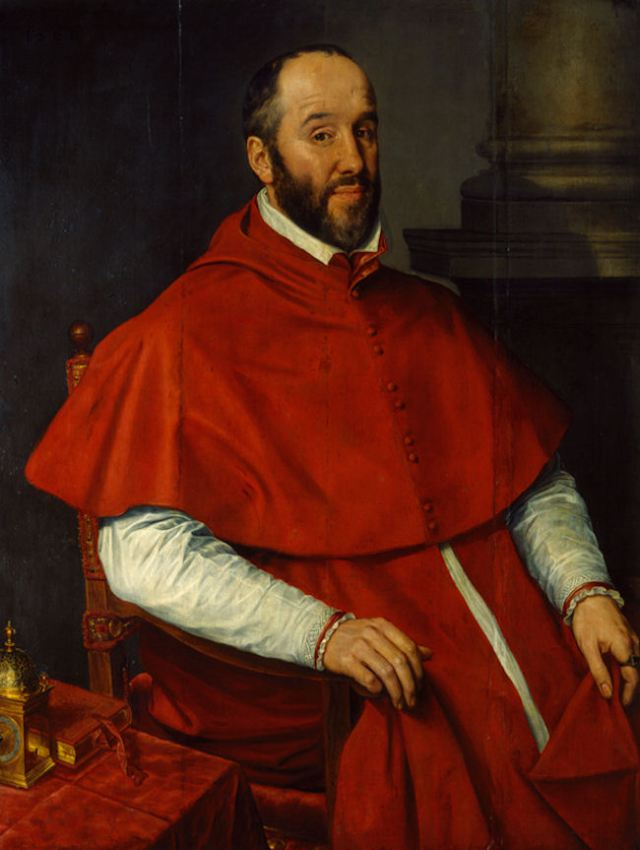
Antoine Perrenot de Granvelle

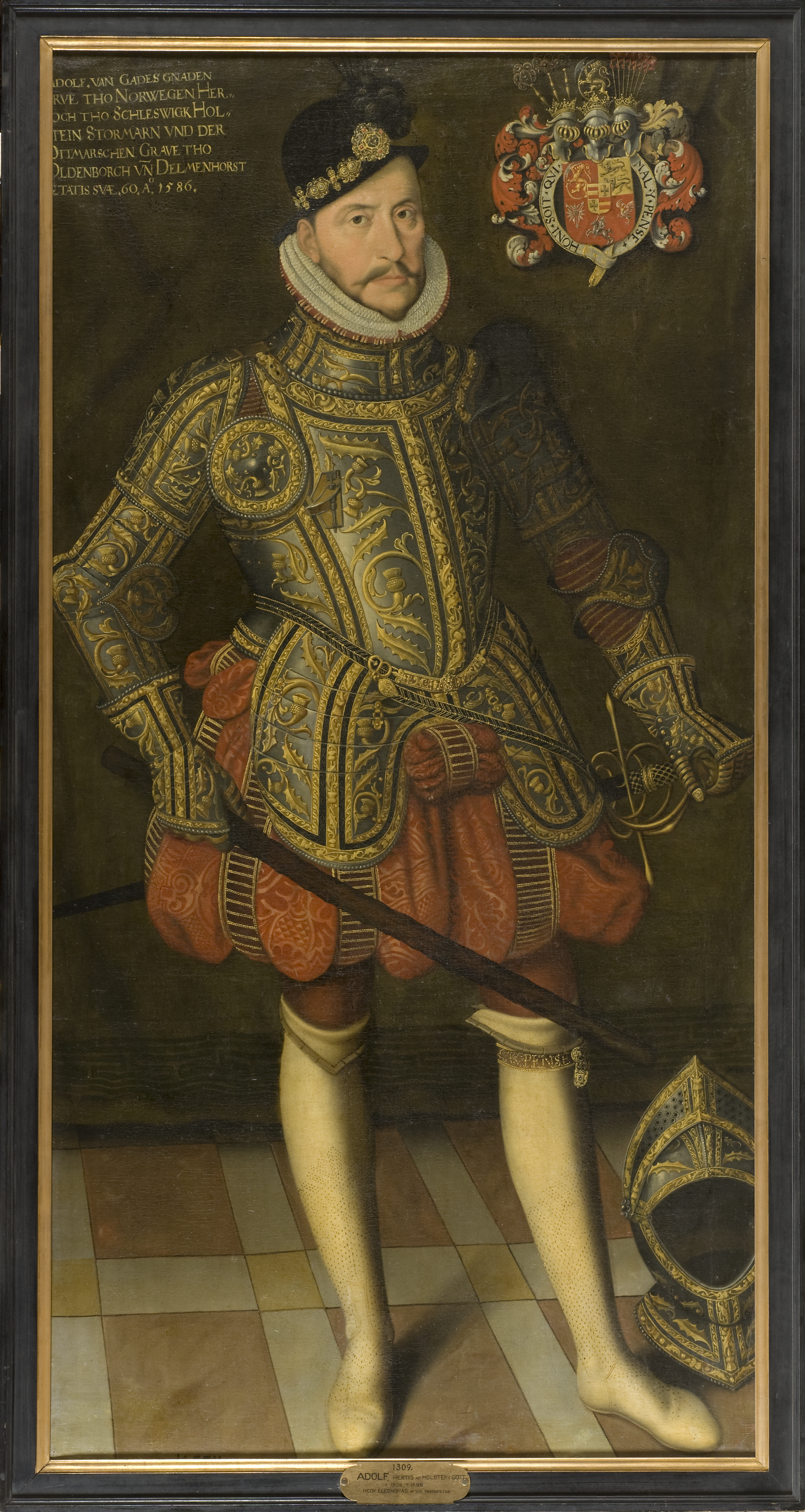
Adolf, Duke of Holstein-Gottorp

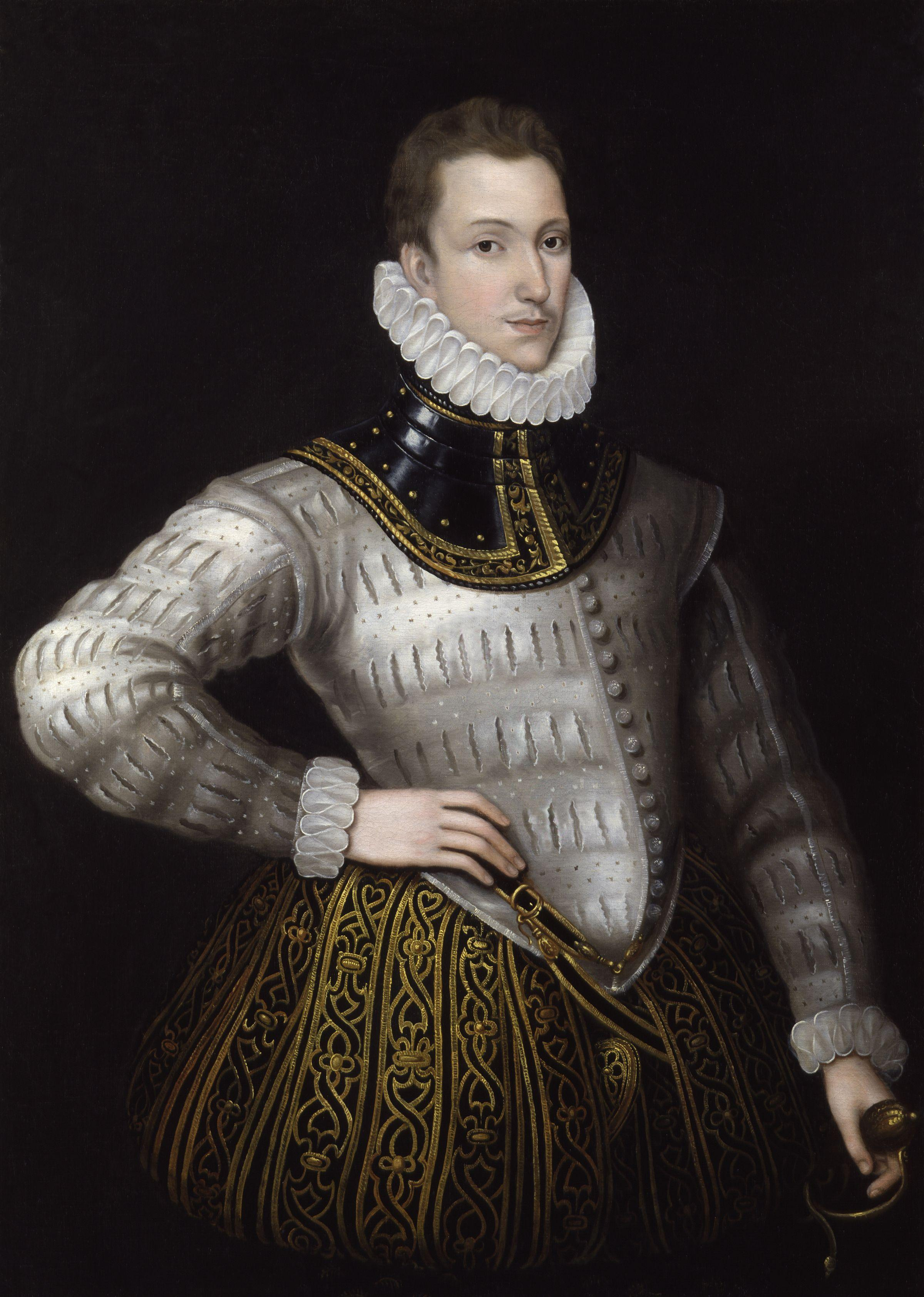
Philip Sidney

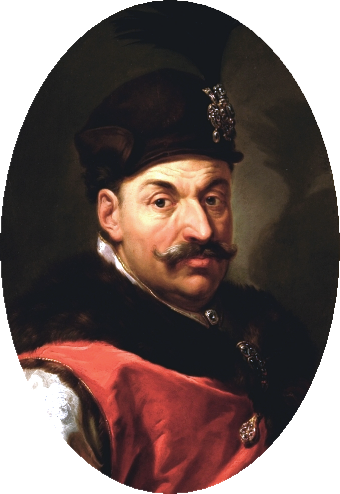
King Stefan Batory

- January 18 – Margaret of Austria, regent of the Netherlands (b. 1522)
- January 25 – Lucas Cranach the Younger, German painter (b. 1515)
- February 11 – Augustus, Elector of Saxony (b. 1526)
- March 1 – Amalia of Cleves, German princess and writer (b. 1517)
- March 25 – Margaret Clitherow, English Roman Catholic nun, saint and martyr (b. 1556)
- March 30 – Anna of Veldenz, Margrave of Baden (b. 1540)
- April 8 – Martin Chemnitz, Lutheran reformer (b. 1522)
- May 5 – Henry Sidney, Lord Deputy of Ireland (b. 1529)
- May 7 – George II of Brieg, Duke of Brieg (1547–1586) (b. 1523)
- May 9 – Luis de Morales, Spanish religious painter (b. 1510)
- May 29 – Adam Lonicer, German botanist (b. 1528)
- June 1 – Martín de Azpilcueta, Spanish theologian and economist (b. 1491)
- June 5 – Matthew Wesenbeck, Belgian jurist (b. 1531)
- June 9 – Filippo Boncompagni, Italian Catholic cardinal (b. 1548)
- June 28 – Primož Trubar, Carniolan Protestant reformer (b. 1508)
- July 5 – Ludwig Lavater, Swiss Reformed theologian (b. 1527)
- July 12 – Edward Sutton, 4th Baron Dudley (b. 1525)
- August 1 – Richard Maitland, Scottish statesman and historian (b. 1496)
- September 7 – Prince Masahito, member of the Japanese imperial family (b. 1552)
- September 18 – Ottavio Farnese, Duke of Parma (b. 1521)
- September 20
  - Sir Anthony Babington, English Catholic conspirator (executed) (b. 1561)
  - Chidiock Tichborne, English conspirator and poet (executed) (b. 1558)
- September 21 – Antoine Perrenot de Granvelle, French Roman Catholic cardinal (b. 1517)
- October 1 – Adolf, Duke of Holstein-Gottorp (b. 1526)
- October 15 – Elizabeth of Denmark, Duchess of Mecklenburg, Danish princess (b. 1524)
- October 17 – Philip Sidney, English poet, courtier and soldier (b. 1554)
- October 28 – John Günther I, Count of Schwarzburg-Sondershausen (b. 1532)
- November 6 – Willem IV van den Bergh, Stadtholder of Guelders and Zutphen (b. 1537)
- December 6 – Joachim Ernest, Prince of Anhalt (b. 1536)
- December 12 – Stefan Batory, King of Poland (b. 1533)
- December 30 – Luigi d'Este, Italian Catholic cardinal (b. 1538

1587

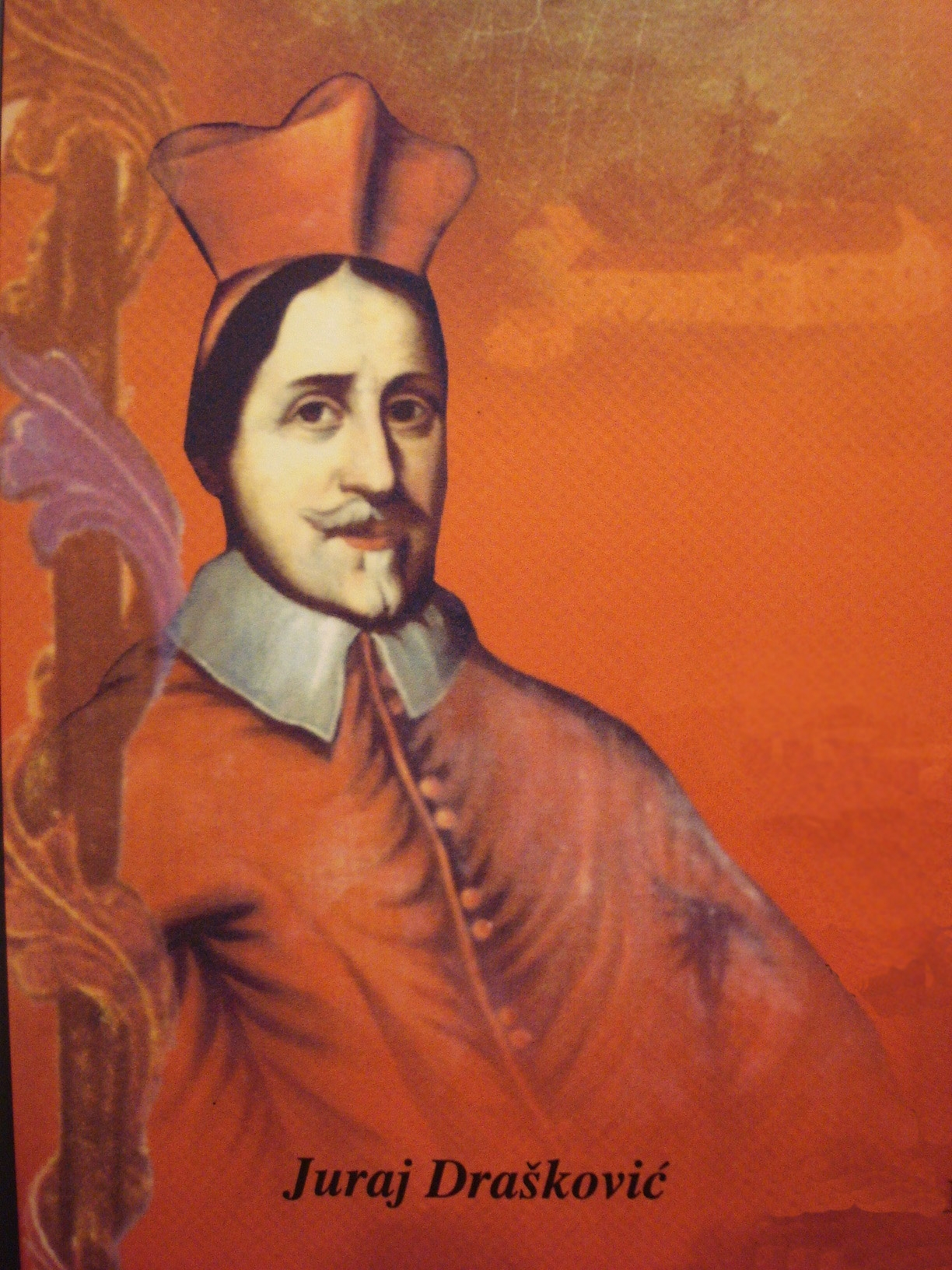
Juraj Drašković

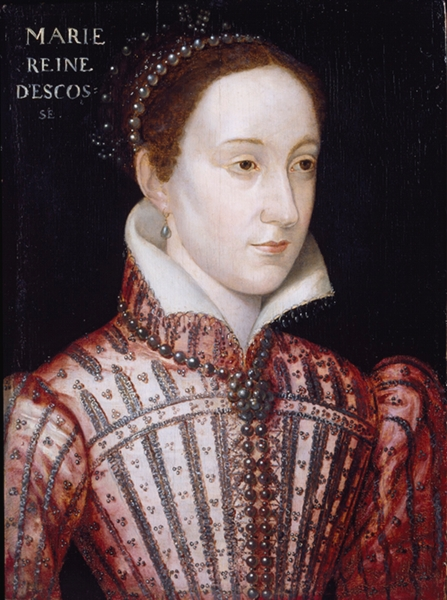
Mary, Queen of Scots

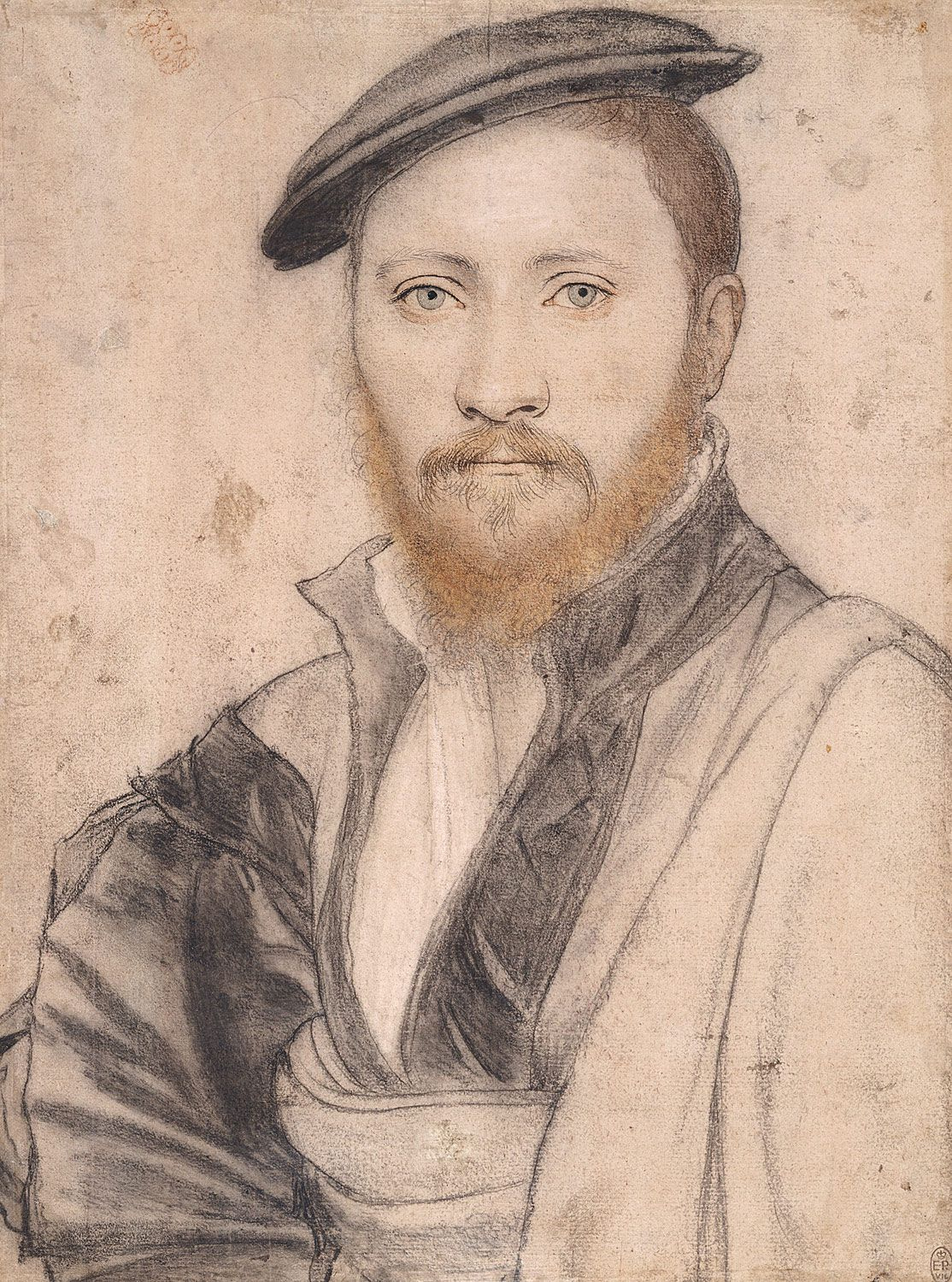
Ralph Sadler

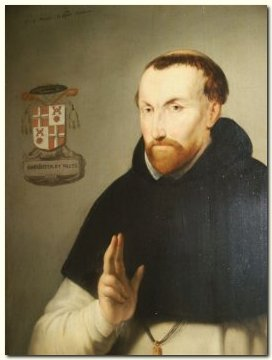
Godfried van Mierlo

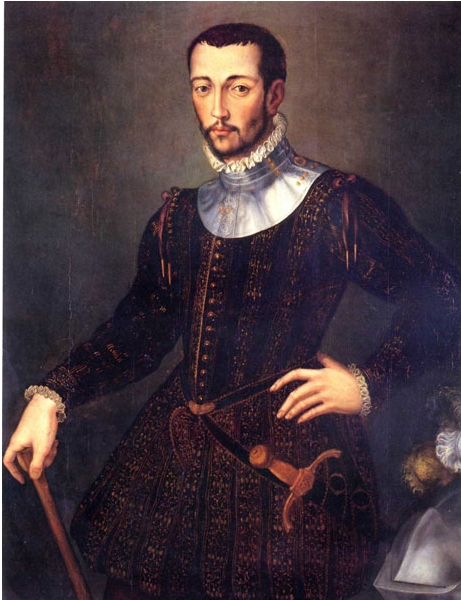
Francesco I de' Medici, Grand Duke of Tuscany

- January 31 – Juraj Drašković, Croatian Roman Catholic cardinal (b. 1525)
- January – Thomas Seckford, English official (b. 1515)
- February 8 – Mary, Queen of Scots (executed) (b. 1542)
- February 9 – Vincenzo Ruffo, Italian composer (b. 1510)
- February 13 – Dorothea of Saxony, Duchess of Brunswick-Wolfenbüttel (b. 1563)
- February 22 – Sophie of Brandenburg-Ansbach, princess of Brandenburg-Ansbach (b. 1535)
- February 26 – Magdalene of Lippe, Countess of Lippe by birth, and Landgravine of Hesse-Darmstadt (b. 1552)
- March 15 – Caspar Olevian, German theologian (b. 1536)
- March 30 – Ralph Sadler, English statesman (b. 1507)
- April 10 – Henry III, Duke of Münsterberg-Oels (b. 1542)
- April 11 – Thomas Bromley, English lord chancellor (b. 1530)
- April 8 – John Foxe, English author (b. 1516)
- April 14 – Edward Manners, 3rd Earl of Rutland (b. 1549)
- April 16 – Anne Seymour, Duchess of Somerset (b. c. 1510)
- May 9 – Jakob Schegk, German physician (b. 1511)
- May 17 – Gotthard Kettler, Duke of Courland and Semigallia (b. 1517)
- May 29 – Ignatius Ni'matallah, Syriac Orthodox patriarch of Antioch (b. c. 1515)
- June 11 – Ōtomo Sōrin, Japanese Christian daimyō (b. 1530)
- June 15 – Frederick II, Duke of Holstein-Gottorp (b. 1568)
- June 23 – Ōmura Sumitada, Japanese Christian daimyō (b. 1533)
- July 7 – Joachim of Zollern, Titular Count of Hohenzollern (b. 1554)
- July 28 – Godfried van Mierlo, Dutch Dominican friar and bishop (b. 1518)
- August 14 – Guglielmo Gonzaga, Duke of Mantua (b. 1538)
- August 29 – Vincenzo Bellavere, Italian composer (b. c. 1540)
- September 3 – Henry Cheyne, 1st Baron Cheyne, English politician and baron (b. 1540)
- September 9 – George Douglas (martyr), Scottish secular priest and martyr (b.c. 1540)
- September 19 – Jacobus Pamelius, Belgian bishop (b. 1536)
- October 19 – Francesco I de' Medici, Grand Duke of Tuscany (b. 1541)
- October 20 – Anne de Joyeuse, Duke of Joyeuse, French commander, (b. 1560)
- November 1 – Alfonso d'Este, Lord of Montecchio, Italian nobleman (b. 1527)
- November 10 – Abe Motozane, Japanese warlord (b. 1513)
- November 13 – Hai Rui, Ming Dynasty "model official" (b. 1514)
- December 11 – Andreas Gaill, German jurist and statesman (b. 1526)
- date unknown
  - Dudley Fenner, English Puritan divine (b. c. 1558)
  - Jan Tarło, Polish nobleman (b. 1527)
- probable – George Whetstone, English writer (b. 1544)

1588

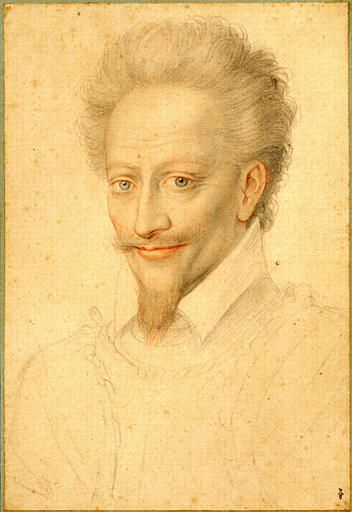
Henri, Prince of Conde

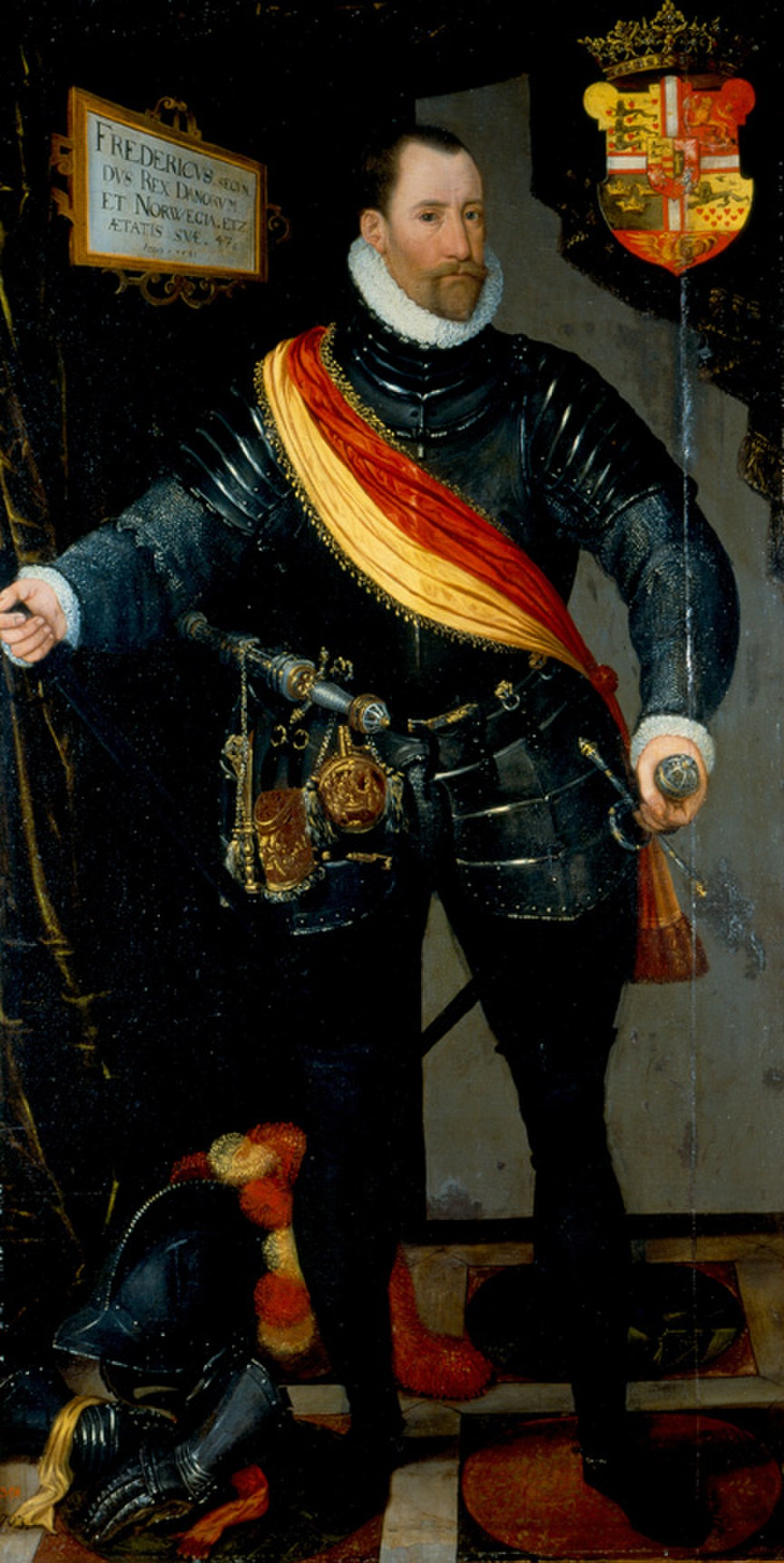
King Frederick II of Denmark

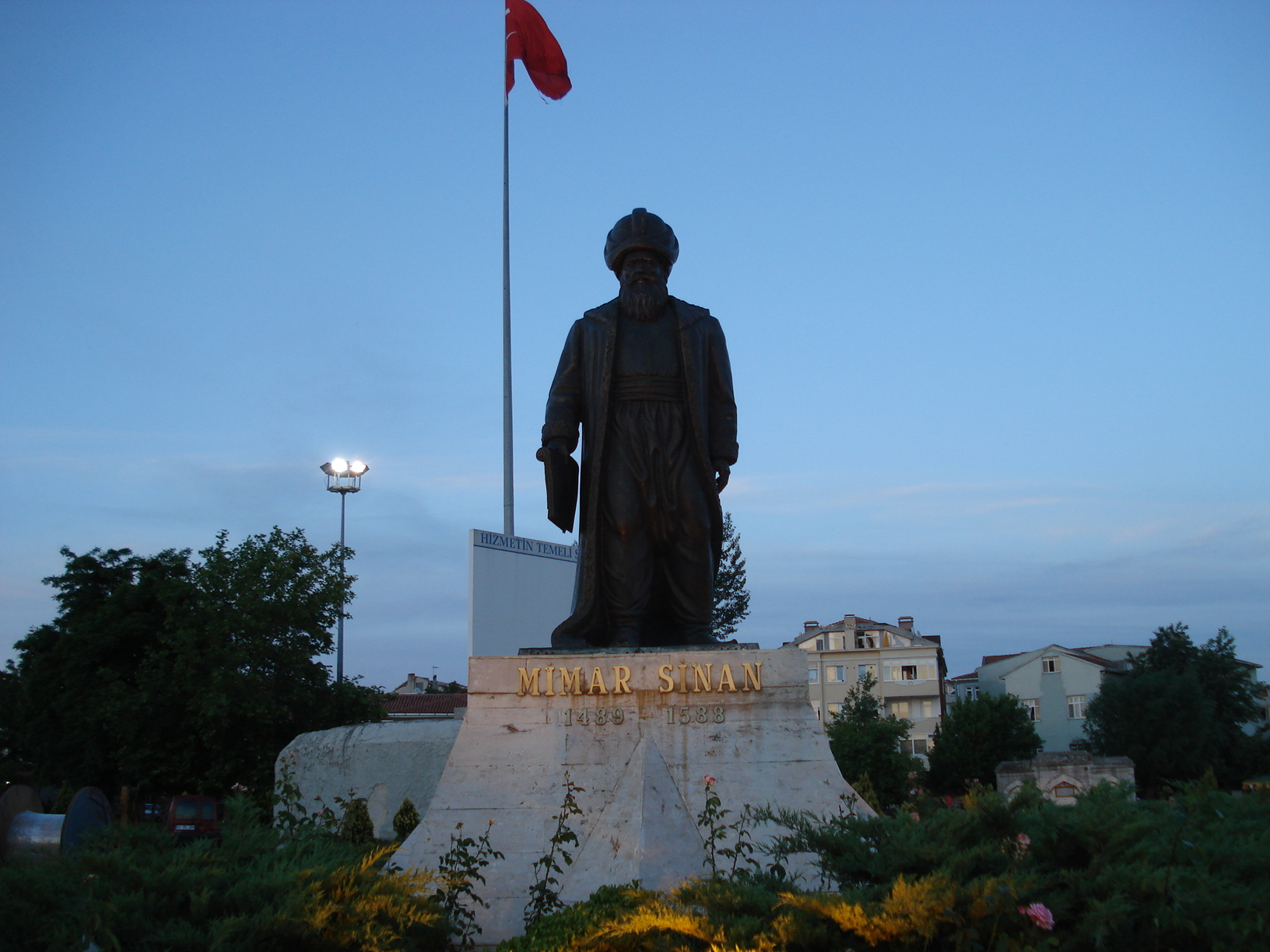
Mimar Sinan

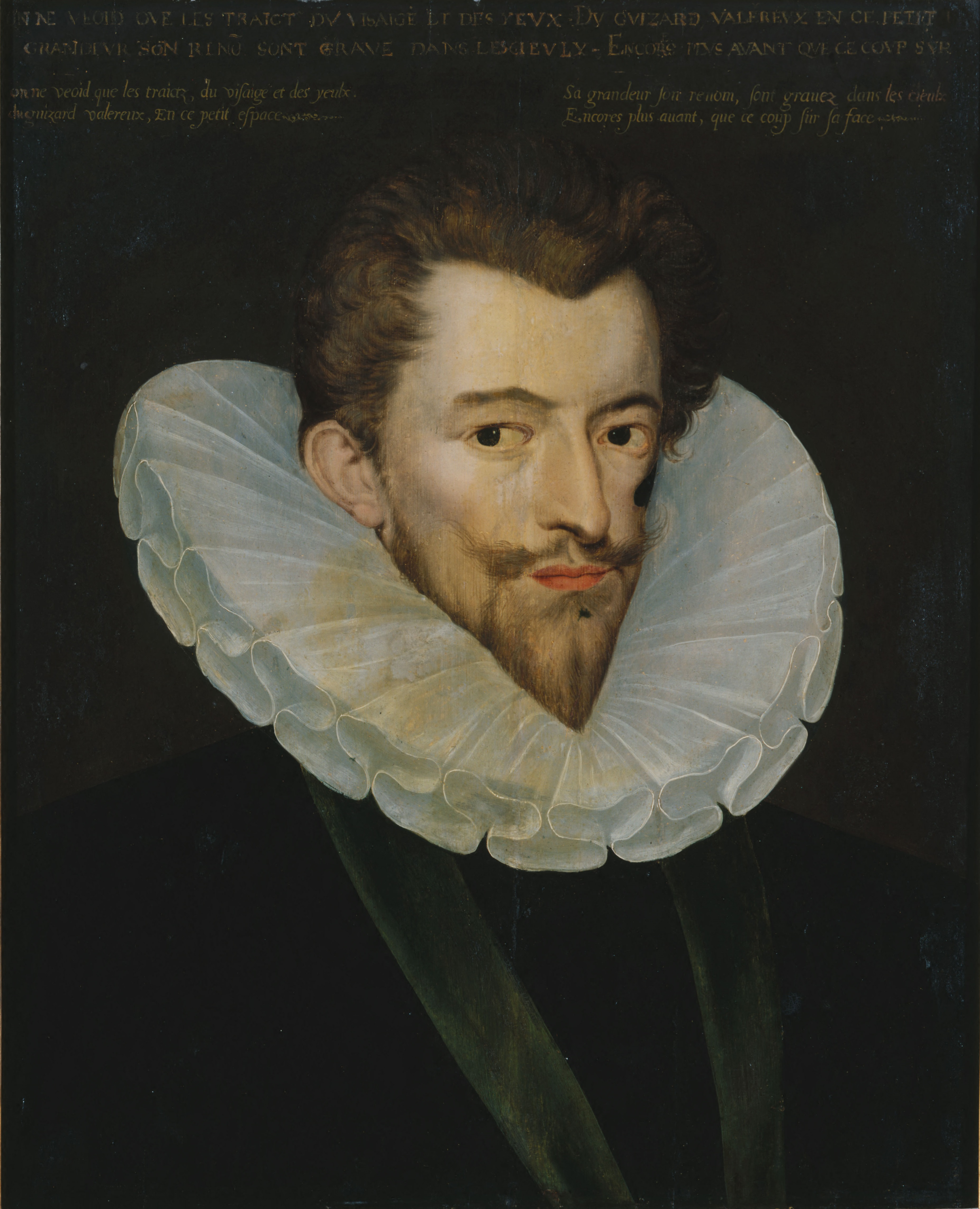
Henry I, Duke of Guise

- January 17 – Qi Jiguang, Chinese general (b. 1528)
- February 9 – Álvaro de Bazán, 1st Marquis of Santa Cruz, Spanish admiral (b. 1526)
- February 24 – Johann Weyer, Dutch physician and occultist (b. 1515)
- March 3 – Henry XI of Legnica, Duke of Legnica (b. 1539)
- March 5 – Henri, Prince of Condé (b. 1552)
- March 10 – Theodor Zwinger, Swiss scholar (b. 1533)
- April 4 – King Frederick II of Denmark (b. 1534)
- April 19 – Paolo Veronese, Italian painter (b. c. 1528)
- May 5 – Giorgio Biandrata, Italian physician (b. 1515)
- May 12 – Peter Monau, German physician (b. 1551)
- June 5 – Anne Cecil, Countess of Oxford, English countess (b. 1556)
- June 7 – Philip II, Margrave of Baden-Baden (b. 1559)
- June 10 – Valentin Weigel, German theologian (b. 1533).
- June 13 – Countess Anna of Nassau (b. 1563)
- June 18 – Robert Crowley, London stationer (b. 1517)
- July 17 – Mimar Sinan, Ottoman architect (b. 1489)
- August 6 – Josias I, Count of Waldeck-Eisenberg, Count of Waldeck-Eisenberg (1578-1588) (b. 1554)
- August 8 – Alonso Sánchez Coello, Spanish painter (b. c. 1531)
- August 12 – Alfonso Ferrabosco the elder, Italian composer (b. 1543)
- August 30 – Margaret Ward, English saint (birthdate unknown)
- August 31 – Juliana of Nassau-Dillenburg, Dutch prince (b. 1546)
- September 3 – Richard Tarlton, English actor (b. 1530)
- September 4 – Robert Dudley, 1st Earl of Leicester, English politician (b. 1532)
- September 25 – Tilemann Heshusius, German Gnesio-Lutheran theologian (b. 1527)
- September 26 – Amias Paulet, Governor of Jersey (b. 1532)
- October 1 – Edward James, English Catholic martyr (executed at Chichester)
- October 2 – Bernardino Telesio, Italian philosopher and natural scientist (b. 1509)
- October 23 – Juan Martínez de Recalde, Spanish admiral (b. c. 1540)
- November 1 – Jean Daurat, French poet and scholar (b. 1508)
- December 19 – Esther Handali, Ottoman businessperson
- December 23 – Henry I, Duke of Guise, French Catholic leader (b. 1550)
- December 24 – Louis II, Cardinal of Guise, French Catholic cardinal (b. 1555)
- date unknown
  - Diego Durán, Dominican friar and historian in colonial Mexico (b. c. 1537).
  - John Field, British Puritan clergyman and controversialist (b. 1545)
  - Sonam Gyatso, 3rd Dalai Lama, the first Dalai Lama to use the title (b. 1543)
  - Plautilla Nelli, Italian painter (b. 1524)
  - Edwin Sandys, English prelate (b. 1519)
  - Kenau Simonsdochter Hasselaer, Dutch war heroine (b. 1526)

1589

Philothei

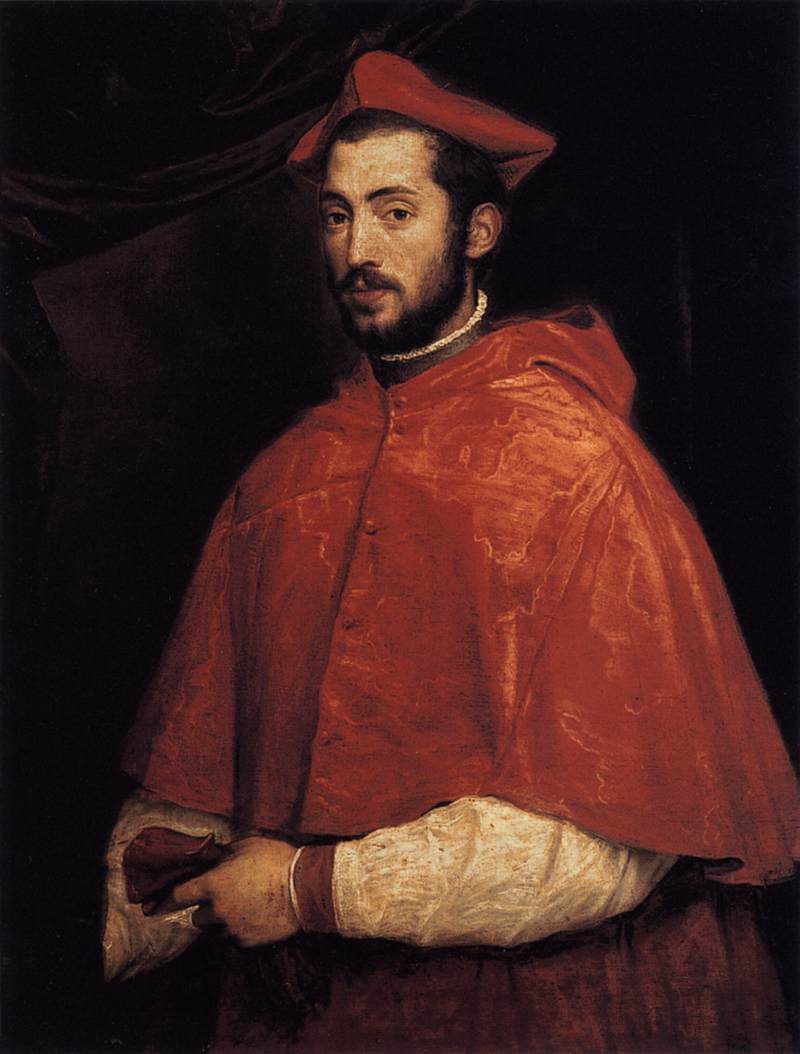
Alessandro Farnese

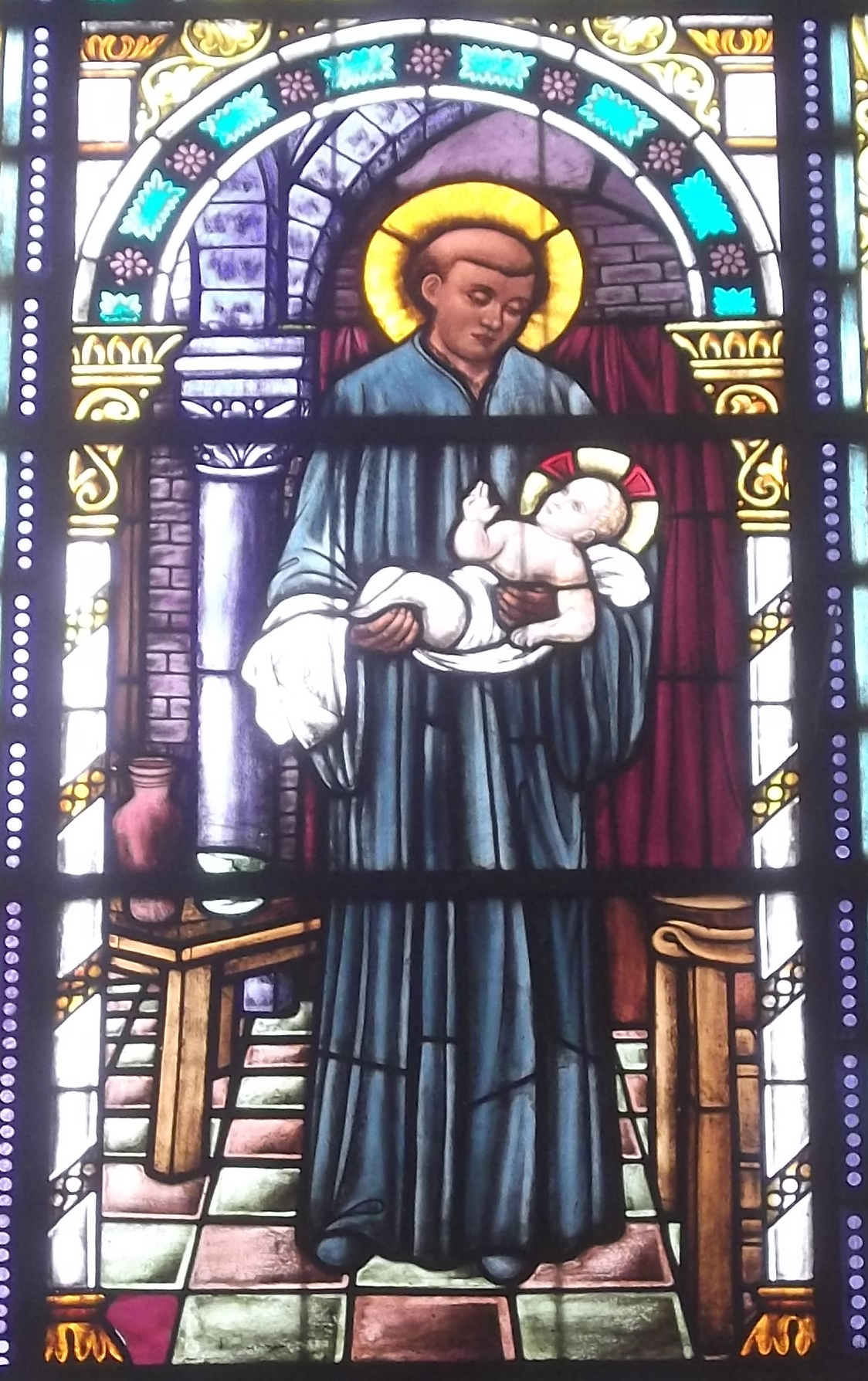
Saint Benedict the Moor

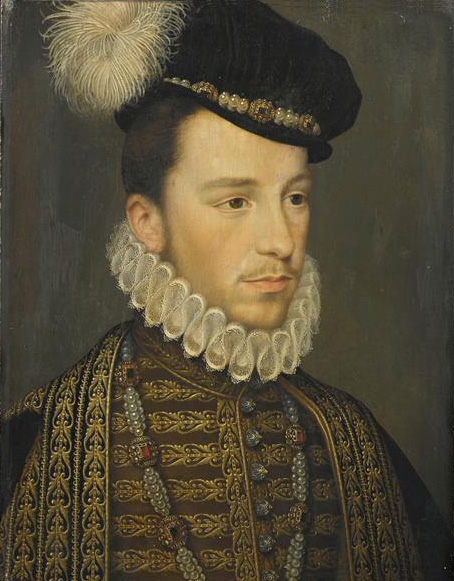
Henry III of France

- January 5 – Catherine de' Medici, queen of Henry II of France (b. 1519)
- January 18 – Magnus Heinason, Faroese naval hero (b. 1545)
- February 19 – Philothei, Greek Orthodox religious sister, martyr and saint (b. 1522)
- March 2 – Alessandro Farnese, Italian cardinal (b. 1530)
- March 3 – Johannes Sturm, German educator (b. 1507)
- March 19 – Heo Nanseolheon, Korean poet (b. 1563)
- March 22 – Lodovico Guicciardini, Italian historian (b. 1521)
- March 23 – Marcin Kromer, Prince-Bishop of Warmia (b. 1512)
- April 26
  - Benedict the Moor, Italian Franciscan friar and saint (b. 1526)
  - Tansen, Indian musician (b. c.1493/1500)
- May 3 – Julius, Duke of Brunswick-Lüneburg (b. 1528)
- May 17 – Charles II, Lord of Monaco (b. 1555)
- May 20 – Anna Maria of Brandenburg-Ansbach, German princess (b. 1526)
- July 1 – Lady Saigō, Japanese concubine (b. 1552)
- July 16 – Petrus Peckius the Elder, Dutch jurist, writer on international maritime law (b. 1529)
- July 29 – Maria of the Palatinate-Simmern, Duchess consort of Södermanland (1579–1589) (b. 1561)
- August 1 – Jacques Clément, French assassin of Henry III of France (b. 1567)
- August 2 – King Henry III of France (b. 1551)
- September 16 – Michael Baius, Flemish theologian (b. 1513)
- September 19 – Jean-Antoine de Baïf, French poet (b. 1532)
- October 1 – William Darrell of Littlecote, English politician (b. 1539)
- October 15 – Jacopo Zabarella, Italian philosopher (b. 1532)
- October 31 – Peter Stumpp, German alleged serial killer "the Werewolf of Bedburg" (b. 1535)
- November 15 – Philipp Apian, German mathematician and medic (b. 1531)
- December 10 – Henry Compton, 1st Baron Compton, English politician (b. 1544)
- December 12 – Francisco Balbi di Correggio, Italian soldier in the service of Spain during the Siege of Malta (b. 1505)
  - Pietro de' Mariscalchi, Italian painter (b. 1520)
  - Charles Dançay, French diplomat (b. 1510)
  - (after September 25) – John Stubbs, English seditious pamphleteer, in France (b. 1543)
