= 1581 =

1581 in various calendars
- Gregorian calendar: 1581; MDLXXXI
- Ab urbe condita: 2334
- Armenian calendar: 1030; ԹՎ ՌԼ
- Assyrian calendar: 6331
- Balinese saka calendar: 1502–1503
- Bengali calendar: 987–988
- Berber calendar: 2531
- English Regnal year: 23 Eliz. 1 – 24 Eliz. 1
- Buddhist calendar: 2125
- Burmese calendar: 943
- Byzantine calendar: 7089–7090
- Chinese calendar: 庚辰年 (Metal Dragon); 4278 or 4071 — to — 辛巳年 (Metal Snake); 4279 or 4072
- Coptic calendar: 1297–1298
- Discordian calendar: 2747
- Ethiopian calendar: 1573–1574
- Hebrew calendar: 5341–5342
- Hindu calendars
- Vikram Samvat: 1637–1638
- Shaka Samvat: 1502–1503
- Kali Yuga: 4681–4682
- Holocene calendar: 11581
- Igbo calendar: 581–582
- Iranian calendar: 959–960
- Islamic calendar: 988–989
- Japanese calendar: Tenshō 9 (天正９年)
- Javanese calendar: 1500–1501
- Julian calendar: 1581; MDLXXXI
- Korean calendar: 3914
- Minguo calendar: 331 before ROC 民前331年
- Nanakshahi calendar: 113
- Thai solar calendar: 2123–2124
- Tibetan calendar: ལྕགས་ཕོ་འབྲུག་ལོ་ (male Iron-Dragon); 1707 or 1326 or 554 — to — ལྕགས་མོ་སྦྲུལ་ལོ་ (female Iron-Snake); 1708 or 1327 or 555

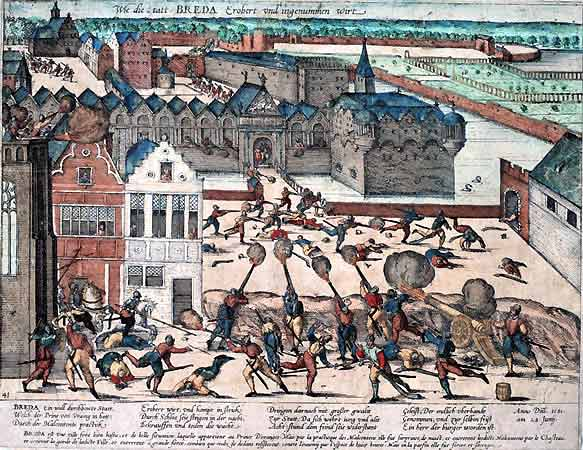
July 27–Spanish troops massacre more than 500 Dutch civilians during the Capture of Breda.

1581 (MDLXXXI) was a common year starting on Sunday in the Julian calendar, and a common year starting on Thursday (link will display full calendar) in the Proleptic Gregorian calendar.

== Events ==
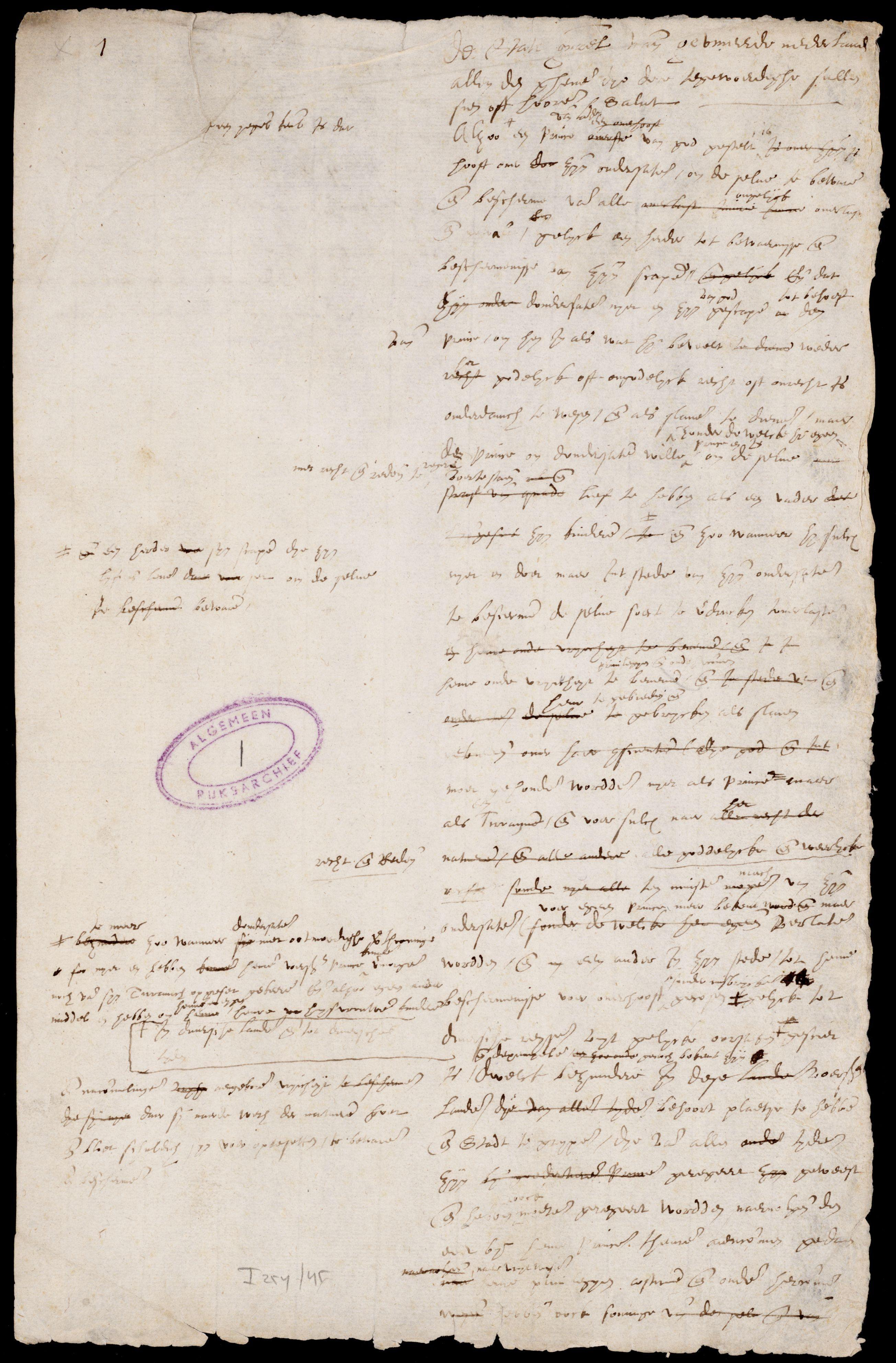
July 26: Netherlands nobles sign the Act of Abjuration to declare independence from Spain.

=== January–March ===
- January 11 – Chandrasen Rathore, ruler of the Kingdom of Marwar (now part of the state of Rajasthan in India) dies at the age of 39, leaving a power vacuum that allows the Mughal Empire to take control of the kingdom.
- January 14 – The Treaty of Drohiczyn is concluded, ending the Livonian War and adding the conquered city of Riga to the Polish-Lithuanian Commonwealth.
- January 23 – The Treaty of Plessis-les-Tours between the Duchy of Anjou and most of the states of the Dutch Republic is ratified at Bourdeaux, granting Francis, Duke of Anjou executive authority over the Republic with the title "Protector of the Liberty of the Netherlands".
- February 8 – (7th waxing of Tabaung 942 ME) Prince Shin Thissa, later to become King of Burma in 1599 as Nyaungyan Min, receives his first executive job when he is appointed to be Governor of Nyaungyan by his father, King Bayinnaung.
- February 23 – The Spanish Army is forced to abandon the siege of Steenwijk in the Netherlands after more than four months.
- March 18 – The Parliament of England's Act against Reconciliation to Rome imposes heavy fines, for practising Roman Catholicism.
- March 25 – Iberian Union: Philip II of Spain is crowned Philip I of Portugal.

=== April–June ===
- April 4 – Following his circumnavigation of the world, Francis Drake is knighted by Elizabeth I of England.
- May 15 – Zsigmond Báthory, the 8-year-old son of Kristóf Báthory, ruler of the Principality of Transylvania, is elected by the Diet of Transylvania as the new voivode at the request of Kristóf, who dies 12 days later.
- May 26 – (10th waning of Nayon 943 ME) In Burma, Thiri Thudhamma Yaza of Martaban becomes the new Viceroy of Martaban (now Mottama in the Mon State of Myanmar) after the demise of Minye Nandameit.
- June 2 – James Douglas, 4th Earl of Morton, the last regent for Scotland from 1572 to 1578 during the minority of King James VI, is beheaded at Edinburgh using the "Scottish Maiden", after being convicted of conspiracy in the 1567 murder of Henry Stuart, Lord Darnley, consort of Mary, Queen of Scots and father of King James.
- June 14 – The representatives of the States General of the Netherlands vote to declare that the throne of the Union of Utrecht is vacant because of the erratic behavior of King Philip II.

=== July–September ===
- July 11 – The Knights Hospitaller depose Jean de la Cassière as Grandmaster and appoint Mathurin Romegas in his place.
- July 14 – English Jesuit Edmund Campion is arrested.
- July 22 - At a meeting of the States General of the Union of Utrecht at Antwerp, the representatives vote to proclaim their independence from Spain in the Act of Abjuration, abjuring loyalty to Philip II of Spain as their sovereign, and appointing Francis, Duke of Anjou, as the new sovereign of the Netherlands; public practice of Roman Catholicism is forbidden.
- July 26
  - The Act of Abjuration is signed at The Hague by representatives of eight Dutch provinces as a declaration of independence from Spanish rule and a secession from the Union of Utrecht. The signing confirms a decision made in a July 22 meeting of the States General in Antwerp. King Philip II of Spain refuses to acknowledge the Abjuration.
  - A meteorite strikes the Earth in Thuringia in the Holy Roman Empire.
- July 27 – Capture of Breda: After a surprise attack the day before, Spanish troops under the command of Claude de Berlaymont, Lord of Haultepenne, take the walled city Breda in the Netherlands. Once inside the gates, the Spanish troops overcome the defenders and carry out the massacre of 584 citizens in the "Haultepenne Fury".
- August 28 – The army of King Stephen Báthory of Poland begins its siege of the Russian garrison of Pskov.
- September 6 – A mercenary army of Sweden, under Pontus De la Gardie, captures Narva from Russia.
- September 23 – Martín Enríquez de Almanza arrives in Lima and becomes the new Viceroy of Peru, replacing Francisco de Toledo, who was summoned home by King Philip II.
- September 30 – In Japan, warlord Oda Nobunaga invades the Iga Province. With 42,000 troops under his command against 10,000 defenders led by Takino Jurobei, Nobunaga controls most of central Japan within eight days.

=== October–December ===
- October 8 – The Tenshō Iga War ends in Japan with the surrender of Kashiwara Castle to Oda Nobunaga.
- October 10 – King Bayinnaung of Burma, who created the largest empire in mainland southeast Asia, dies at age 65.
- October 15 – Ballet Comique de la Reine, the first narrative ballet, devised by Louise of Lorraine, wife of Henry III of France, and choreographed by Balthasar de Beaujoyeulx, opens in its first performance at the court of Catherine de' Medici, in the Louvre Palace in Paris, as part of the wedding celebrations for Marguerite of Lorraine.
- November 4 – Jean de la Cassière is restored as Grandmaster of the Knights Hospitaller, by Pope Gregory XIII.
- December 1 – In England, Jesuit priest Edmund Campion is executed for treason.

=== Date unknown ===
- The Ming Dynasty Chancellor of China, Chief Grand Secretary Zhang Juzheng, imposes the Single Whip Reform, by which taxes are assessed on properties recorded in the land census, and paid in silver, as the accepted medium of exchange.
- The Trier witch trials begin.
- John Dee practices angel magic with Barnabas Saul, but with no success.
- Guru Arjan Dev becomes the fifth Guru of Sikhs, succeeding his father Guru Ram Das.
- The last Bishop of Meissen, John IX of Haugwitz, resigns his office in the wake of the Reformation.

== Births ==
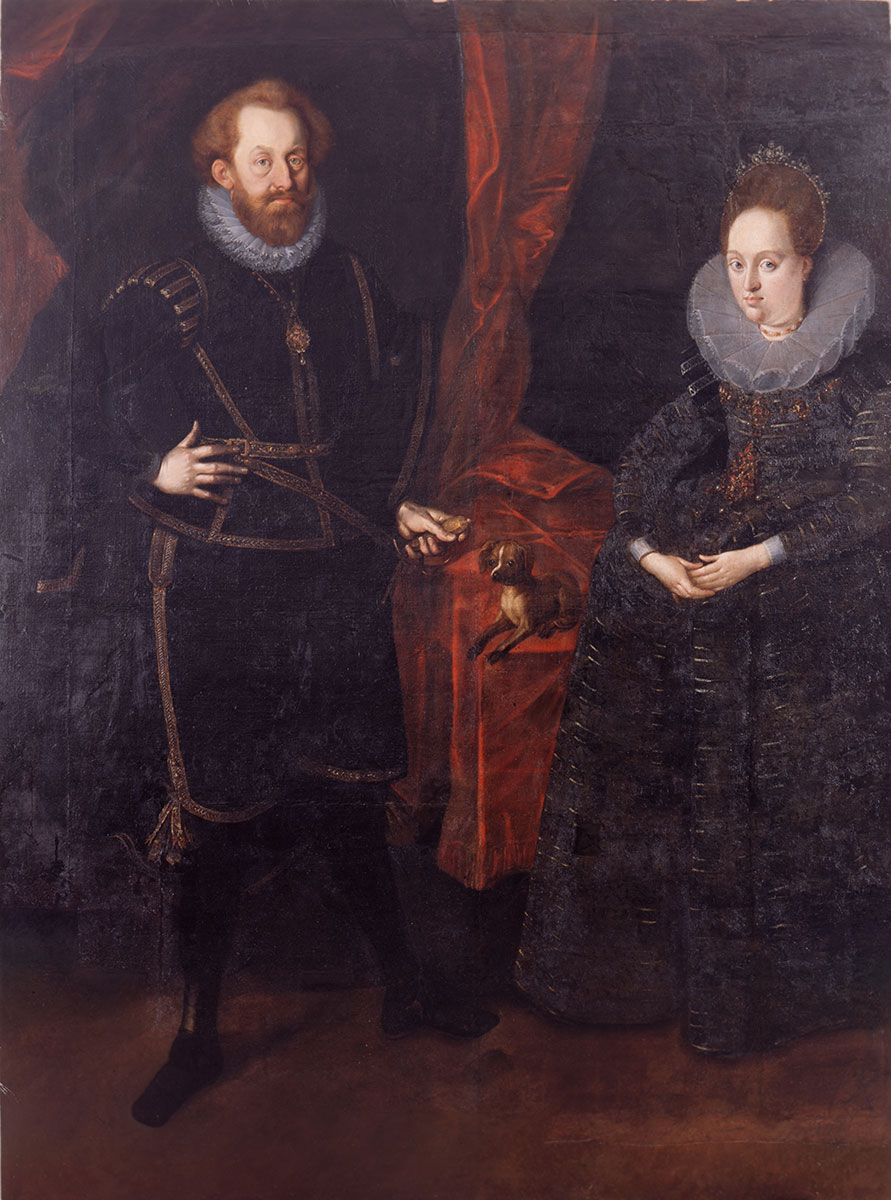
Countess Palatine Dorothea of Simmern

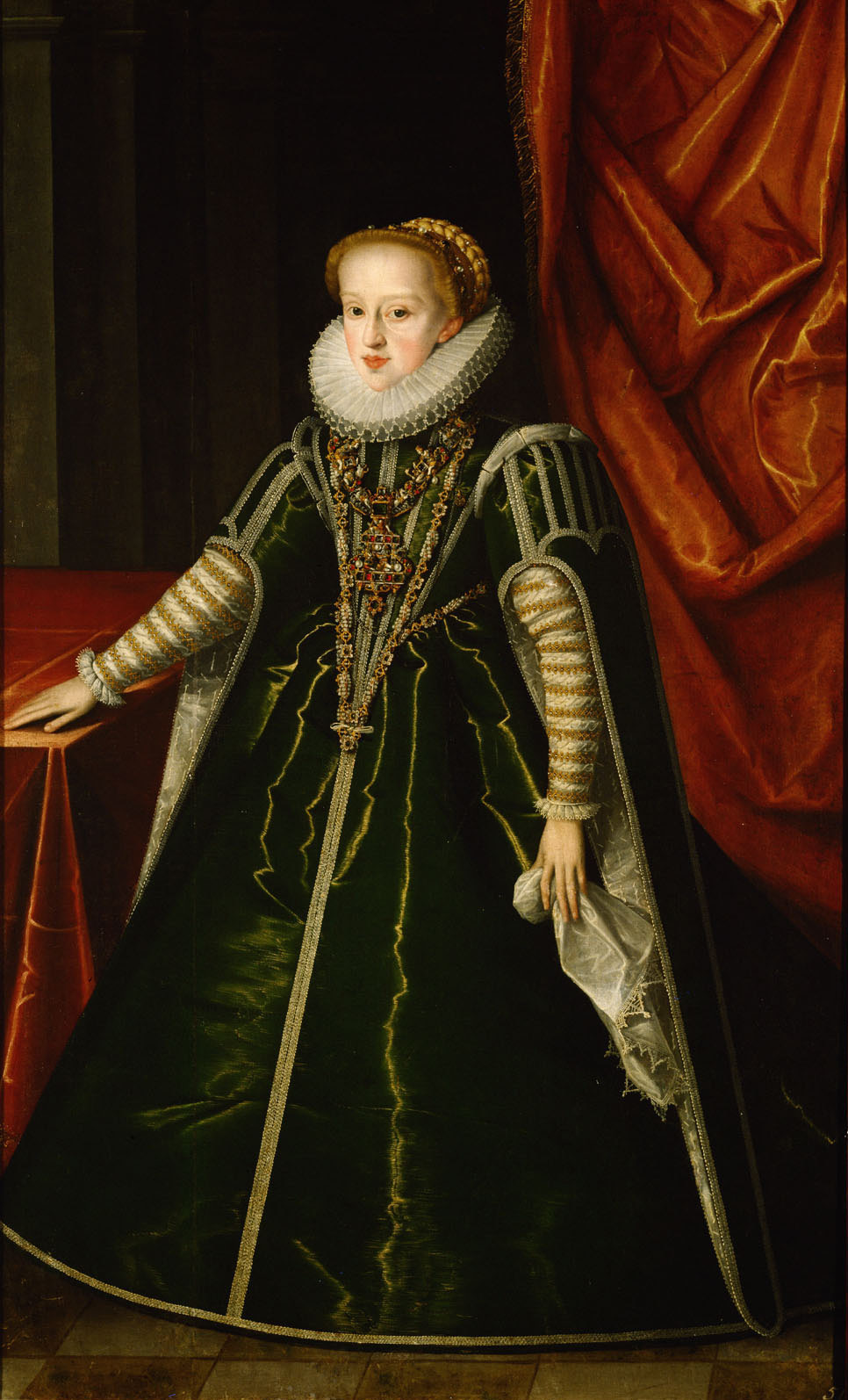
Archduchess Gregoria Maximiliana of Austria

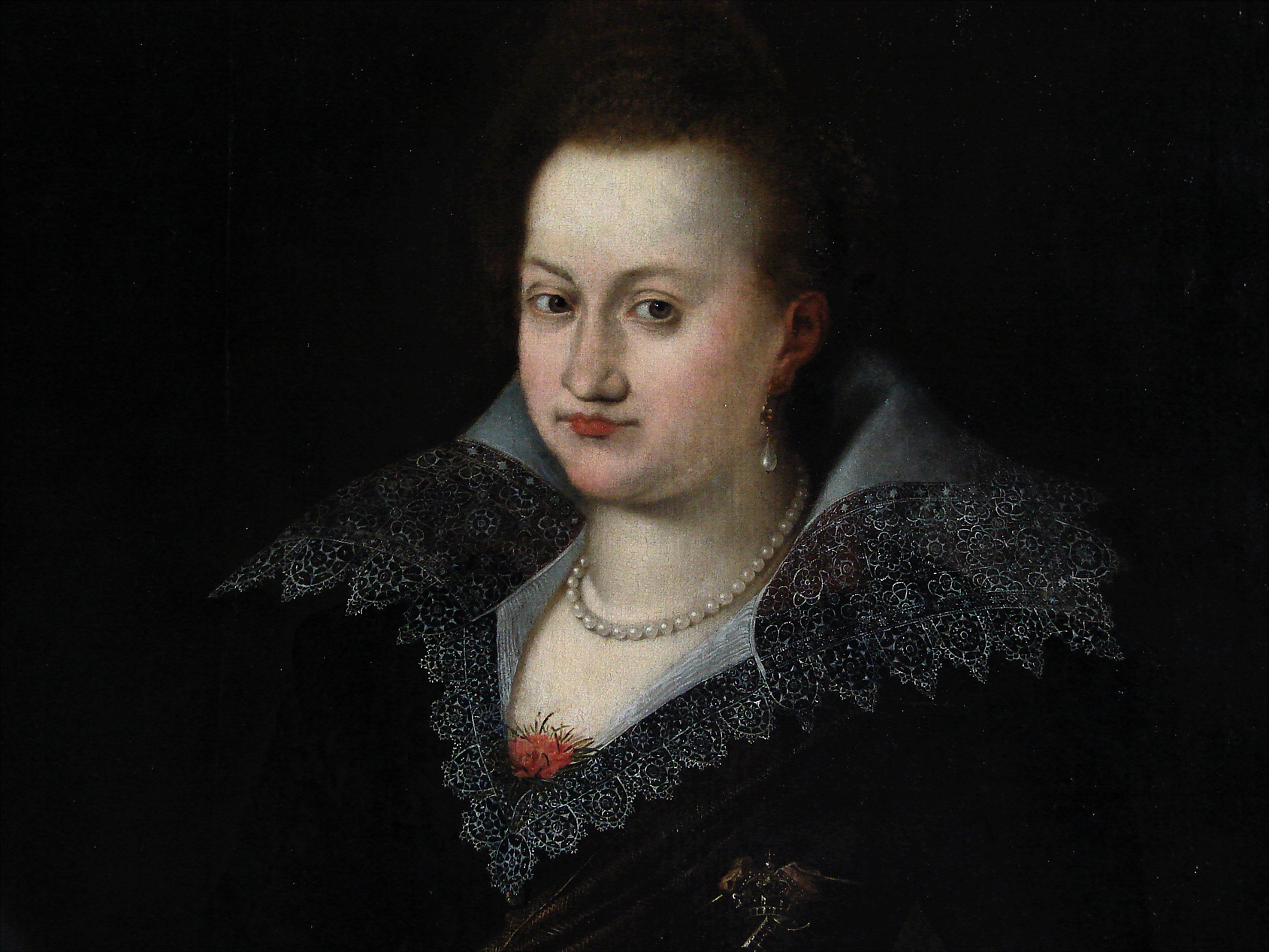
Princess Hedwig of Denmark

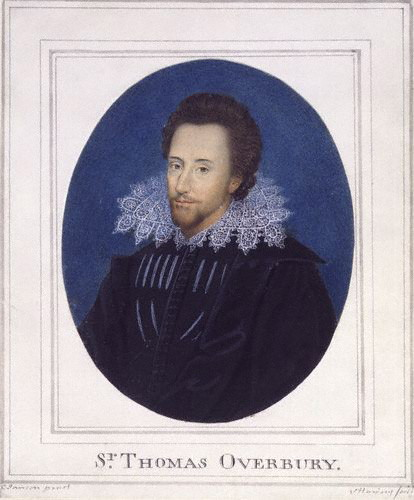
Thomas Overbury

- January 4 – James Ussher, Anglo-Irish priest and scholar (d. 1656)
- January 6 – Countess Palatine Dorothea of Simmern, Princess consort of Anhalt-Dessau (d. 1631)
- January 30 – Christian, Margrave of Brandenburg-Bayreuth (1603–1655) (d. 1655)
- February 17 – Fausto Poli, Italian Catholic prelate and cardinal (d. 1653)
- March 16 – Pieter Corneliszoon Hooft, Dutch historian (d. 1647)
- April 24 – Vincent de Paul, French Roman Catholic priest who dedicated himself to serving the poor (d. 1660)
- May 4 – Arnold Möller, German calligrapher (d. 1655)
- May 21 – Robert More, English politician (d. 1626)
- May 22 – Archduchess Gregoria Maximiliana of Austria, Austrian archduchess (d. 1597)
- June 21 – Edward Barrett, 1st Lord Barrett of Newburgh, English politician (d. 1645)
- June 27 – Louis Günther I of Schwarzburg-Rudolstadt (1630–1646) (d. 1646)
- July 18 – Pier Luigi Carafa, Italian Catholic cardinal (d. 1655)
- July 20 – Isidoro Bianchi, Italian painter (d. 1662)
- July 25 – Brian Twyne, English archivist (d. 1644)
- August 5 – Hedwig of Denmark, Danish princess (d. 1641)
- August 15 – Jeremias Drexel, Jesuit writer of devotional literature and a professor of the humanities and rhetoric (d. 1638)
- September 21 – Simon Archer, English politician (d. 1662)
- September 27 – Juan Damián López de Haro, Spanish Catholic bishop of Puerto Rico (d. 1648)
- October 9 – Claude Gaspard Bachet de Méziriac, French mathematician (d. 1638)
- October 21 – Domenico Zampieri, Italian painter (d. 1641)
- November 1 – William Hockmere, English politician (d. 1626)
- November 11 – Edward Popham, English politician (d. 1641)
- November 18 – Carlo I Cybo-Malaspina, marquisate of Massa (d. 1662)
- November 26 – Frederick, Duke of Schleswig-Holstein-Sønderburg-Norburg (d. 1658)
- December 17 – Walter Davison, English poet (d. 1600)
- December 26 – Philip III of Hesse-Butzbach (1609–1643) (d. 1643)
- December 27 – Jean Chalette, French painter (d. 1643)
- date unknown
  - Gasparo Aselli, Italian physician (d. 1626)
  - Jeremias Drexel, German Jesuit writer of devotional literature
  - Edmund Gunter, English mathematician (d. 1626)
  - Jean du Vergier de Hauranne, French monk who introduced Jansenism into France (d. 1643)
  - Charles Malapert, Belgian Jesuit writer (d. 1630)
  - Giulia Tofana, Italian poisoner (d. 1651)
  - Łukasz Opaliński (1581–1654), Polish nobleman (d. 1654)
  - Thomas Overbury, English poet and essayist (d. 1613)
  - Johannes Rudbeckius, bishop at Västerås (d. 1646)
  - Choghtu Khong Tayiji, ruler of the Khalkha Mongols (d. 1637)
- probable
  - Juan Ruiz de Alarcón, Mexican dramatist (d. 1639)
  - Sisto Badalocchio, Italian painter and engraver (d. 1647)

== Deaths ==
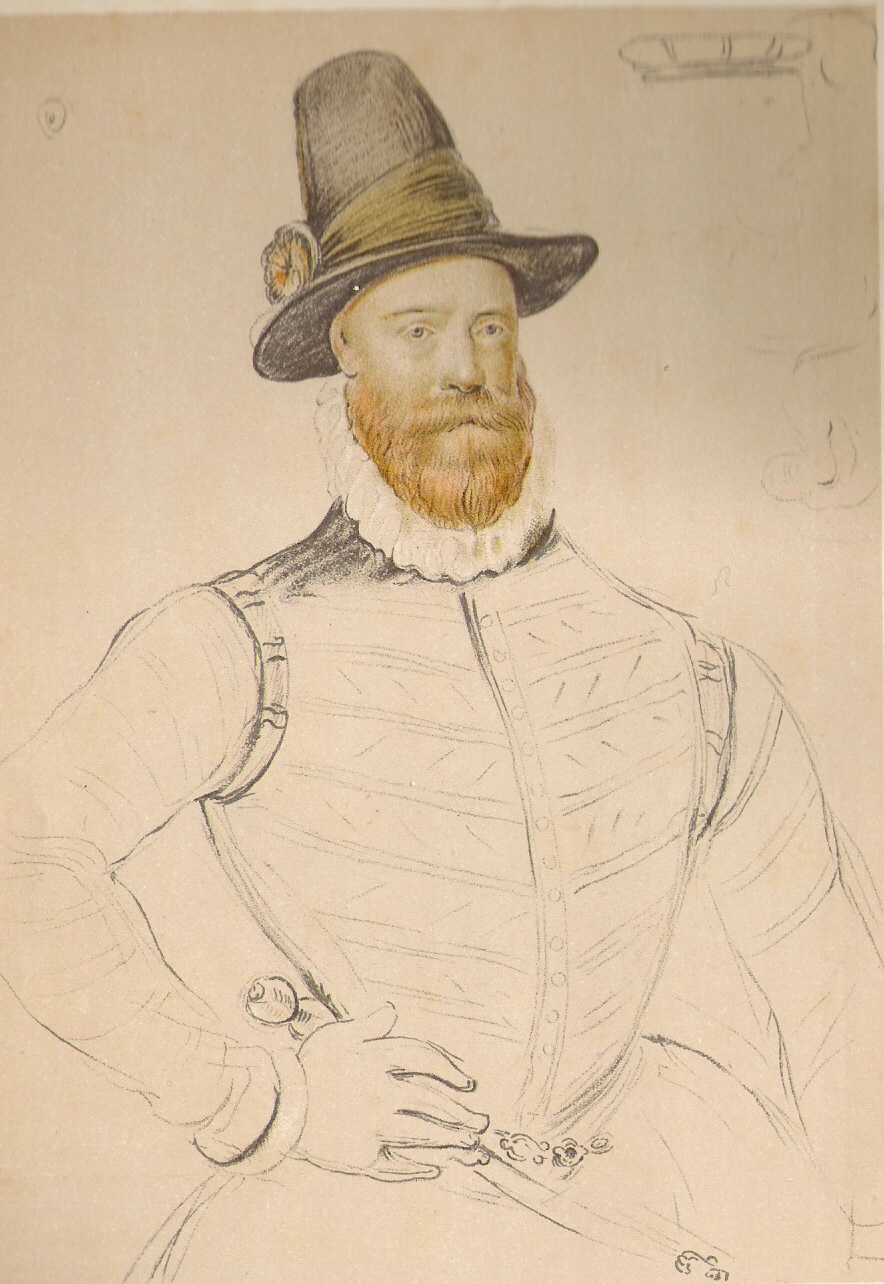
James Douglas

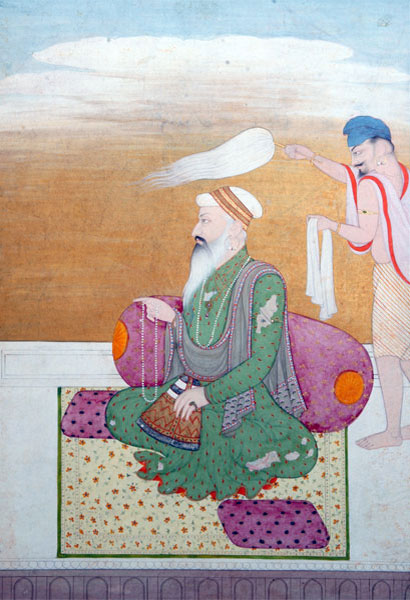
Guru Ram Das

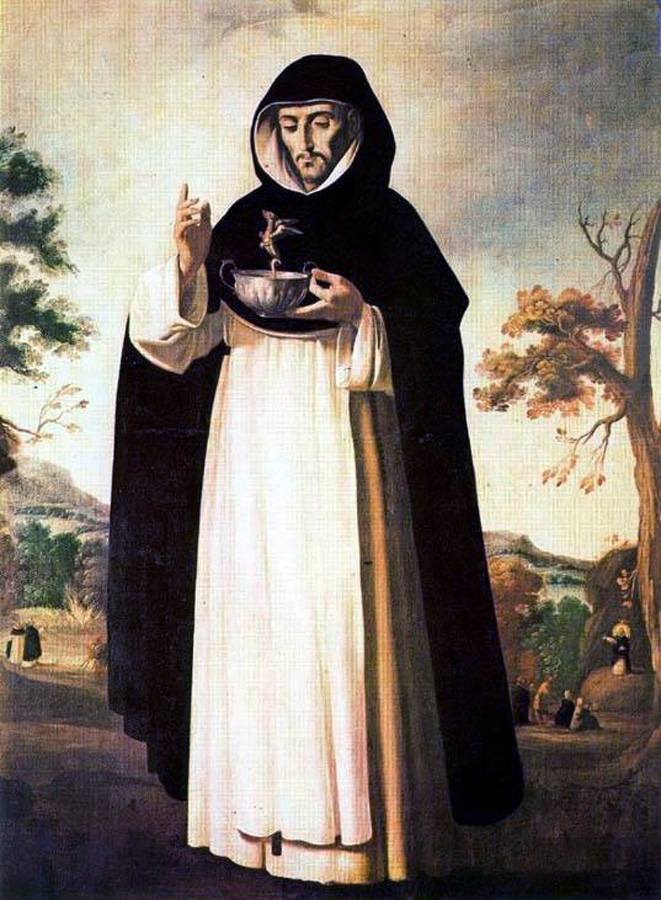
Saint Louis Bertrand

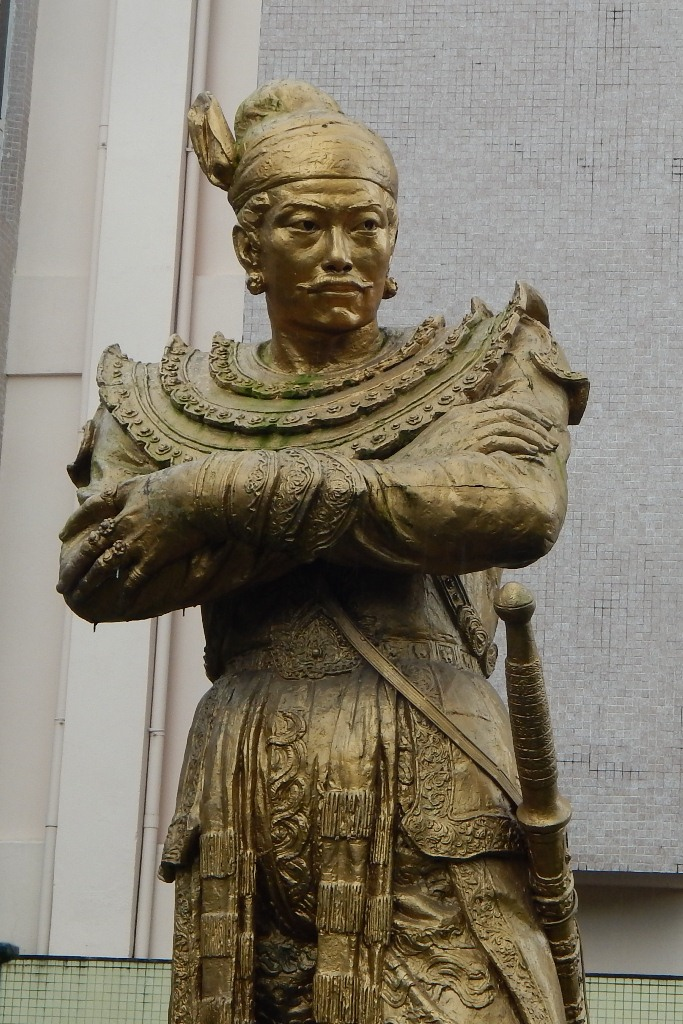
King Bayinnaung

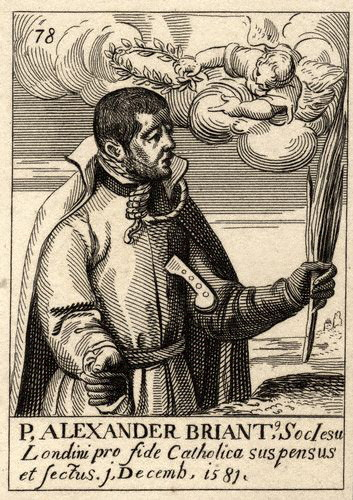
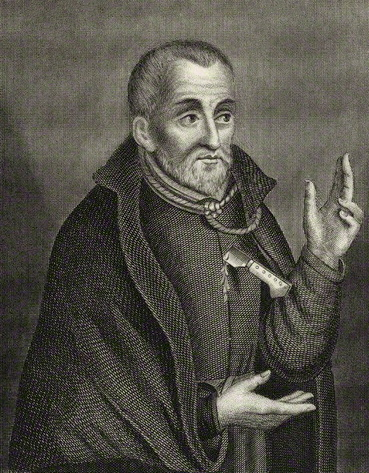
Saints Alexander Briant and Edmund Campion died on December 1, 1581
- January 22 – Joos de Damhouder, Flemish jurist (b. 1507)
- February 15 – Francisco Foreiro, Portuguese Dominican theologian and biblist (b. 1523)
- March 17 – Johann Marbach, German theologian (b. 1521)
- March 19 – Francis I, Duke of Saxe-Lauenburg (b. 1510)
- April 3 – Herbert Duifhuis, Dutch minister (b. 1531)
- April 25 – Okabe Motonobu, Japanese warrior
- May 31 – Jan Kostka, Polish noble (b. 1529)
- June 2 – James Douglas, 4th Earl of Morton, regent of Scotland (b. 1525)
- July 20 – Odet de Turnèbe, French dramatist (b. 1552)
- July 11 – Peder Skram, Danish senator and naval officer (b. 1500)
- July 12 – Johannes Gigas, German theologian (b. 1514)
- July 22 – Richard Cox, English bishop (b. 1500)
- August 17 – Duchess Sabine of Württemberg, by marriage Landgravine of Hesse-Kassel (b. 1549)
- August 20 – Katharina of Hanau, Countess of Wied, German noblewoman (b. 1525)
- August – King Mayadunne of Sitawaka (b. 1501)
- September 1 – Guru Ram Das, fourth Sikh Guru (b. 1534)
- September 16 – Peter Niers, notorious German bandit (date of birth unknown)
- September 28 – Achilles Statius, Portuguese humanist (b. 1524)
- September 29 – Andreas Musculus, German theologian (b. 1514)
- September 30 – Hubert Languet, French diplomat and reformer (b. 1518)
- October 4 – Henry Wriothesley, 2nd Earl of Southampton, English earl (b. 1545)
- October 7 – Honoré I, Lord of Monaco (b. 1522)
- October 9 – Saint Louis Bertrand, Spanish missionary to Latin America, patron saint of Colombia (b. 1526)
- October 10 – King Bayinnaung of Burma (b. 1516)
- October 23 – Michael Neander, German mathematician and astronomer (b. 1529)
- November 4 – Mathurin Romegas, French rival Grandmaster of the Knights Hospitaller (b. c.1525)
- November 7 – Richard Davies, Welsh bishop and scholar (b. c. 1505)
- November 19 – Tsarevich Ivan Ivanovich of Russia (b. 1554)
- December 1
  - Martyrs and executed of Tyburn
    - Alexander Briant, English Jesuit priest and saint (b. 1556)
    - Edmund Campion, English Jesuit priest and saint (b. 1540)
    - Ralph Sherwin, English Roman Catholic priest and saint (b. 1550)
- December 11 – Maria of Austria, Duchess of Jülich-Cleves-Berg, daughter of Emperor Ferdinand I (b. 1531)
- December 21 – Jean de la Cassière, French-born Maltese 51st Grandmaster of the Knights Hospitaller (b. 1502)
- date unknown
  - Christopher Báthory, prince of Transylvania (b. 1530)
  - Guillaume Postel, French linguist (b. 1510)
  - Agatha Streicher, German physician (b. 1520)
  - Nicholas Sanders, English Catholic propagandist (b. 1530)
