= Pierre de Monte =

Italian nobleman

Pietro del Monte
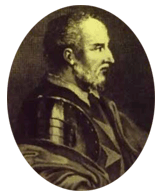

Grand Master of the Order of Saint John
- In office 23 August 1568 – 26 January 1572
- Monarch: King Philip I
- Preceded by: Jean Parisot de Valette
- Succeeded by: Jean de la Cassière

Personal details
- Born: 1499 Italy
- Died: 26 January 1572 (aged 73) Malta
- Resting place: St. John's Co-Cathedral

Military service
- Allegiance: (Sovereign Military Order of Malta) Order of Saint John
- Commands: Fort Saint Michael
- Battles/wars: Siege of Rhodes; Great Siege of Malta

Fra' Pietro del Monte (1499 − 26 January 1572) was an Italian nobleman who was the 50th Grand Master of the Order of Saint John from 1568 to 1572.

== Biography ==
Pietro del Monte was born in Italy in 1499. His original name was Guido Lotti, but took the name San Savino del Monti in 1550. He was a nephew of Pope Julius III. Prior to his arrival in Malta he was a friar in Capua. He also fought in the siege of Rhodes of 1522.

During the Great Siege of Malta of 1565, del Monte was in command of Fort Saint Michael in Senglea. For most of the siege, the fort was cut off from the bulk of the Order's forces in Birgu. Del Monte managed to hold the fort for 55 days until the arrival of de Toledo's relief force on 8 September.

Del Monte was appointed as Grand Master on 23 August 1568, three days after the death of his predecessor Jean Parisot de Valette, after whom the Malta capital is named. During his rule as Grand Master, del Ponte continued the construction of the new capital Valletta. In 1569, he built Del Monte Gate to a design by Francesco Laparelli. This gate was demolished by the British in 1884 to make way for the larger Victoria Gate. The Order officially moved to the city of Valletta during del Monte's reign, on 18 March 1571.

The Order's fleet was also strengthened during his reign, and took part in the victorious Battle of Lepanto on 7 October 1571.

Del Monte died on 26 January 1572 and was succeeded by Jean de la Cassière.

Preceded by Jean Parisot de Valette	Grand Master of the Knights Hospitaller; 1568–1572	Succeeded by Jean de la Cassière
