= Grand Harbour of Malta tornado =

Disastrous tornado in 1551

Grand Harbour tornado
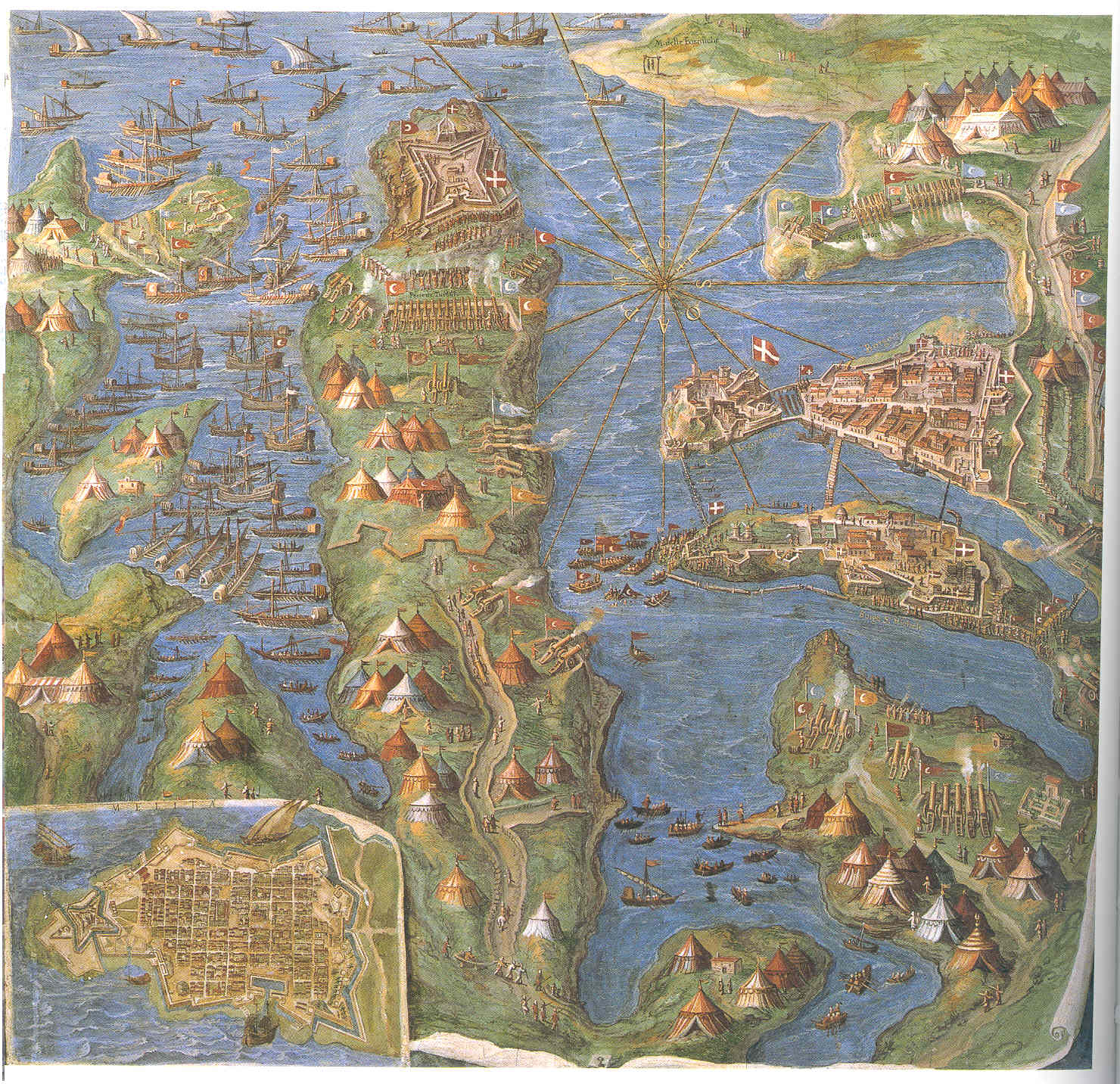
- The Grand Harbour as it looked in the siege of 1565

Meteorological history
- Formed: 23 September 1551 or 23 September 1556 (sources conflict)

F3 tornado
- on the Fujita scale

Overall effects
- Fatalities: 600 fatalities (estimated)
- Areas affected: Grand Harbour, Malta

The Grand Harbour of Malta tornado was a tornado in Malta, killing at least 600 people. It supposedly began as a waterspout, hitting the Grand Harbour of Malta where it killed hundreds of people who drowned when their ships capsized. At least four of the Order's galleys, named Santa Fè, San Michele, San Filippo and San Claudio, capsized in the tornado. The date of the tornado is unknown, as sources vary between 23 September 1551 or 23 September 1556. TORRO indicates a rating of T7 on the TORRO scale, equivalent to F3 on the Fujita scale.

Maltese naval commander Mathurin Romegas was present and got trapped for hours under one of the capsized galleys, but survived with only neurological damage.

== See also ==
- List of tornadoes and tornado outbreaks
- List of European tornadoes and tornado outbreaks
