= Portrait of Vincenzo Anastagi =

Painting by El Greco

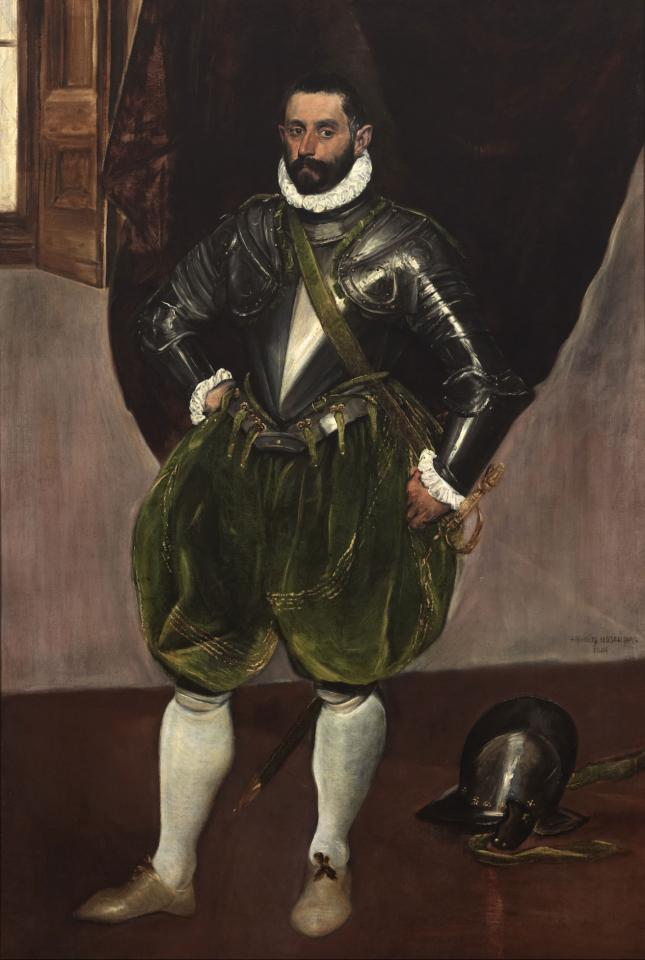
- Artist: El Greco
- Year: 1571–1576
- Medium: oil on canvas
- Dimensions: 188 cm × 126.7 cm (74 in × 49.9 in)
- Location: Frick Collection; New York

The Portrait of Vincenzo Anastagi is a portrait of Vincenzo Anastagi by El Greco, probably painted between 1571 and 1576, during the artist's time in Rome.

It is part of the Frick Collection, which acquired it in 1913.

== See also ==
- List of works by El Greco
