= Vincenzo Anastagi =

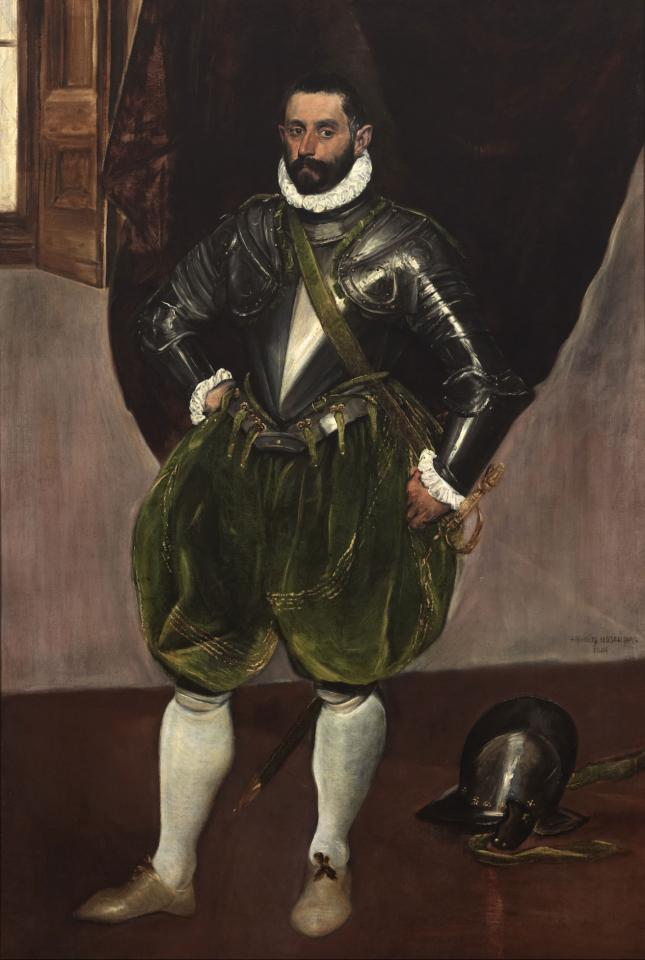
Portrait of Vincenzo Anastagi by El Greco

Vincenzo Anastagi (died 1585) was an Italian Knight of Rhodes who participated in the Siege of Malta (1565). He had joined the Knights two years before the siege.

Sallying with about a hundred cavalry from Mdina, he led a surprise cavalry charge against the poorly guarded Turkish camp on August 7, while the main Turkish force was engaged in an assault on Birgu and Senglea. The assault would have likely succeeded were it not for the intervention of Anastagi's cavalry that created a confusion in the Turkish rear.

In the words of a modern historian: "Malta survived on 7 August purely through Anastagi's lucky strike".

In 1585 he was nominated as Captain of the Galera Capitana, but then murdered by two fellow knights. His final resting place is in Venice Italy.

His portrait was painted by El Greco sometime between 1571 and 1576.
