= Arnold Möller =

German calligrapher

- Born: 4 May 1581
- Died: 14 October 1655; Lübeck
- Known for: Calligraphy
- Notable work: Calligraphic works and magic square puzzles in St. Catherine's Church, Lübeck

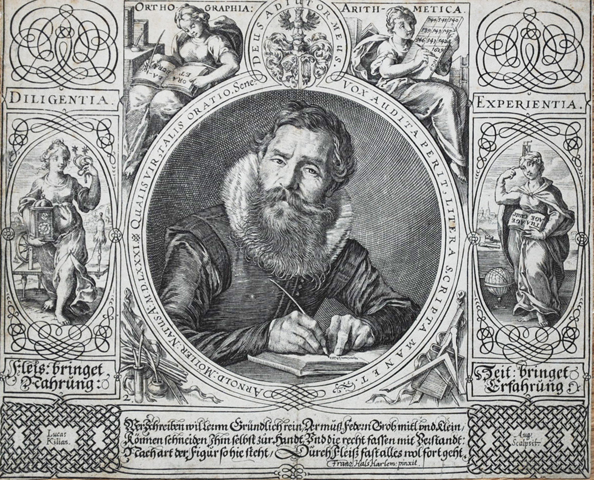
Portrait after a painting by Frans Hals, of the calligrapher Arnold Moller with an example of his work, by Lucas Kilian, 1629

Arnold Möller (4 May 1581 – 14 October 1655), was a German calligrapher.

== Biography ==
Möller was a 17th-century German writing and arithmetic teacher who worked as a calligrapher in Lübeck. His publications were still reissued in the 18th century. He was trained in the Netherlands, possibly by Jan van de Velde the Elder in Haarlem, since his portrait was painted by the Haarlem artist Frans Hals. Möller is remembered today for his calligraphy and magic square puzzles left in the St. Catherine's Church, Lübeck, where he is buried. His numerous works are in the Archives of the Hanseatic city of Lübeck and the city library.
