= Mathurin Romegas =

Grand Master of the Knights Hospitaller

de facto Grand Master of the Order of Saint John
- In office 11 July 1581 – October 1581
- Monarch: King Philip I
- Preceded by: Jean de la Cassière
- Succeeded by: Jean de la Cassière

Personal details
- Born: 1525 or 1528
- Died: 4 November 1581 Rome

Military service
- Allegiance: (Sovereign Military Order of Malta) Order of Saint John
- Years of service: 1546–1581
- Battles/wars: Great Siege of Malta; Battle of Lepanto

Mathurin d’Aux de Lescout, called Mathurin Romegas (1525 or 1528 – November 1581 in Rome), was a scion of the aristocratic Gascony family of d'Aux and a member of the Knights of Saint John. He was one of the order's greatest naval commanders and an acting Grand Master.

== Early life ==
He was born to a French noble family with connections to the House of Armagnac. In 1542 he joined the Knights Hospitaller and became a full knight some four years later after completing his military and religious studies. He quickly made a name for himself as a good fighter with incredible stamina.

== Early career ==
He became a knight of the Order in December 1546 and served most of his life commanding its galleys. He soon became the terror of Muslims on the waters and shores of the Mediterranean, continually raiding along the Barbary Coast, the Levant and the Aegean Sea and capturing numerous ships and slaves. At the request of the Pope he even waged a short, but vicious campaign against the Protestant Huguenot forces in parts of southern France.

He first gained fame by virtue of a seemingly miraculous escape from a shipwreck in 1555. His galley was capsized during a violent storm in a harbor of Malta. When the storm had passed, knocking was heard from inside the overturned vessel. A hole was punched into its bottom and from it emerged Romegas, with his pet monkey, having somehow managed to stand for hours up to his chest in water in an air bubble under the keel of the ship. Grand Master de Valette witnessed the event and remained a close friend of Romegas' for the remainder of his life.

== Naval Exploits ==
Serving with the Order's General of the Galleys, Gozon de Melac, Romegas battled repeatedly with the galleys of Turgut Reis, participated in the conquest of the Peñón de Vélez de la Gomera in 1564, on the North African coast opposite Malaga, a major stronghold of the Barbary Pirates, and enraged the Ottoman emperor Suleiman.

Shortly after the capture of the Penon de Velez, several Maltese galleys, under Romegas and de Giou, attacked and after a very bloody battle captured a large and heavily armed Ottoman galleon, under the command of Bairan Ogli Reis and with 200 Janissaries on board, near Kefalonia. The owner of the ship was Kustir Agha, the chief eunuch of the Sultan's Seraglio, and the merchandise it carried, valued at about 80,000 ducats, was his and that of a number of the sultan's ladies, including his favorite daughter. Among the prisoners they took were the governor of Cairo, the governor of Alexandria, and the former nurse of Suleiman's daughter.

This event led Suleiman the Magnificent to mobilize the great force that landed on Malta on 18 May 1565 to begin the Great Siege of Malta. During the siege itself, Romegas played a prominent part, leading several thousand knights and soldiers in the defense of the Great Harbor. When the siege ended, he immediately returned to raiding Muslim shipping, continuing to build his reputation as a fearless warrior and defender of Christendom.

At the Battle of Lepanto in 1571, Romegas served on the Papal flagship under the command of admiral Marcantonio Colonna. Romegas was the superintendent of the papal galleys. He again fought with distinction and after the battle was invited by Colonna to join him in Rome to celebrate the victory.

In 1575 Romegas was appointed General of the Order's Galleys and soon afterwards Grand Prior of Toulouse. In 1577 he was elected Lieutenant to the Grand Master. With his record of valor and success, he seemed destined to be elected Grand Master in due course, but he was eventually tripped up by the intrigues and machinations of several senior members of the Order who sought to use his prestige and influence for their own ends.

== Rival Grand Master ==
Much resentment had built up within the Order and in the General Convent against Grand Master Jean de la Cassiere over a series of perceived humiliations suffered by the Order during his rule. In 1581, this led to a virtual mutiny, when the General Convent deposed La Cassiere and placed him in confinement in Fort St. Angelo, making Romegas the de facto Grand Master. The Pope sent a special envoy, Gaspare Visconti, to investigate and, simultaneously, to administer the Order until the dispute could be settled.

La Cassiere and Romegas were both summoned to Rome to explain their conduct and plead their case. La Cassiere arrived in Rome on 26 October 1581 and, on orders of Pope Gregory XIII, was treated with much deference and ceremony. By contrast, Romegas was treated with extreme coldness and much disdain. He died, alone and with broken spirit, within a week, on 4 November 1581.

La Cassiere was honorably acquitted of all charges against him and restored to the position of Grand Master. He did not live long enough, however, to enjoy his triumph, dying in Rome on 21 December 1581.

Preceded by Jean de la Cassière	Grand Master of the Knights Hospitaller (disputed); 1581	Succeeded by Jean de la Cassière
