= Jeremias Drexel =

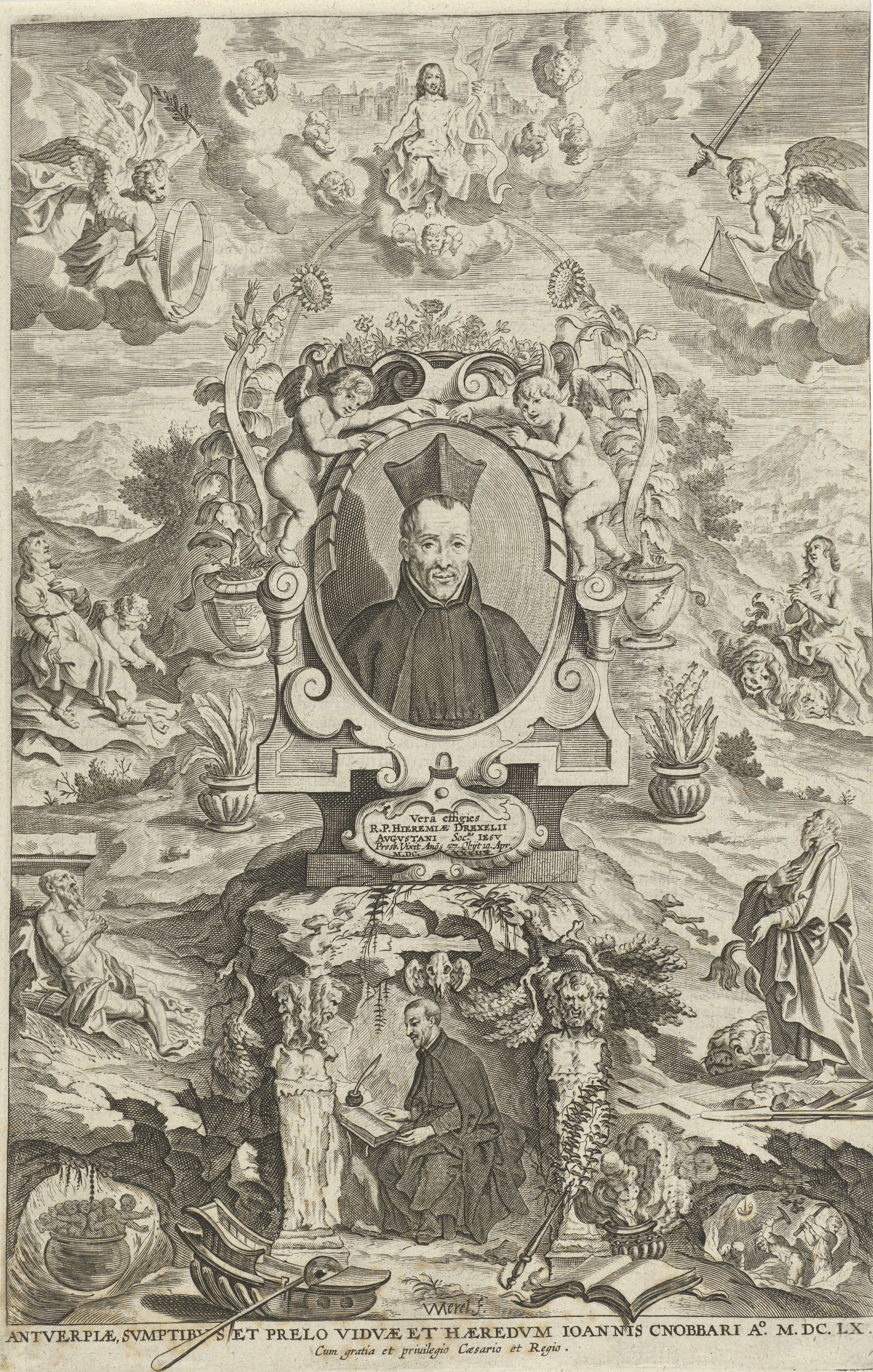
Portrait of Jeremias Drexel, S.J.

Jeremias Drexel, S.J. (also known as Hieremias Drexelius or Drechsel) (15 August 1581–19 April 1638) was a Jesuit writer of devotional literature and a professor of the humanities and rhetoric. He served for 23 years as court preacher in Munich to Maximilian I, Elector of Bavaria and his wife Elizabeth of Lorraine.

== Life ==
Jeremias Drexel was born in Augsburg and was raised as Lutheran. However, he converted to Catholicism in his youth and was educated by the Jesuits before entering the Jesuit Order. He taught the Jesuit seminarians at Dillingen as professor of rhetoric, and then for 23 years he was a court preacher to Maximilian I, the prince-elector of Bavaria in the Holy Roman Empire. It is said that his voice was strong enough to be heard in every corner of the church and that his sermons were such that an hour would seem like a few minutes. During this period he accompanied Maximilian on his Bohemian campaign. He died in Munich.

== Works ==
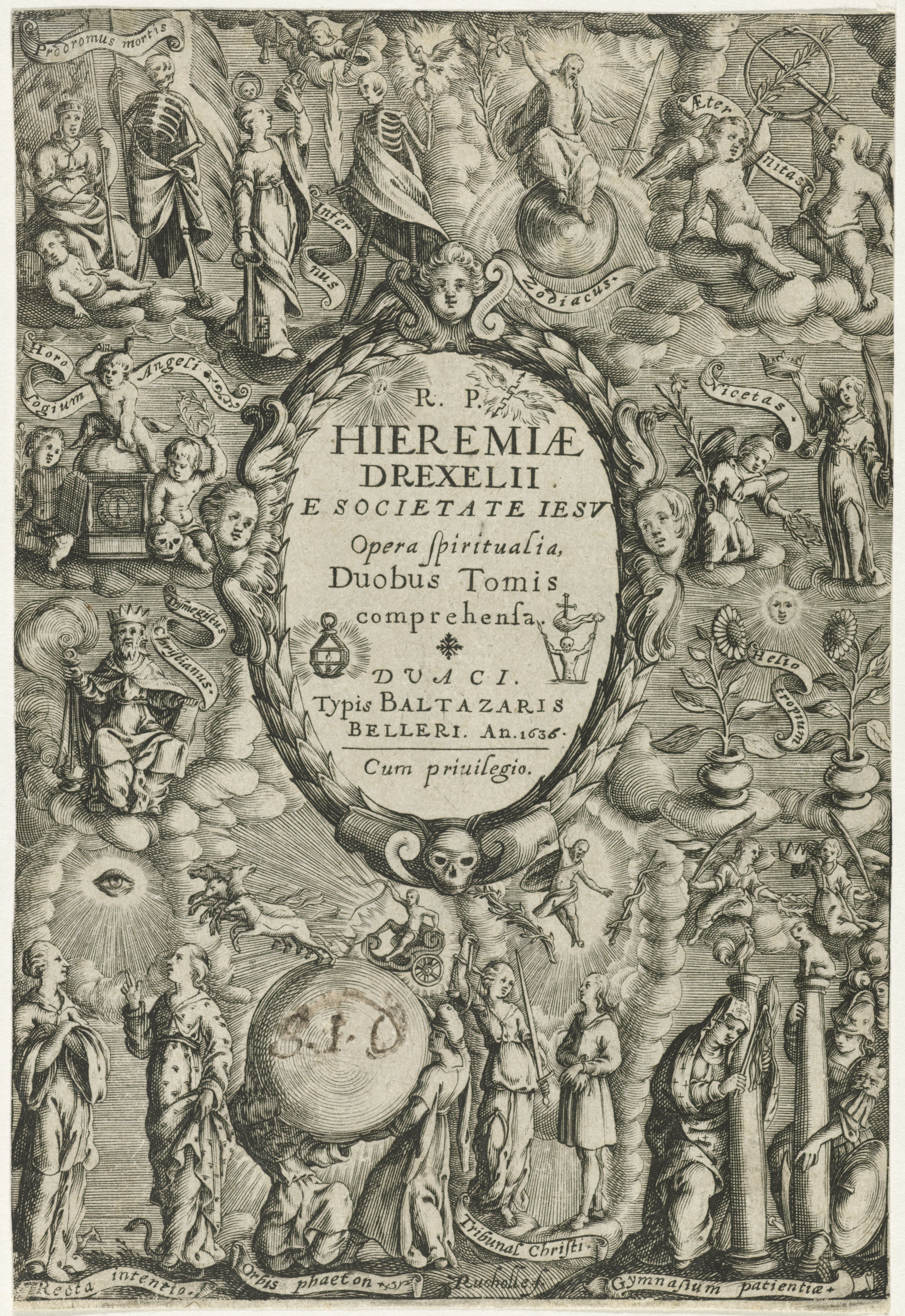
Jeremias Drexel, Opera Spiritualia, 1636.

Drexel gave up preaching in 1621 and devoted himself to writing a biography of the Duchess and composing theological works redolent of his baroque preaching fervor. Drexel was fond of pictorial symbols to make his teachings concrete and thus most of his books are elegantly illustrated. Jeremias is the author of some 20 works that were widely read and translated. His writings on the eternal truth, the virtues and the Christian exemplar were popular; hundreds of thousands of copies of his works were printed. By 1642 in Munich alone, 170,700 copies of his works had appeared. His first work, De aeternitate considerationes, concerned various representations of eternity. Another of his works, Heliotropium, discussed man's recognition of the divine will and conformity to it.

=== Bibliography ===
- 1620 De æternitate considerationes (Considerations on Eternity). Munich.
- 1623 Infernus damnatorum carcer et rogus.
- 1624 Cultus tutelaris angeli, ex horologio. (Translated anonymously in 1630: The Angel-Guardian's Clock (reprinted in English Recusant Literature, vol. 298)).
- 1627 Heliotropium or "Conformity of the Human Will with the Divine Will", (Later edition 1634 Cologne).
- 1628 Aeternitatis prodromus, mortis nuntius, quem sanis, aegrotis, moribundis sistit Hieremias Drexelius.
- 1630 Gymnasium Patientae ("The School of Patience").
- 1631 Trismegistus christianus, seu Triplex cultus conscientiae, caelitum, corporis.
- 1626 Nicetas, seu Triumphata incontinentia.
- 1631 Orbis Phaëthon, hoc est de Universis vitiis linguae, libro de emblemas y vicios universales del lenguaje.1.
- 1632 Jeremias Drexel, The Considerations of Drexelius upon Eternitie, Nicholas Alsop (Further editions 1636, 1658, 1661, 1672, 1694).
- 1633 Jeremias Drexel, The Christian Zodiac, John Coustourier, Rouen (Second edition 1647).
- 1633 Jeremias Drexel, Nicetas or the Triumph over Incontinencie, ?Rouen or ?Douai.
- 1636 Caelum, beatorum civitas aeternitatis, pars III.
- 1636 Recta Intentio: Omnium humanarum actionum Amvssis Auctore Hieremia Drexelio e Societate Iesu. Monachii: Formis Cornelii Leyserii, 1636. 668 p.
- 1638 Aloe amari sed salubris succi jejunium, quod... latine scripsit Hieremias Drexelius.
- 1640 Noe, architectus arcae in diluvio navarchus descriptus, et morali doctrina illustratus
- 1641 Aurifodina artium et scientiarum omnium, excerpendi solertia.
- 1641 Daniel, Prophetarum Princeps (print post mortem).
- 1641 Joseph Aegypti Prorex.
- 1655 Antigrapheus, sive Conscientia hominis.
- 1643 Hieremia Drexel, David Regio Psaltes, Munich.

== Sources ==
- Roger Paultre, Les Images du livre (Paris: Hermann, 1991), p. 185.
