= Jean de la Cassière =

Grand Master of the Order of Malta (1502–1581)

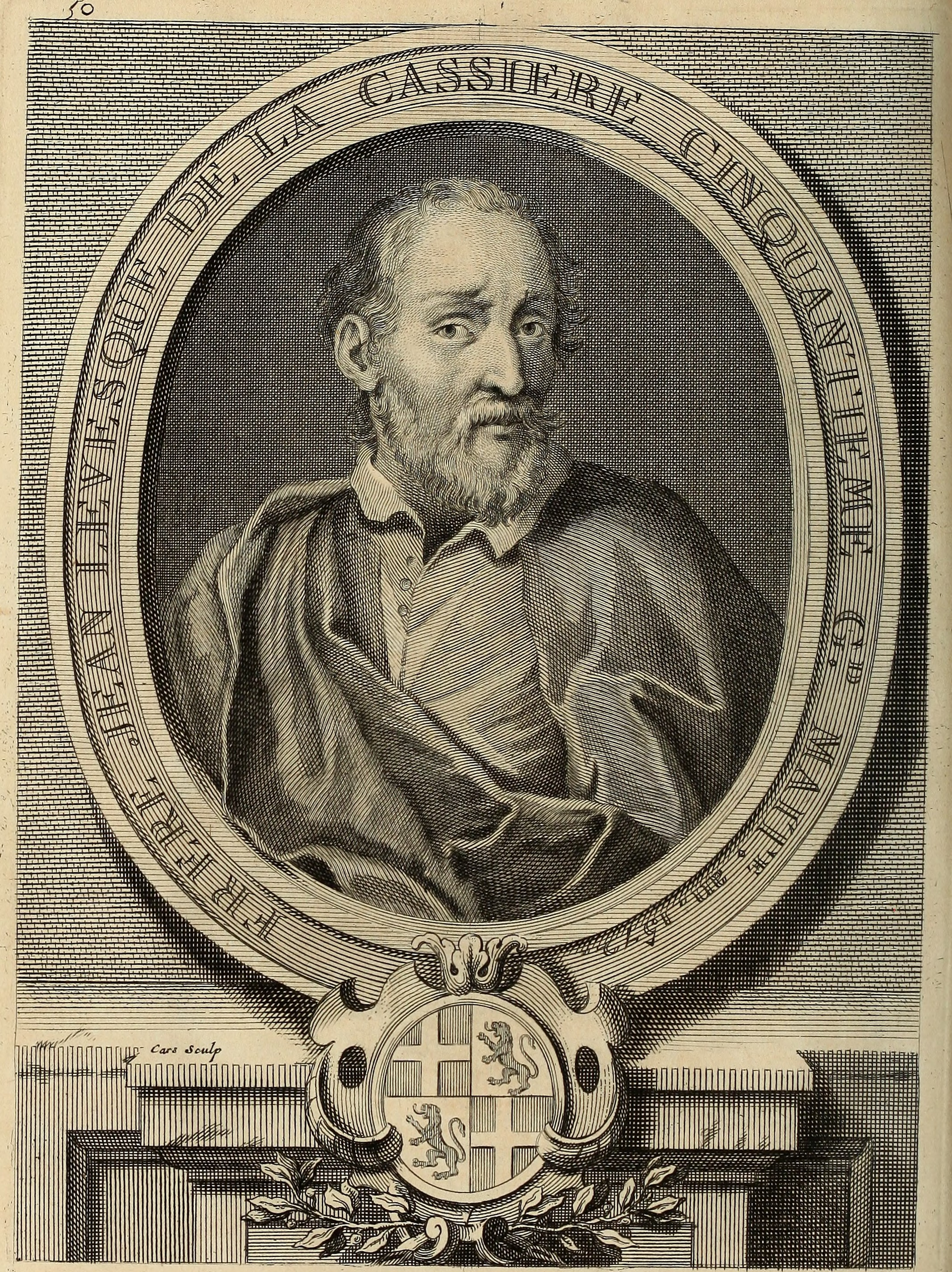

Grand Master of the Order of Saint John
- In office 30 January 1572 – 11 July 1581
- Monarch: King Philip I
- Preceded by: Pietro del Monte
- Succeeded by: Mathurin Romegas (de facto)
- In office October – 21 December 1581
- Preceded by: Mathurin Romegas (de facto)
- Succeeded by: Hugues Loubenx de Verdalle

Personal details
- Born: 1502 Auvergne, France
- Died: 21 December 1581 (aged 78–79) Rome, Papal States
- Resting place: St. John's Co-Cathedral

Military service
- Allegiance: (Sovereign Military Order of Malta) Order of Saint John
- Battles/wars: Great Siege of Malta

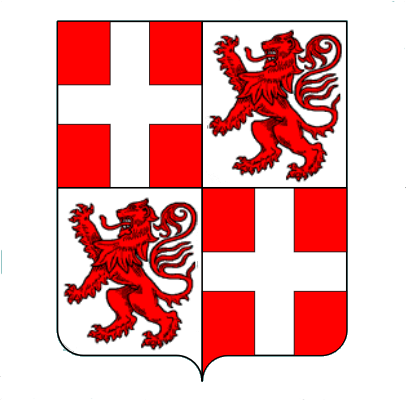
La Cassière's coat of arms

Fra' Jean l'Evesque de la Cassière (1502 – 21 December 1581) was the 51st Grand Master of the Order of Malta, from 1572 to 1581. He commissioned the building of the Conventual Church of the Order (now Saint John's Co-Cathedral) in Valletta, Malta, and is buried in its crypt.

== Biography ==
La Cassière had earned acclaim for his bravery in the battle of Zoara in Northern Africa where he had saved the colours of the Order. He was Grand Prior of the Order's Langue of Auvergne when he was elected on 30 January 1572 to succeed Pierre de Monte as Grand Master.

The early years of his reign as Grand Master were marked by numerous disputes and quarrels between the Order and Bishop of Malta Martín Royas de Portalrubio over the latter's ecclesiastical jurisdiction. These disputes were unprecedented in the history of the Order since it had arrived in Malta in 1530 with a grant of virtual sovereignty from Emperor Charles V. La Cassière was unable to resolve the matter, which was finally submitted to Pope Gregory XIII who in turn appointed Pietro Dusina as Inquisitor, a step that La Cassière initially supported but later ended up causing resentment within the Order.

A second major conflict arose in 1575 with the Republic of Venice, when Hospitaller galleys seized a Venetian ship that carried goods for Jewish owners. Venice was outraged, and the Order soon faced the threat of having all of its property on Venetian territory confiscated. Again it required the intervention of the Pope, as well as the payment by La Cassière of complete compensation, to resolve the dispute. And again, there was much discontent among the knights over this perceived rebuke to their assumed right to confiscate any property of non-Christians.

The third and most serious cause of discord within the Order during La Cassière's rule was triggered by King Philip II of Spain who managed to arrange the appointment of one of his close relatives, 17-year-old Archduke Wenzel (Wenceslaus) of Austria (son of Emperor Maximilan II, Philip's cousin), to the Grand Priory of Castile and Leon and the Bailiwick of Lora. Outraged by the king's interference, the Castilian knights of the Order openly rebelled against this appointment. In response, the Pope ordered them to apologize publicly before the Grand Master and the General Convent for this insubordination.

These events further fuelled resentment within the Order and the General Convent against La Cassière, who was widely perceived to be the cause of these problems and humiliations. It eventually broke into virtual mutiny on 11 July 1581, when the Convent deposed La Cassière and placed him in confinement in Fort St. Angelo. This meant that Mathurin Romegas, former Grand Prior of Toulouse and the Order's most celebrated naval hero, who had been elected Lieutenant to the Grand Master in 1577, was now the de facto Grand Master.

The Pope immediately sent a special envoy, Gaspare Visconti, to investigate and, simultaneously, to administer the Order until the dispute could be settled. La Cassière and Romegas were both summoned to Rome to explain their conduct and plead their case. La Cassière arrived in Rome on 26 October 1581 and, on orders of Pope Gregory XIII, was treated with much deference and ceremony. By contrast, Romegas was treated with extreme coldness and much disdain. He died, alone and with broken spirit, within a week, on 4 November 1581. La Cassière was honorably acquitted of all charges against him and restored to the position of Grand Master. He did not live long enough, however, to enjoy his triumph, dying in Rome on 21 December 1581 at the age of seventy-eight. His body was transferred to Malta and buried in St. John's Co-Cathedral in Valletta.

== Literature ==
Jean de la Cassière and the Battle of Zoara are featured in Falcon's Shadow: A Novel of the Knights of Malta by Marthese Fenech (BDL Publishing, 2020, ISBN 978-9918210442) the second novel in Fenech's Siege of Malta trilogy.

Preceded by Pierre de Monte	Grand Master of the Knights Hospitaller; 1572–1581	Succeeded by Hugues Loubenx de Verdalle
