= Great Siege of Malta =

Ottoman Empire's invasion of Malta in 1565

- Part of the Spanish–Ottoman wars and the Ottoman–Habsburg wars
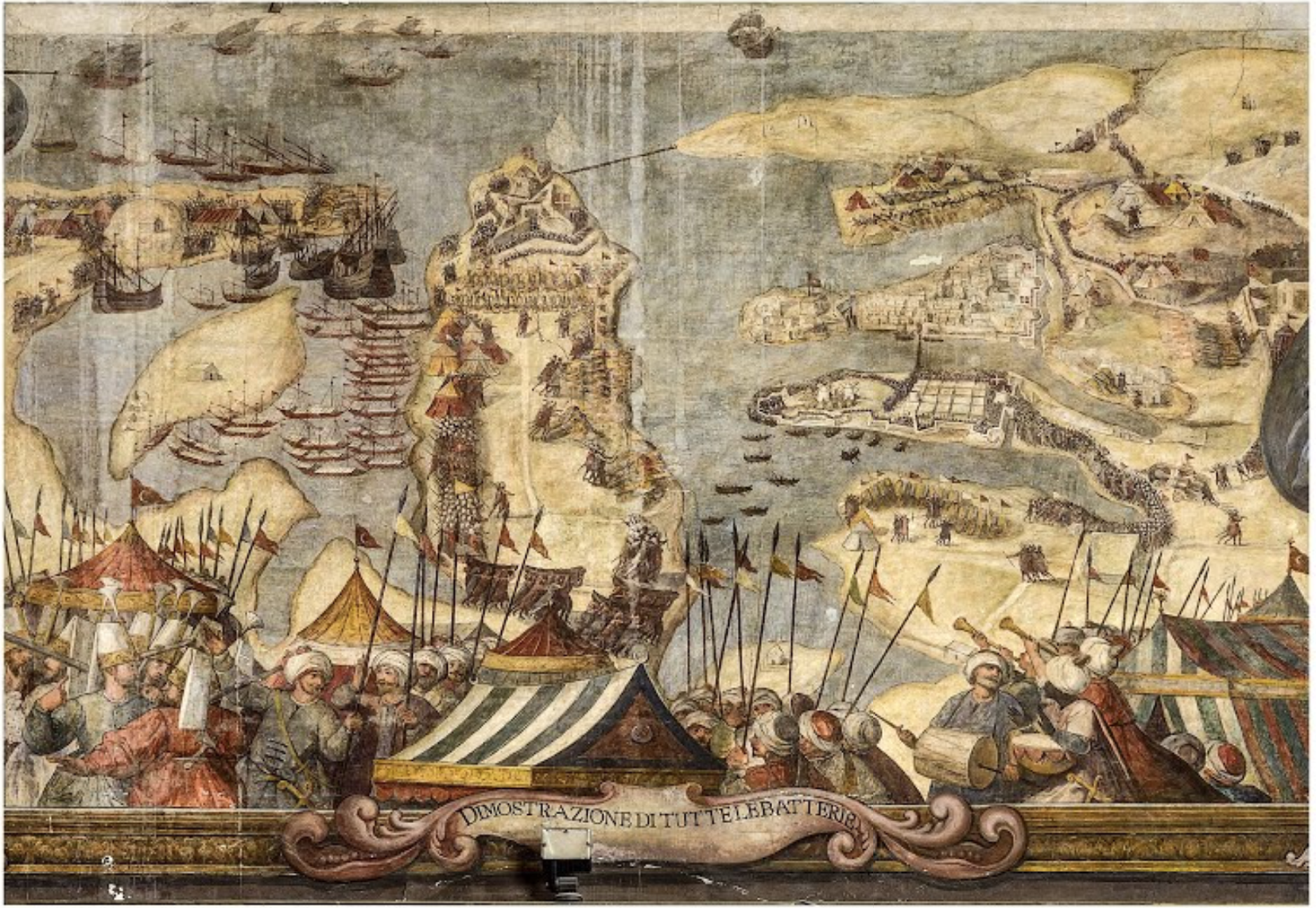
- Dimostrazione di tutte le batterie, fresco by Matteo Pérez d'Aleccio at the Grandmaster's Palace in Valletta
| Date | 18 May 1565 – 8 September 1565 (3 months and 3 weeks) |
| Location | Grand Harbour, Malta 35°53′31″N 14°31′06″E |
| Result | Christian coalition victory |

Belligerents
| Ottoman Empire: Regency of Algiers | (Sovereign Military Order of Malta) Malta: (Sovereign Military Order of Malta) Knights Hospitaller / Order of Malta; (Sovereign Military Order of Malta) Maltese militia; Spanish Empire; Relief force: Spanish Empire; Republic of Genoa; Duchy of Savoy (Tuscany) Duchy of Florence; Papal States |

Commanders and leaders
| Dragut †; Mustafa Pasha; Piali Pasha; Hasan Pasha; Occhiali | (Sovereign Military Order of Malta) Jean Parisot de Valette; (Sovereign Military Order of Malta) Jean de la Cassière; (Sovereign Military Order of Malta) Mathurin Romegas; (Spanish Empire) Melchior de Robles †; Relief force: (Spanish Empire) García de Toledo (Spanish Empire) Álvaro de Sande (Spanish Empire) Ascanio della Corgna |

Strength
| 35,000–40,000: 8,000 soldiers from Algiers; 2,500 corsairs from Algiers | 2,500 (6,100, including militia, servants, and galley slaves): 900 soldiers from the Spanish Empire; 800 soldiers from Italian states outside of the empire; 600 Knights Hospitaller; 200 unaffiliated soldiers from Sicily and Greece |

Casualties and losses
| 25,000–35,000 dead | At least 2,500 |

The Great Siege of Malta (Maltese: L-Assedju l-Kbir) occurred in 1565 when the Ottoman Empire attempted to conquer the island of Malta, then held by the Knights Hospitaller. The siege lasted nearly four months, from 18 May to 8 September 1565.

The Knights Hospitaller had been headquartered in Malta since 1530, after being driven out of Rhodes, also by the Ottomans, in 1522, following the siege of Rhodes. The Ottomans first attempted to take Malta in 1551 but failed. In 1565, Suleiman the Magnificent, the Ottoman Sultan, made a second attempt to take Malta. The Knights, who numbered around 500 together with approximately 6,000 footsoldiers, withstood the siege and repelled the invaders.

This victory became one of the most celebrated events of sixteenth-century Europe, to the point that Voltaire said in 1753: Rien n’est plus connu que ce siége, où la fortune de Soliman échoua ("Nothing is more known than this siege, where the fortune of Suleiman failed)." It undoubtedly contributed to the eventual erosion of the European perception of Ottoman invincibility, although the Mediterranean continued to be contested between Christian coalitions and the Muslim Turks for many years.

== Knights of Malta ==
By the end of 1522, Suleiman the Magnificent, the Ottoman Sultan, had forcibly ejected the Knights from their base on Rhodes after the six-month siege of Rhodes. Between 1523 to 1530, the Order lacked a permanent home. They became known as the Knights of Malta when, on 26 October 1530, Philippe Villiers de L'Isle-Adam, Grand Master of the Knights, sailed into the Grand Harbour with a number of his followers to lay claim to Malta and Gozo, which had been granted to them by Charles V, Holy Roman Emperor in return for one falcon sent annually to the Viceroy of Sicily and a solemn Mass to be celebrated on All Saints Day. Charles also required the Knights to garrison Tripoli, Libya, which was under the control of the Barbary corsairs, allies of the Ottomans. The Knights accepted the offer reluctantly. Malta was a small, desolate island, and for some time, many of the Knights clung to the dream of recapturing Rhodes.

Nevertheless, the Order soon turned Malta into a naval base. The island's position in the centre of the Mediterranean made it a strategically crucial gateway between East and West, especially as the Barbary corsairs increased their forays into the western Mediterranean throughout the 1540s and 1550s.

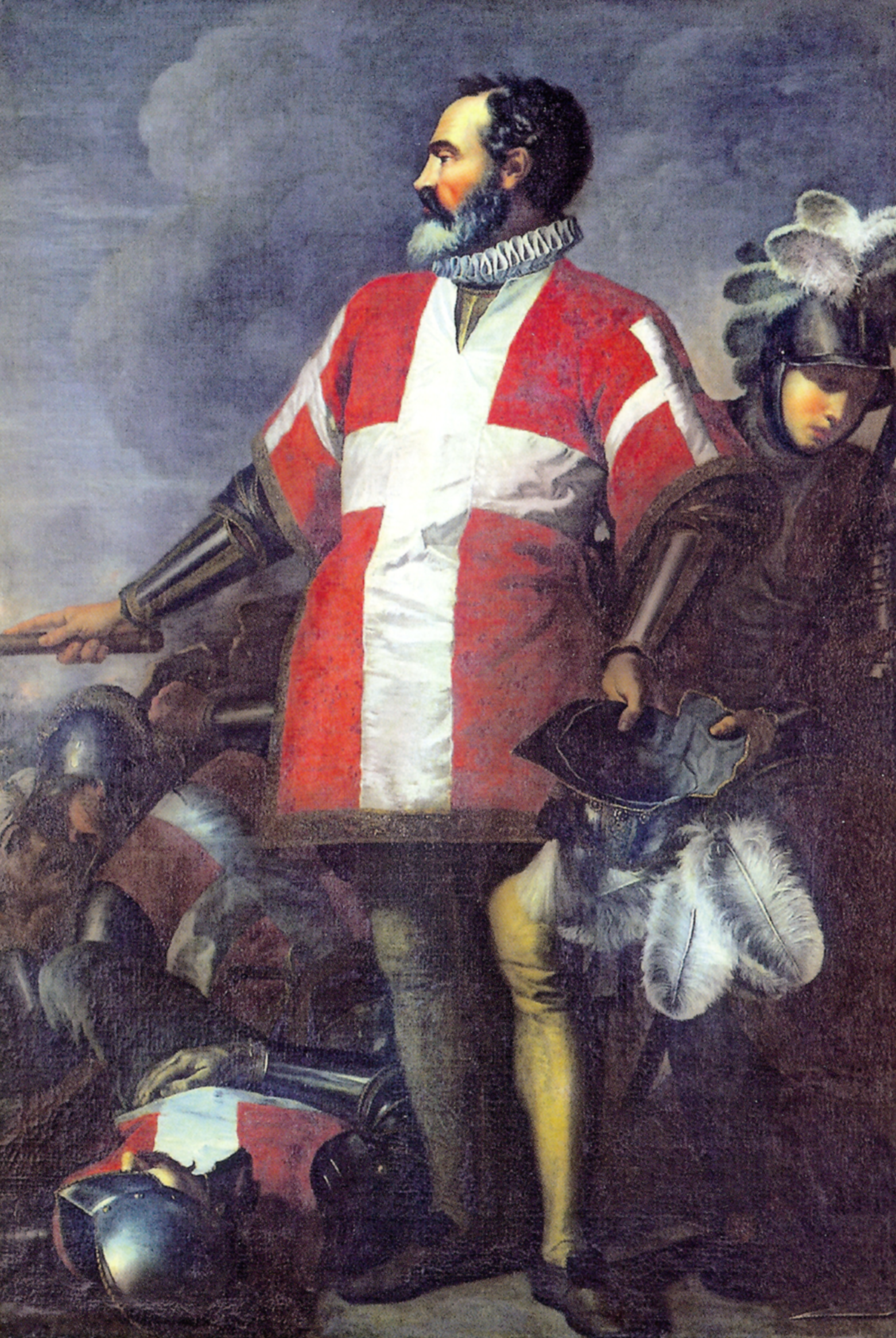
Jean Parisot de Valette

In particular, the corsair Dragut posed a major threat to the Christian nations of the central Mediterranean. Dragut and the Knights were continually at loggerheads. In 1551, Dragut and the Ottoman admiral Sinan Pasha decided to take Malta, and invaded the island with a force of about 10,000 men. After only a few days, however, Dragut broke off the siege and moved to the neighbouring island of Gozo, where he bombarded the Cittadella for several days. The Governor of Gozo, the Knight Galatian de Sesse, surrendered and the corsairs sacked the town and took virtually the entire population of Gozo (approximately 5,000 people) into captivity. Dragut and Sinan then sailed south to Tripoli, where they soon seized the Knights' garrison there. They initially installed a local leader, Murad Agha, as governor, but Dragut subsequently took control of the area.

Expecting another Ottoman invasion within a year, the new Grand Master, Juan de Homedes, ordered the strengthening of Fort St. Angelo at the tip of Birgu, as well as the construction of two new forts, Fort Saint Michael on the Senglea promontory and Fort Saint Elmo at the seaward end of Mount Sciberras (now Valletta). The two new forts were built in the remarkably short period of six months in 1552. All three forts proved crucial during the Great Siege.

The next several years were relatively calm, although the guerre de course (commerce raiding) between Muslims and Christians continued unabated. In 1557, the Knights elected Jean Parisot de Valette Grand Master of the Order. He continued his raids on non-Christian shipping, and his private vessels are known to have taken some 3,000 Muslim and Jewish slaves during his tenure as Grand Master.

By 1559, Dragut was causing the Christian powers such distress, even raiding the coasts of Spain, that Philip II organized the largest naval expedition in fifty years to evict the corsair from Tripoli. The Knights joined the expedition, which consisted of about 54 galleys and 14,000 men. This ill-fated campaign climaxed in the Battle of Djerba in May 1560, when Ottoman admiral Piyale Pasha surprised the Christian fleet off the Tunisian island of Djerba, capturing or sinking about half the Christian ships. The battle was a disaster for the Christians, and it marked the high point of Ottoman domination of the Mediterranean.

== Towards the siege ==
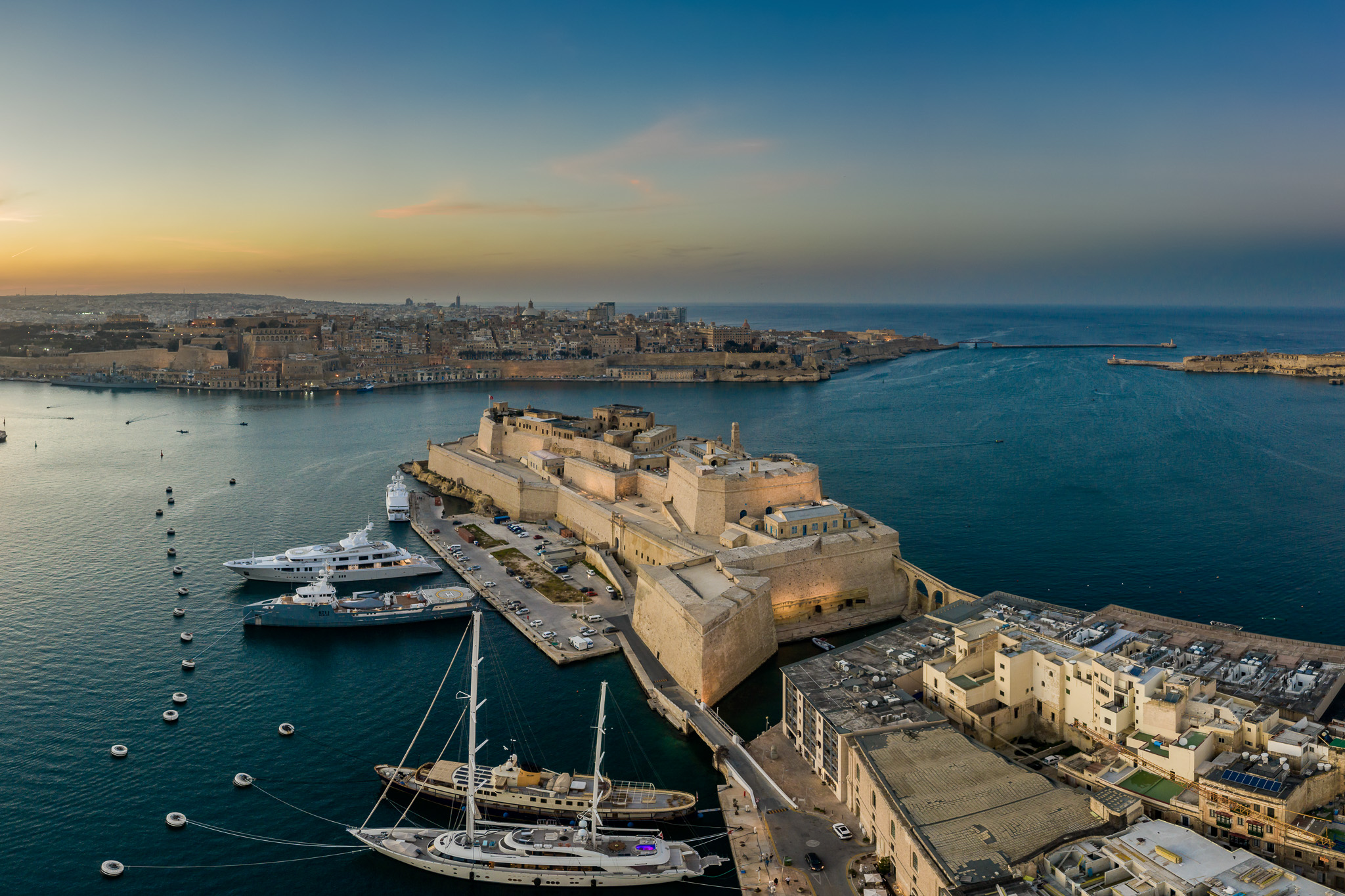
Fort St. Angelo

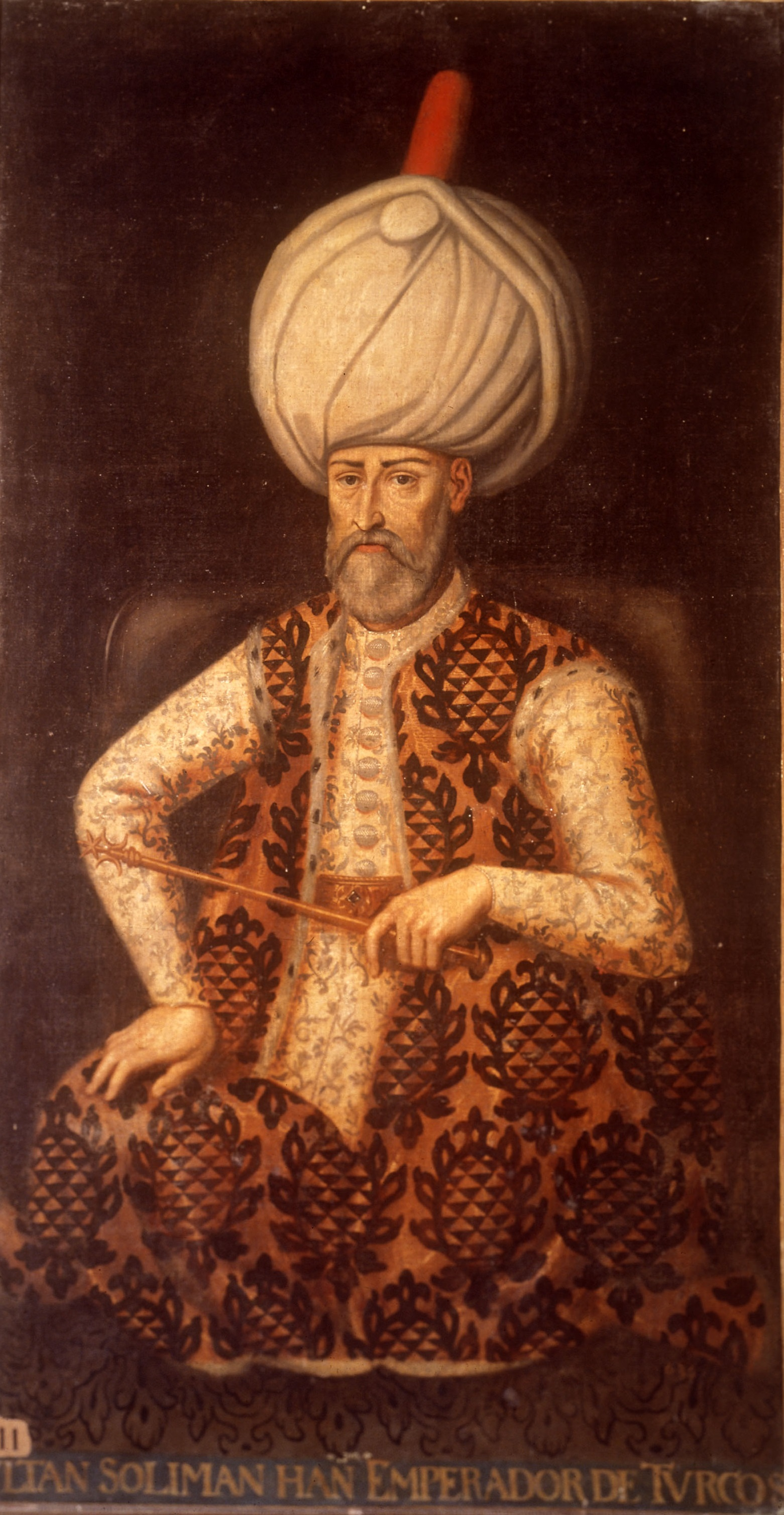
Suleiman I

After Djerba there could be little doubt that the Turks would eventually attack Malta again. Malta was of immense strategic importance to the Ottoman long-term plan to conquer more of Europe, since Malta was a stepping stone to Sicily, and Sicily in turn could be a base for an invasion of the Kingdom of Naples. In August 1560, Jean de Valette sent a despatch to all the Order's priories ordering that their knights prepare to return to Malta as soon as a citazione (summons) was issued. After Djerba, the Turks made a strategic error in not attacking Malta at once, while the Spanish fleet lay in ruins, as the five-year delay allowed Spain to rebuild its forces.

Meanwhile, the Knights continued to prey on Turkish shipping. In mid-1564, Romegas, the Order's most notorious seafarer, captured several large merchantmen, including one that belonged to the Chief Eunuch of the seraglio, and took numerous high-ranking prisoners, including the governor of Cairo, the governor of Alexandria, and the former nurse of Sultan Suleiman's daughter. Romegas' exploits gave the Turks a casus belli, and by the end of 1564, Suleiman had resolved to wipe the Knights of Malta off the face of the earth.

By early 1565, Grand Master de Valette's network of spies in Constantinople had informed him that the invasion was imminent. De Valette set about raising troops in Italy, laying in stores and finishing work on Fort Saint Angelo, Fort Saint Michael, and Fort Saint Elmo.

== Tactics and weaponry ==
All known techniques of siege warfare were employed during the siege of Malta. Turkish forces had a huge siege tower with a drawbridge from which sharpshooters fired over the walls of Fort St. Angelo. The tower was constructed to be resistant to fire with leather sheets kept moist from water tanks contained inside the tower. Despite this, Maltese masons had hidden artillery within the walls, leaving the outer masonry in place to conceal it from view. Concealed from sight, the defenders were able to move the cannon into position, loaded with chain shot, without revealing its location to the Turks, who had already taken positions in the tower when it was destroyed.

== Armies ==
The Turkish armada, which set sail from Constantinople on 22 March, was by all accounts one of the largest assembled since antiquity. According to one of the earliest and most complete histories of the siege, that of the Order's official historian Giacomo Bosio, the fleet consisted of 193 vessels, which included 131 galleys, seven galliots (small galleys), and four galleasses (large galleys), the remainder being transport vessels. Contemporary letters from García Álvarez de Toledo y Osorio of Sicily give similar numbers."

The Italian mercenary Francisco Balbi di Correggio (serving as an arquebusier in the Spanish corps), gave the forces as:

| The Knights Hospitaller | The Ottomans |
|---|---|
| 500 Knights Hospitaller | 6,000 Sipahis (cavalry) |
| 400 Spanish soldiers | 500 Sipahis from Karamania |
| 800 Italian soldiers | 6,000 Janissaries |
| 500 soldiers from the galleys (Spanish Empire) | 400 adventurers from Mytiline |
| 200 Greek and Sicilian soldiers | 2,500 Sipahis from Rumelia |
| 100 soldiers of the garrison of Fort St. Elmo | 3,500 adventurers from Rumelia |
| 100 servants of the knights | 4,000 "religious servants" |
| 500 galley slaves | 6,000 other volunteers |
| 3,000 soldiers drawn from the Maltese population | Various corsairs from Tripoli and Algiers |
| Total: 6,100 | Total: 28,500 from the East, 40,000 in all |

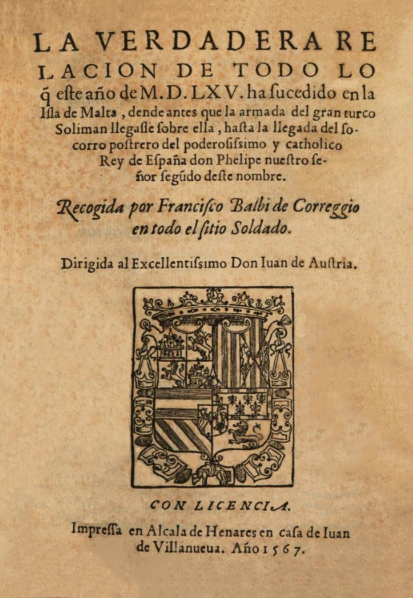
First edition of Balbi's account of the siege of Malta, printed in Alcalá de Henares in 1567.

The Knight Hipolito Sans, in a lesser-known account, also lists about 48,000 invaders, although it is not clear how independent his work is from Balbi's. Other contemporary authors give much lower figures. In a letter written to Philip II only four days after the siege began, de Valette himself says that "the number of soldiers that will make land is between 15,000 and 16,000, including seven thousand arquebusier or more, that is four thousand janissaries and three thousand sipahis." On the other hand, in a letter to the Prior of Germany a month after the siege, de Valette writes, "This fleet consisted of two hundred and fifty ships, triremes, biremes and other vessels; the nearest estimate we could make of the enemy's force was 40,000 fighting men."

Indeed, a letter written during the siege by the liaison with Sicily, Captain Vincenzo Anastagi, states the enemy force was only 22,000 and several other letters of the time give similar numbers. However, Bosio arrives at a total of about 30,000, which is consistent with Balbi's "named troops." Richard Knolles' history gives essentially the same figure.

== Siege ==
=== Arrival of the Ottomans ===
Before the Turks arrived, de Valette ordered the harvesting of all the crops, including unripened grain, to deprive the enemy of any local food supplies. Furthermore, the Knights poisoned all wells with bitter herbs and dead animals.

The Turkish armada arrived at dawn on Friday, 18 May, but did not at once make land. The first fighting broke out on 19 May. A day later, the Ottoman fleet sailed up the southern coast of the island, turned around and finally anchored at Marsaxlokk (Marsa Sirocco) Bay, nearly 10 kilometers (6.2 miles) from the Grand Harbour region. According to most accounts, in particular Balbi's, a dispute arose between the leader of the land forces, the 4th Vizier serdar Kızıl Ahmedli Mustafa Pasha, and the supreme naval commander, Piyale Pasha, about where to anchor the fleet. Piyale wished to shelter it at Marsamxett Harbour, just north of the Grand Harbour, in order to avoid the sirocco and be nearer the action, but Mustafa disagreed, because to anchor the fleet there would require first reducing Fort St. Elmo, which guarded the entrance to the harbour. Mustafa intended, according to these accounts, to attack the poorly defended former capital Mdina, which stood in the centre of the island, then attack Forts St. Angelo and Michael by land. If so, an attack on Fort St. Elmo would have been entirely unnecessary. Nevertheless, Mustafa relented, apparently believing only a few days would be necessary to destroy St. Elmo. After the Turks were able to emplace their guns, at the end of May they commenced a bombardment.

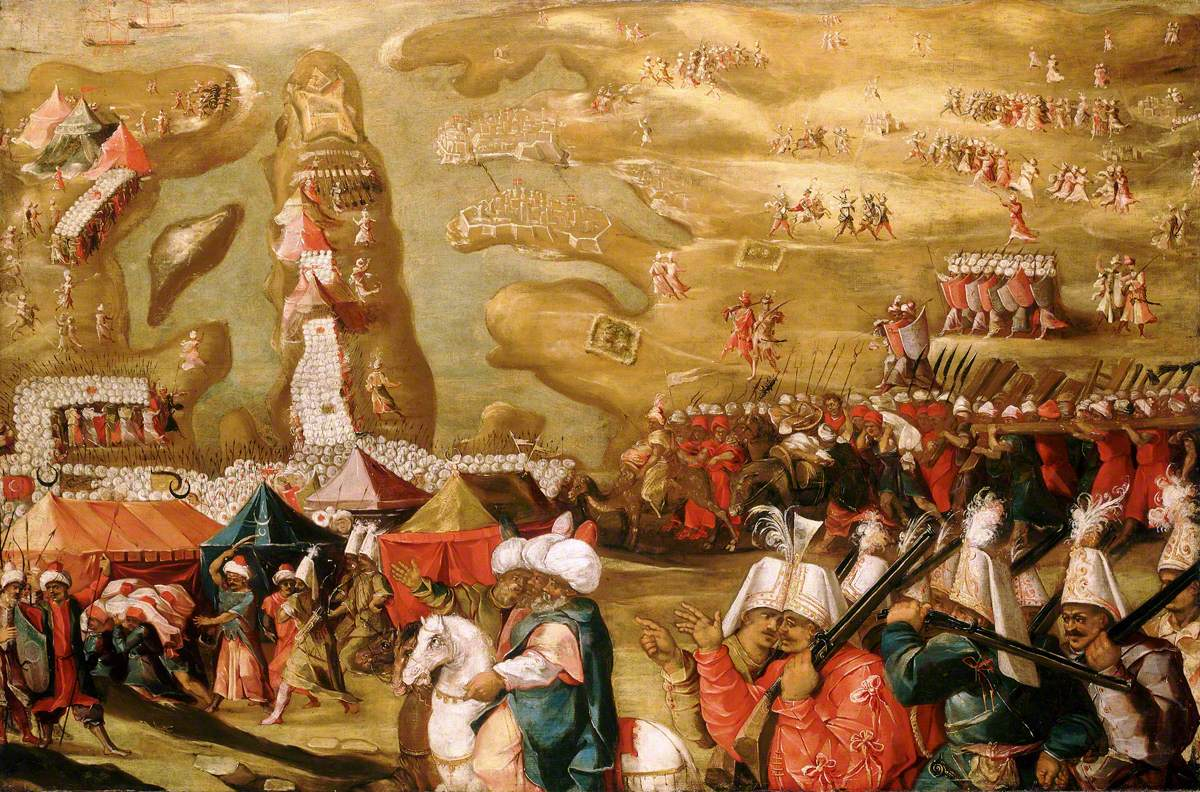
Siege of St. Elmo on 27 May 1565

It certainly seems true that Suleiman had seriously blundered in splitting the command three ways. He not only split command between Piyale and Mustafa, but he ordered both of them to defer to Dragut when he arrived from Tripoli. Contemporary letters from spies in Constantinople, however, suggest that the plan had always been to take Fort St. Elmo first. In any case, this decision proved to be a critical mistake for the Turks.

While the Ottomans were landing, the knights and Maltese made some last-minute improvements to the defences of Birgu and Senglea. The Ottomans set up their main camp in Marsa, which was close to the Knights' fortifications. In the following days, the Ottomans set up camps and batteries on Santa Margherita Hill and the Sciberras Peninsula. The attacks on Birgu began on 21 May, while Senglea was first attacked a day later.

Map of Malta at the time of the Great Siege. Captions in French

=== Capture of Fort St. Elmo ===
The darkness of the night then became as bright as day, due to the vast quantity of artificial fires. So bright was it indeed that we could see St Elmo quite clearly. The gunners of St Angelo... were able to lay and train their pieces upon the advancing Turks, who were picked out in the light of the fires.

— Francisco Balbi, Spanish soldier

In the initial weeks of the siege, prior to the arrival of the small relief sent by Viceroy of Sicilia Garcia de Toledo, two companies of veteran soldiers from the Tercio of Sicily faced the Ottoman forces, led by three Spanish captains. These companies were dispatched from Sicily to Malta in the spring, anticipating the imminent Ottoman attack reported by spies. The companies included those of Captains Andrés Miranda and Juan de la Cerda. However, Captain Miranda was not present at the siege's outset, as he remained in Sicily, serving as a courier and military adviser for García de Toledo. His company was temporarily commanded by his second lieutenant, Gonzalo de Medrano.

Both companies played a crucial role in the early skirmishes against the Turks at the gates of Birgu. During one such engagement, Ensign Gonzalo de Medrano notably distinguished himself in front of his arquebusiers, gaining the attention of Grand Master La Valette. When the Ottomans targeted Fort Saint Elmo to secure their fleet in Marsamxett harbour, the Grand Master's first action was to send the two Spanish companies to Saint Elmo. Utilizing his authority as Captain General of the Island of Malta, granted by the King of Spain, he promoted Gonzalo de Medrano to captain and assigned him to lead Captain Miranda's company.

At Saint Elmo, approximately 500 Spanish soldiers from the two companies of the Tercio Viejo de Sicilia were besieged, alongside their captains Juan de la Cerda and Gonzalo de Medrano, as well as around 100 knights and staff members, including Andrés de Miranda.

Having correctly calculated that the Turks would seek to secure a disembarkation point for their fleet and would thus begin the campaign by attempting to capture Fort St. Elmo, de Valette sent reinforcements and concentrated half of his heavy artillery within the fort. His intent was for them to hold out for a relief promised by Garcia de Toledo, Viceroy of Sicily. The unremitting bombardment of the fort from three dozen guns on the higher ground of Mt. Xiberras began on 27 May, and reduced the fort to rubble within a week, but de Valette evacuated the wounded nightly and resupplied the fort from across the harbour. After arriving in May, Dragut set up new batteries to imperil the ferry lifeline. On 3 June, a party of Turk Janissaries managed to seize the fort's ravelin and ditch. Still, by 8 June, the Knights sent Captain Gonzalo de Medrano with a message to the Grand Master that the Fort could no longer be held but were rebuffed with messages that St. Elmo must hold until the reinforcements arrived.

The Turks attacked the damaged walls on June 10 and 15, and made an all-out assault on June 16, during which even the slave and hired galley oarsmen housed in St. Elmo, as well as the native Maltese soldiers, reportedly fought and died "almost as bravely as the Knights themselves." Two days later, Dragut was seen in a trench cannon emplacement arguing with the Turkish gunners about their level of fire. At Dragut's insistence a cannon's aim was lowered, but the aim was too low, and when fired its ball detached part of the trench, which hit Dragut in the head, killing him. According to an alternate version by chronicler Bosio, it was a lucky shot by Spanish artillerymen from the Fort St. Angelo that mortally wounded Dragut. During the siege, a Turk planted his standard on the rampart. However, it was taken away by Captain Gonzalo de Medrano, who cut down the Turk and at the same moment received a mortal wound from an arquebus to the head.

Finally, on 23 June, the Turks seized what was left of Fort St. Elmo. They killed all the defenders, totaling over 1,500 men, but spared nine Knights whom the Corsairs had captured. A small number of Maltese managed to escape by swimming across the harbour.

Although the Turks did succeed in capturing St. Elmo, allowing Piyale to anchor his fleet in Marsamxett, the siege of Fort St. Elmo had cost the Turks at least 6,000 men, including half of their Janissaries.

Mustafa had the bodies of the knights decapitated and their bodies floated across the bay on mock crucifixes. In response, de Valette beheaded all his Turkish prisoners, loaded their heads into his cannons, and fired them into the Turkish camp.

=== Panic ===
By this time, word of the siege was spreading. As soldiers and adventurers gathered in Sicily for Don Garcia's relief, panic spread as well. There can be little doubt that the stakes were high, perhaps higher than at any other time in the contest between the Ottoman Empire and Europe. Queen Elizabeth I of England wrote, "If the Turks should prevail against the Isle of Malta, it is uncertain what further peril might follow to the rest of Christendom."

All contemporary sources indicate the Turks intended to proceed to the Tunisian fortress of La Goletta and wrest it from the Spaniards, and Suleiman had also spoken of invading Europe through Italy.

However, modern scholars tend to disagree with this interpretation of the siege's importance. Henry Sire, a historian who has written a history of the Order, is of the opinion that the siege represented an overextension of Ottoman forces, and argues that if the island had fallen, it would have quickly been retaken by a massive Spanish counterattack. At the time, Philip II indeed considered that reconquering Malta might be easier than defending it.

=== Deliberation in Messina ===
Although García de Toledo didn't send the promised relief all at once (troops were still being levied), he persuaded Philip II of Spain to allow him to release an advance force of some 600 men under the command of Don Melchor de Robles, a Spanish knight. After several attempts, this piccolo soccorso (Italian: small relief), ferried by Juan de Cardona, managed to land on Malta in July 3 and sneak into Birgu, raising the spirits of the besieged garrison immensely. However, this relief force was too small to make any significant impact. Don Garcia pleaded with Philip II to authorize a much larger relief force, but the monarch was wary of risking his newly assembled armada, which would have left Christendom defenseless if it was destroyed. Eventually, by the end of July, fleets brought by Álvaro de Bazán and Giovanni Andrea Doria enabled Toledo to gather 90 galleys and 45 sailing ships in Sicily.

On August 15, Don García hosted a military council in Messina. Ascanio della Corgna ruled out a direct attack on the Ottoman fleet, pointing out that too many of their vessels were sailing ships, which had proved unreliable against Turkish galleys in the Battle of Preveza, and that their sailors were fearful by these and other defeats. Agreeing with him, Álvaro de Sande, a veteran who had passed years as prisoner in Constantinople, proposed to attack some Ottoman territory in an attempt to force the Turks to divide their forces. However, Bazán presented a plan to quickly land reinforcements in Malta with 60 galleys and withdraw it before the Ottomans could react, assuring that the Turkish fleet was unable to simultaneously repulse them and maintain their blockade. Although the council was uneasy, Bazán convinced Don García to choose his plan.

The fleet sailed off Syracuse on August 25 under the personal command of Don García, towing 40 supply ships and carrying 8,000 soldiers embarked under the command of Sande and Corgna. However, their first attempt to reach Malta was trounced by a violent storm, which forced them to return scattered to Trapani, and a second storm caused similar results. Only by July 7 they managed to reach the island and disembark.

=== The Senglea Peninsula ===
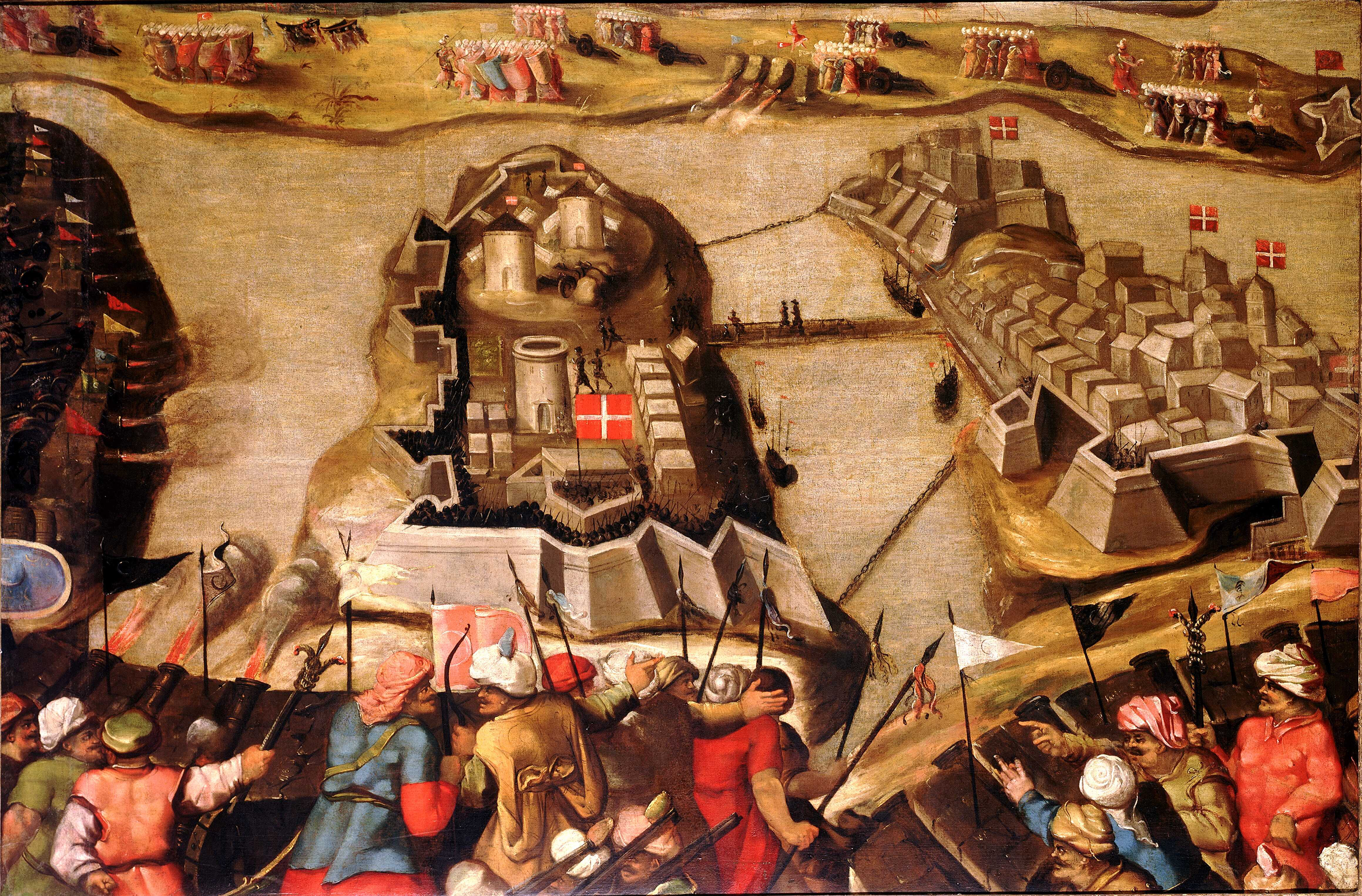
The siege of St Michael, showing the Christian Knights cut off from the sea and surrounded in their remaining fortresses of Birgu, St Angelo and St Michael.

On 15 July, Mustafa ordered a double attack against the Senglea peninsula. He had transported 100 small vessels across Mt. Sciberras to the Grand Harbour, thus avoiding the strong cannons of Fort St. Angelo, in order to launch a sea attack against the promontory using about 1,000 Janissaries, while the Corsairs attacked Fort St. Michael on the landward end. Luckily for the Maltese, a defector warned de Valette about the impending strategy and the Grand Master had time to construct a palisade along the Senglea promontory, which successfully helped to deflect the attack. Nevertheless, the assault probably would have succeeded had the Turkish boats not come into point-blank range (less than 200 yards) of a sea-level battery of five cannons that had been constructed by Commander Chevalier de Guiral at the base of Fort St. Angelo with the sole purpose of stopping such an amphibious attack. Just two salvos sank all but one of the vessels, killing or drowning over 800 of the attackers. The land attack failed simultaneously when relief forces were able to cross to Ft. St. Michael across a floating bridge, with the result that Malta was saved for the day.

Three days later, a captured Turk revealed to La Valette that the Ottoman contingent was increasingly worried about the threat of García de Toledo's relief fleet. Piali and Mustafa argued about how to approach it; the first took their armada to the sea to defend a possible attack, making the besiegers believe they were being abandoned in Malta, until he was convinced to return and resume the siege days later.

The Turks by now had ringed Birgu and Senglea with some 65 siege guns and subjected the town to what was probably the most sustained bombardment in history up to that time. (Balbi claims that 130,000 cannonballs were fired during the course of the siege.) Having largely destroyed one of the town's crucial bastions, Mustafa ordered another massive double assault on 7 August, this time against Fort St. Michael and Birgu itself. On this occasion, the Turks breached the town walls and it seemed that the siege was over, but unexpectedly the invaders retreated. As it happened, the cavalry commander Captain Vincenzo Anastagi, on his daily sortie from Mdina, had attacked the unprotected Turkish field hospital, killing everyone and beheading more than sixty Turks. The Turks, thinking the Christian relief had arrived from Sicily, broke off their assault.

=== St. Michael and Birgu ===
After the attack of 7 August, the Turks resumed their bombardment of St. Michael and Birgu, mounting at least one other major assault against the town on 19–21 August. What actually happened during those days of intense fighting is not entirely clear.

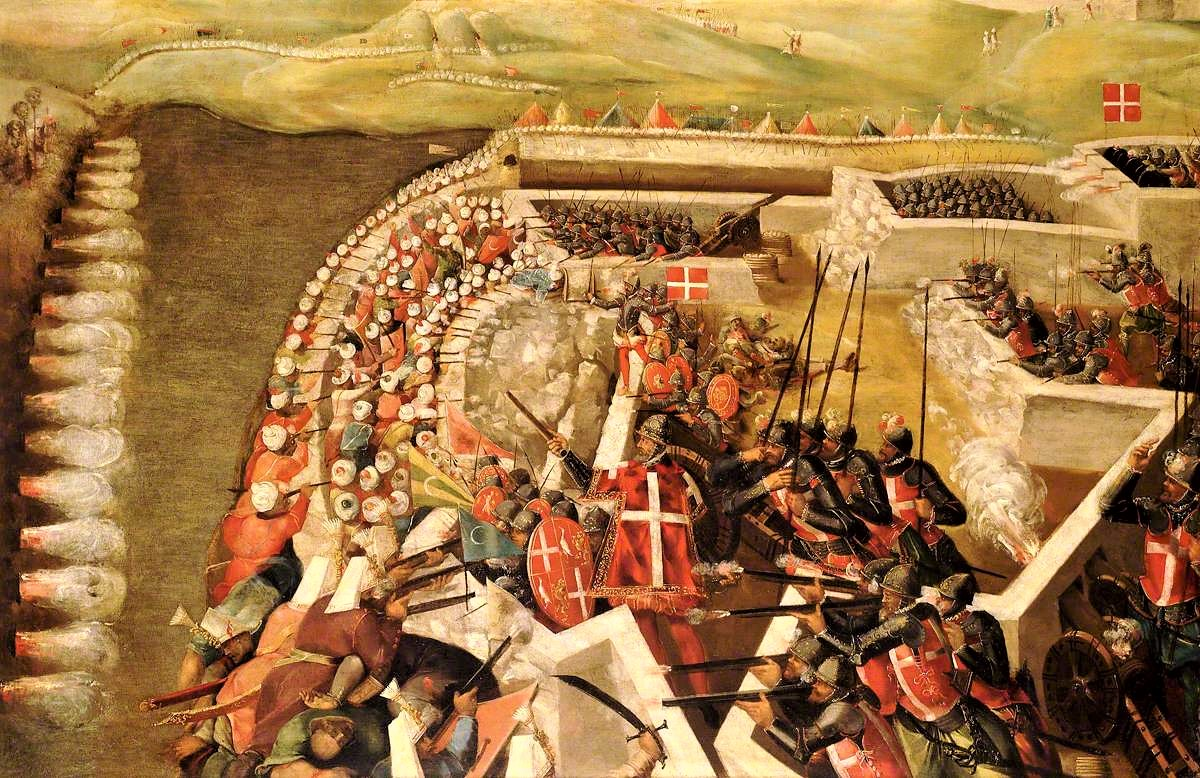
Attack on the post of the Castilian knights on 21 August 1565

Bradford's account of the climax of the siege has a mine exploding with a huge blast, breaching the town walls and causing stone and dust to fall into the ditch, with the Turks charging even as the debris was still falling. He also has the 70-year-old de Valette saving the day by leading towards the Turks some hundred troops that had been waiting in the Piazza of Birgu. Balbi, in his diary entry for 20 August, says only that de Valette was told the Turks were within the walls; the Grand Master ran to "the threatened post where his presence worked wonders. Sword in hand, he remained at the most dangerous place until the Turks retired." Bosio also has no mention of the successful detonation of a mine. Rather, in his report a panic ensued when the townspeople spied the Turkish standards outside the walls. The Grand Master ran there, but found no Turks. In the meantime, a cannonade atop Ft. St. Angelo, stricken by the same panic, killed a number of townsfolk with friendly fire.

=== Fort St. Michael and Mdina ===
The situation was sufficiently dire that, at some point in August, the Council of Elders decided to abandon the town and retreat to Fort St. Angelo. De Valette, however, vetoed this proposal. If he guessed that the Turks were losing their will, he was correct. Although the bombardment and minor assaults continued, the invaders were stricken by an increasing desperation. Towards the end of August, the Turks attempted to take Fort St. Michael, first with the help of a manta (similar to a Testudo formation), a small siege engine covered with shields, then by use of a full-blown siege tower. In both cases, Maltese engineers tunneled out through the rubble and destroyed the constructions with point-blank salvos of chain shot.

At the beginning of September, the weather was turning and Mustafa ordered a march on Mdina, intending to winter there. However the attack failed to occur. The poorly defended and supplied city deliberately started firing its cannon at the approaching Turks at pointlessly long range; this bluff scared them away by fooling the already demoralised Turks into thinking the city had ammunition to spare. By 8 September, the Turks had embarked their artillery and were preparing to leave the island, having lost perhaps a third of their men to fighting and disease.

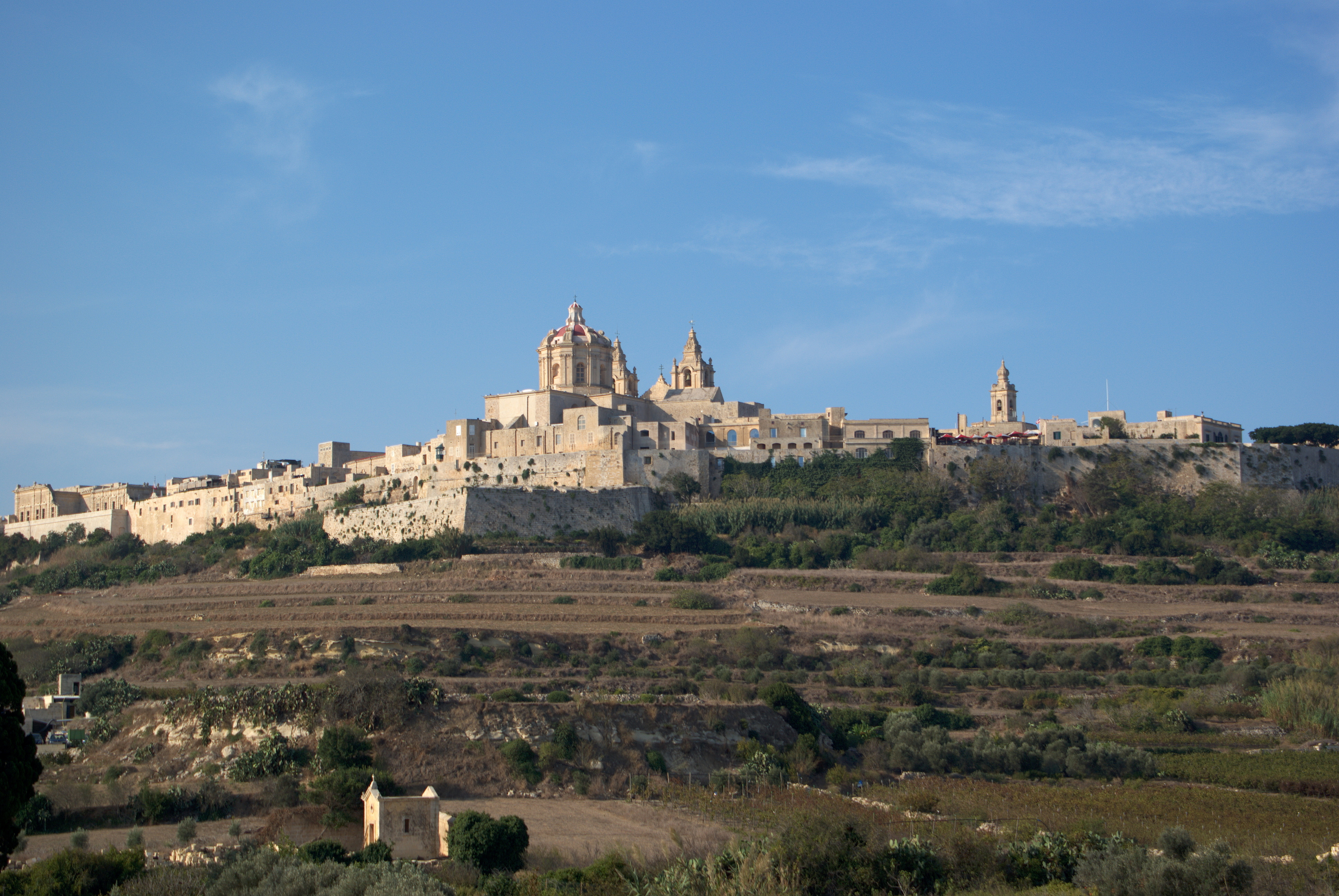

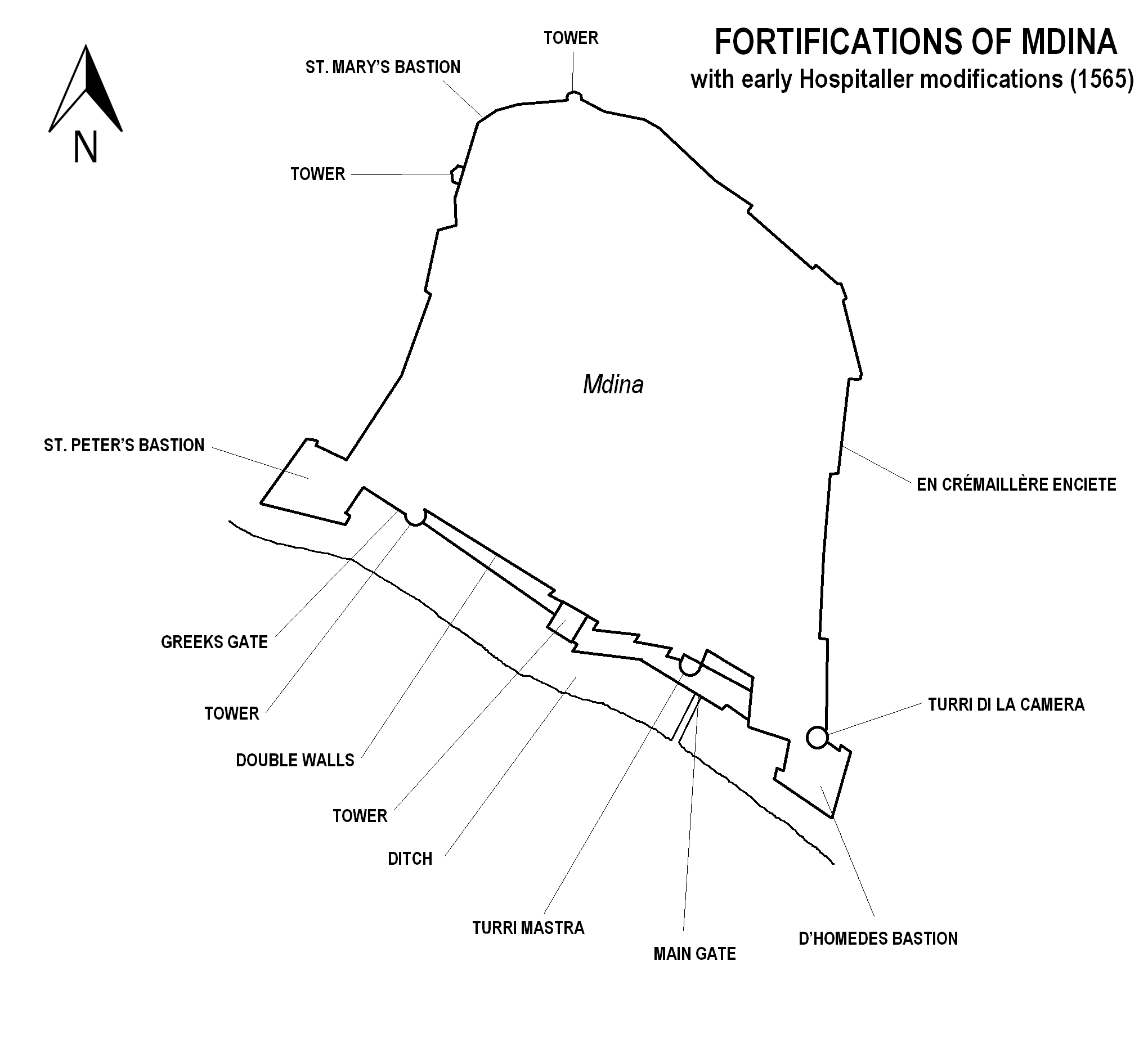
View of Mdina (above) and map of the city's fortifications as they were in 1565 (below)

=== Gran Soccorso and battle in Mdina ===
On 7 September, García de Toledo had, at last, landed 8,000 men at St. Paul's Bay on the north end of the island. After parading in front of the Ottoman armada to distract them, Toledo returned to Sicily planning to fetch another 4,000 men and land a third relief. The Turks were momentarily confused by the presence of the Spanish in the island, which allowed Sande and Corgna to complete a march with their supplies under the scorching sun until reaching the city of Mdina. The so-called Grande Soccorso ("great relief") positioned themselves on the ridge of San Pawl tat-Tarġa at Naxxar on the 13th of September, waiting for the Ottoman assault. They consisted mainly of Spanish and Italian soldiers sent by the Spanish Empire, the Grand Duchy of Tuscany, the Republic of Genoa, the Papal States, and the Duchy of Savoy.

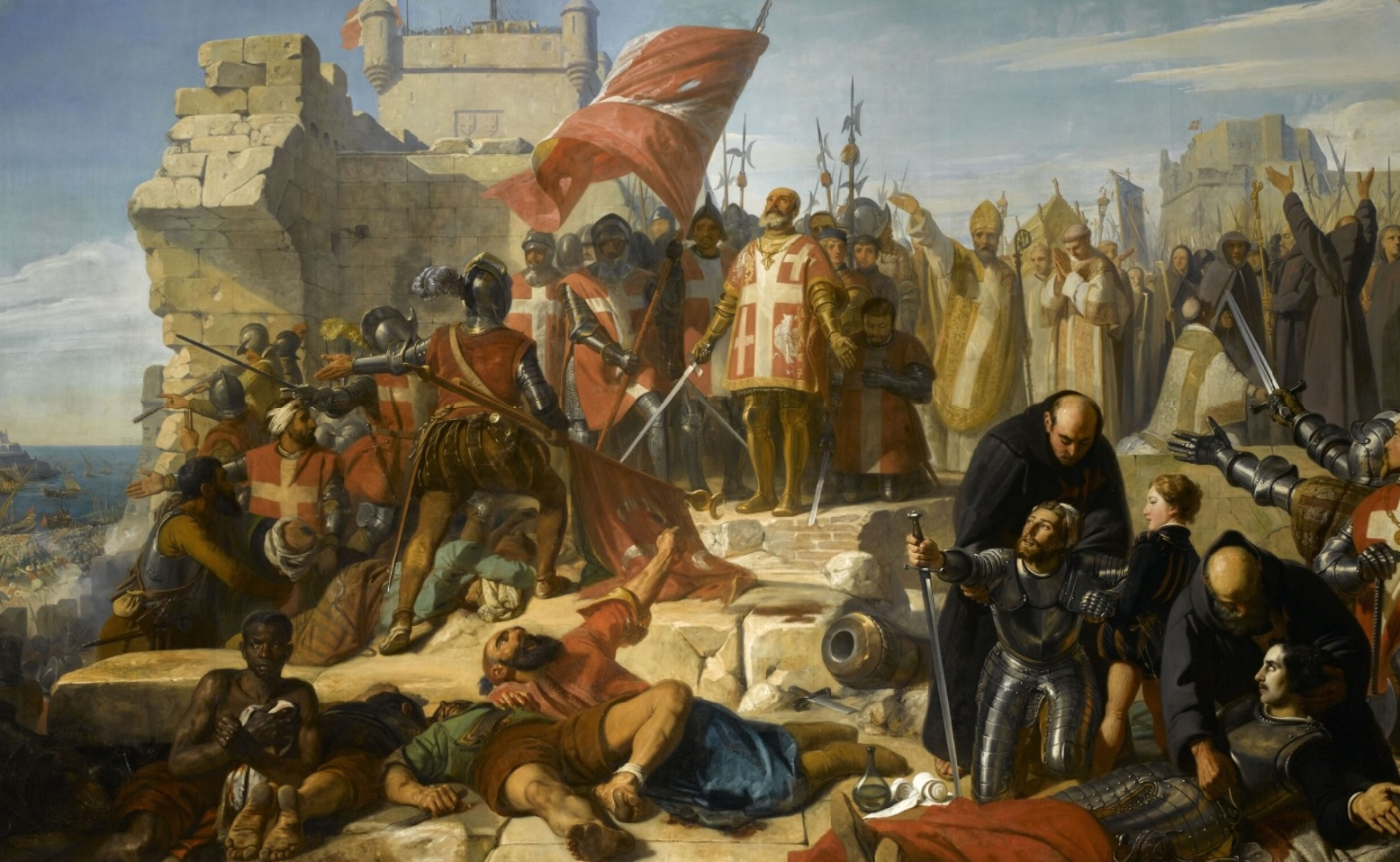
Lifting of the Siege of Malta by Charles-Philippe Larivière (1798–1876). Hall of the Crusades, Palace of Versailles.

Believing the relief to be much bigger, Mustafa Pasha ordered the army to reembark, only to interrupt the evacuation and call out the land troops again when he was contacted by a Morisco deserter from Alcañiz. The latter informed him that the Ottomans actually outnumbered Garcia's forces and that command of those was divided between the arguing Sande and Corgna, not unlike Piali and Mustafa himself. Mustafa thought that by defeating the relief, Malta would definitely be pushed to surrender, so he readied 10,000 men on the night of September 10, hoping to catch the relievers before they could recover from the travel. A Sardinian renegade then deserted to the Christians and leaked Mustafa's plan.

By daybreak, Mustafa and his army were in front of Mdina, heading to gain a hill nearby to the city. Although Della Corgna advised to remain behind the walls, Sande came out to check the Turkish advance with a company of arquebusiers, reaching the hill before they did and firing against the Ottoman lines with the terrain on their favor. The rest of the army joined from the city. The battle was fierce and contested under a hot sun, with the Ottomans holding the line for a time, until they finally collapsed to the pressure of the veteran Spanish infantry. The Turks were eventually routed and fled to the beach, where the Christians chased them and killed many on the water until the arrival of Piali's galleys, which allowed the Ottoman survivors to reembark covered by their gunfire. After this, Mustafa called for the retreat of all of their forces from the islands on 13 September, leaving behind their heaviest baggage.

García de Toledo sighted them while leading the third relief, which he disembarked again in Sicily after realizing their victory. He armed 50 galleys for combat and chased the Ottoman fleet, hoping to bite them at their most vulnerable when they disbanded. Finding notice of them by Zante, he laid in ambush in Cerigo, but found out most of the Ottoman fleet had either taken refuge in Modon or made it home to Constantinople. On October 7, he returned to Messina, declaring the campaign closed.

== Aftermath ==
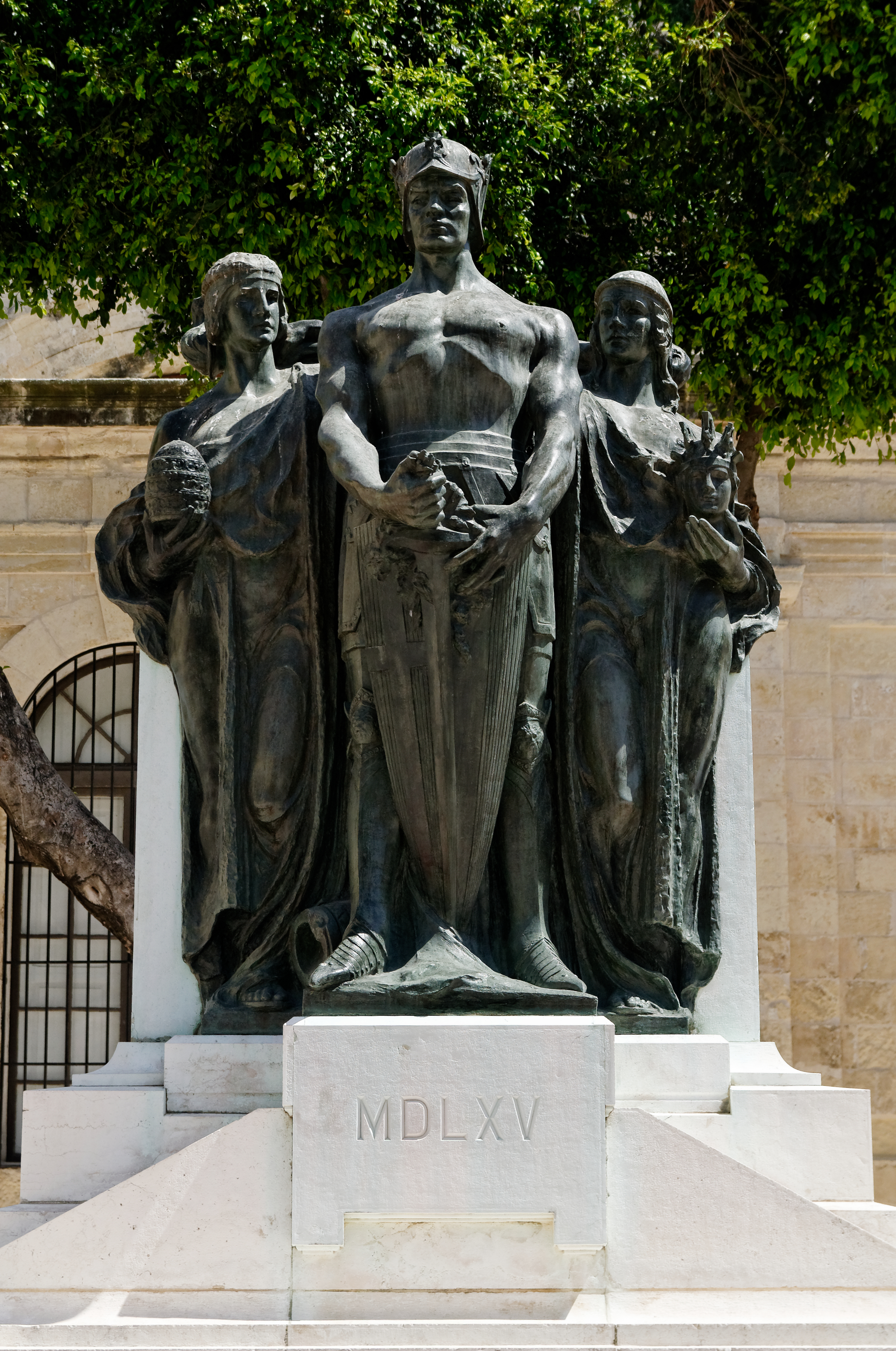
Great Siege Monument by Antonio Sciortino in Valletta

The number of casualties is in as much dispute as the number of invaders. Balbi gives 35,000 Turkish deaths, Bosio 30,000 casualties (including sailors). Several other sources give about 25,000. The knights lost a third of their number, and Malta lost a third of its inhabitants. Birgu and Senglea were essentially leveled. Still, 6,000 defenders had managed to withstand a siege of more than four months in the hot summer, despite enduring a bombardment of some 130,000 cannonballs.

Jean de Valette, Grand Master of the Knights of Malta, had a key influence in the victory against the Ottomans with his example and his ability to encourage and hold people together. This example had a major impact, bringing together the kings of Europe in an alliance against the previously seemingly invincible Ottomans; the result was the vast union of forces against the Ottomans at the Battle of Lepanto six years later. Such was the gratitude of Europe for the knights' heroic defence that money soon began pouring into the island, allowing de Valette to construct a fortified city, Valletta, on Mt. Sciberras. His intent was to deny the position to any future enemies.

== In literature, historical fiction and popular culture ==
In the 2025 "Dad's Red Cap" episode of the BBC sitcom Here We Go, which was filmed in Malta, the siege is the subject of a repeated monologue by Paul.

In the video game Age of Empires III (2005) the first mission of the campaign mode the player plays out the Siege of Malta and its relieve.

== See also ==
- Algiers expedition (1541)
- Barbary corsairs
- Battle of Djerba
- Battle of Lepanto
- Battle of Preveza
- List of Ottoman sieges and landings
- List of sieges
- Siege of Rhodes (1480)
- Siege of Rhodes (1522)
- Toni Bajada
- Grand Harbour of Malta tornado
