= 1580 =

1580 in various calendars
- Gregorian calendar: 1580; MDLXXX
- Ab urbe condita: 2333
- Armenian calendar: 1029; ԹՎ ՌԻԹ
- Assyrian calendar: 6330
- Balinese saka calendar: 1501–1502
- Bengali calendar: 986–987
- Berber calendar: 2530
- English Regnal year: 22 Eliz. 1 – 23 Eliz. 1
- Buddhist calendar: 2124
- Burmese calendar: 942
- Byzantine calendar: 7088–7089
- Chinese calendar: 己卯年 (Earth Rabbit); 4277 or 4070 — to — 庚辰年 (Metal Dragon); 4278 or 4071
- Coptic calendar: 1296–1297
- Discordian calendar: 2746
- Ethiopian calendar: 1572–1573
- Hebrew calendar: 5340–5341
- Hindu calendars
- Vikram Samvat: 1636–1637
- Shaka Samvat: 1501–1502
- Kali Yuga: 4680–4681
- Holocene calendar: 11580
- Igbo calendar: 580–581
- Iranian calendar: 958–959
- Islamic calendar: 987–988
- Japanese calendar: Tenshō 8 (天正８年)
- Javanese calendar: 1499–1500
- Julian calendar: 1580; MDLXXX
- Korean calendar: 3913
- Minguo calendar: 332 before ROC 民前332年
- Nanakshahi calendar: 112
- Thai solar calendar: 2122–2123
- Tibetan calendar: ས་མོ་ཡོས་ལོ་ (female Earth-Hare); 1706 or 1325 or 553 — to — ལྕགས་ཕོ་འབྲུག་ལོ་ (male Iron-Dragon); 1707 or 1326 or 554

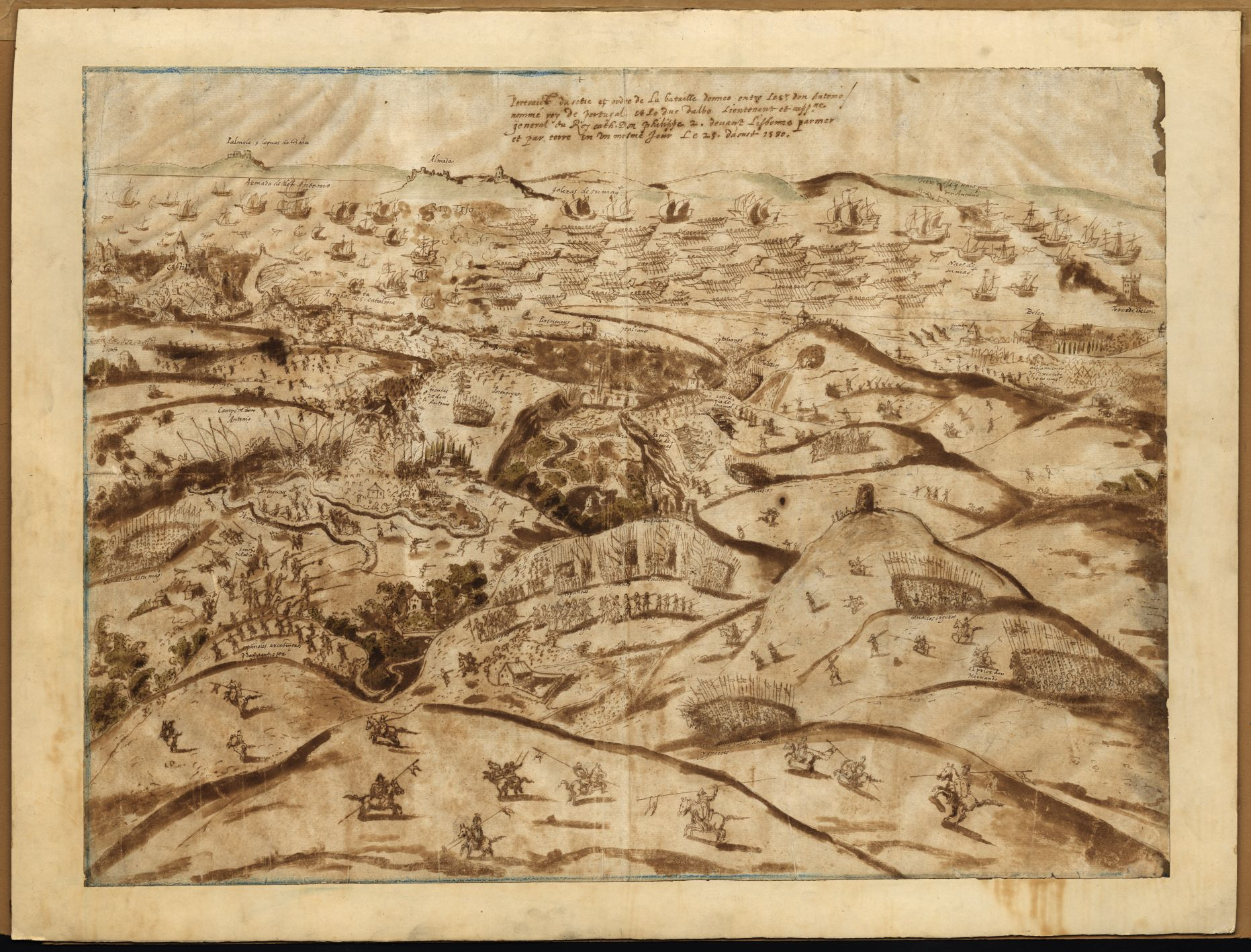
August 25: Battle of Alcântara

1580 (MDLXXX) was a leap year starting on Friday of the Julian calendar.

== Events ==
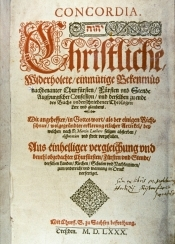
June 25: The Book of Concord is published.

=== January–March ===
- January 31 – Portuguese succession crisis of 1580: The death of Henry, King of Portugal, with no direct heirs, leads to conflict between his potential successors, including King Philip II of Spain and Infanta Catherine, Duchess of Braganza.
- February 16 – The massacre of 20 artists at the Mardi Gras festivities, at the annual Carnaval de Romans during the festival, takes place in France at Romans-sur-Isère.
- February 28 – Three Jesuit priests from Portuguese Goa, including Rodolfo Acquaviva, arrive in Agra on the mainland of India as guests of the Mughal Emperor, Akbar the Great, who is curious about Christianity. The Emperor grants land to the Jesuit fathers for the building of the first Roman Catholic Church in the Mughal Empire.
- March 1 – Michel de Montaigne signs the preface to his most significant work, Essays. They are published later this year.
- March 3 – George de Lalaing, Count of Rennenberg defects from the Union of Utrecht and the Dutch Republic, and turns over the province of Groningen to King Philip II of Spain.
- March 25 – Iberian Union: King Philip II of Spain becomes King of Portugal under the name Philip I, following the death without heirs of King Henry of Portugal, in a personal union of the crowns, thus maintaining Portuguese independence (in Europe and throughout the Portuguese Empire). The Philippine Dynasty rule lasts until 1640.

=== April–June ===
- April 6 – The Dover Straits earthquake occurs.
- April 9 – English Fury at Mechelen: English and Scottish mercenaries, assisting the Dutch Republic, storm the Spanish Netherlands city of Mechelen (in modern-day Belgium), killing 60 civilians and plundering the town's houses and churches.
- May 29 – Stephen Báthory is formally crowned as Grand Duke of Lithuania at the Vilnius Cathedral.
- May – The Lipizzan stud is established by Charles II, Archduke of Austria.
- June 5 – In the Kingdom of Golconda (part of the modern-day Indian state of Telangana), 15-year-old Muhammad Quli Qutb Shah is proclaimed as the new Sultan upon the death of his father, Ibrahim Quli Qutb Shah Wali.
- June 9 – Rebels of the Dutch Union of Utrecht, aided by French soldiers, make a surprise attack on the Spanish Netherlands city of Diest in the Duchy of Brabant, and overwhelm the strategic location, now in Belgium, in one day.
- June 11 – Within the Viceroyalty of Peru in South America Spanish explorer Juan de Garay founds the first permanent Spanish settlement at what is now the capital of Argentina, on the Rio de la Plata. Garay, who came on an expedition down the Paraná River from Asunción (now in Paraguay), arrives at the site of the failed Spanish settlement of Ciudad de Nuestra Señora Santa María del Buen Ayre, that had been created by Pedro de Mendoza in 1536 and abandoned in 1542. Garay names the new settlement "Santísima Trinidad" but the city eventually takes the name of the port, which he calls "Puerto de Santa María de los Buenos Aires."
- June 21 (8 Cemazi ul-evvel 988 AH) – England signs a commercial treaty with the Ottoman Empire, and Sultan Murad III sends a letter to Queen Elizabeth I informing her, "Just as the merchants of Poland and France and Venice come and go, the merchants of your domain also shall bring wares to our Well-Protected Domains and take away wares." In return, Murad III is able to purchase English metals (iron, brass and tin) for his war with Iran.
- June 25 – The Book of Concord, a collection of Lutheran confessional documents, is published.

=== July–September ===
- July 12 – The Ostrog Bible, the first complete printed Bible translation into a Slavic language (Old Church Slavonic), is first printed at Ostroh in the Polish–Lithuanian Commonwealth (modern-day Ukraine) by Ivan Fyodorov.
- July 24 – Portuguese succession crisis of 1580: António, Prior of Crato, a grandson of the late King Manuel by Manuel's second son, the Duke of Beja is proclaimed King of Portugal by his supporters in the city of Santarém, and popular acclamation follows in Lisbon and other locations. Portugal's parliament, the Cortes, refuses to acknowledge Antonio and he is defeated 32 days later at Alcântara.
- August 25 – Battle of Alcântara: Spanish armies, led by Fernando Álvarez de Toledo, defending the claim of King Philip II of Spain to the Portuguese throne, defeat the armies of Portuguese claimant António, Prior of Crato.
- September 26 – Francis Drake returns to Plymouth, England from his voyage of circumnavigation (westbound) on the Golden Hind, the second completed in a continuous voyage, and the first under its original commander.
- September 29 – Five of the seven provinces of the Dutch Republic (with the exception of Zeeland and Holland) sign the Treaty of Plessis-les-Tours, recognizing Francis, Duke of Anjou as the Republic's sovereign.

=== October–December ===
- October 4 – Lorenzo Suárez de Mendoza, the Spanish Count of Coruña, arrives in Mexico City to take office as the Viceroy of New Spain, administering Mexico and Central America on behalf of King Philip II.
- October 15 (5th waning of Tazaungmon 942 ME) – King Bayinnaung of Burma dispatches a naval force of 200 ships and 8,000 soldiers to invade the Kingdom of Mrauk U (now in the Rakhine State of Myanmar), but the attempt fails after a year. Burmese troops are ordered withdrawn after Bayinnaung dies and is succeeded by his son Nanda Bayin.
- October 18 – The Siege of Steenwijk in the Dutch Republic is started by the Spanish Netherlands. The siege will last four months and the Spanish troops will capture Steenwijk on February 23.
- October 24 – The War of the Portuguese Succession comes to an end as Spanish forces crush the final Portuguese resistance in the last stronghold in mainland Portugal, Porto. For the next 60 years, Portugal will be ruled by the Kings of Spain.
- November 10 – Second Desmond Rebellion: The Siege of Smerwick (now Ard na Caithne in County Kerry, Ireland) ends after three days when their commander surrenders to the English. Members of a group of at least 400 freelance soldiers, and perhaps as many as 700, for the Papal States are summarily executed on orders of the English Lord Deputy of Ireland, Baron Grey de Wilton.
- December 31 – James Douglas, 4th Earl of Morton, formerly the regent for King James VI of Scotland, is arrested during a meeting of Scotland's Privy Council at Holyrood on the accusation of James Stewart, Earl of Arran that the Earl of Morton had participated in the 1567 murder of Lord Darnley, husband of Mary, Queen of Scots and father of King James. Morton is taken to Dumbarton Castle and convicted of conspiracy to murder, and executed on June 2.

=== Date unknown ===
- The Billy Mitchell volcano, on the island of Bougainville, undergoes a catastrophic eruption (VEI 6).
- The first session of the Jewish Vaad (Council of Four Lands) is held in Lublin, Poland; 70 delegates of Jewish local qahals meet to discuss taxation, and other issues important to Jewish communities.
- The Old City of Zamość is established in Poland, by Jan Zamoyski.
- The 1580 influenza pandemic sweeps the world, starting in Asia and moving rapidly through Africa, Europe, and eventually the Americas. More than 10% of the population of Rome dies, and whole towns in Spain are depopulated.
- In Southern India, Ibrahim Adil Shah II becomes the new Sultan of Bijapur upon the death of his father, Ali Adil Shah I.

== Births ==
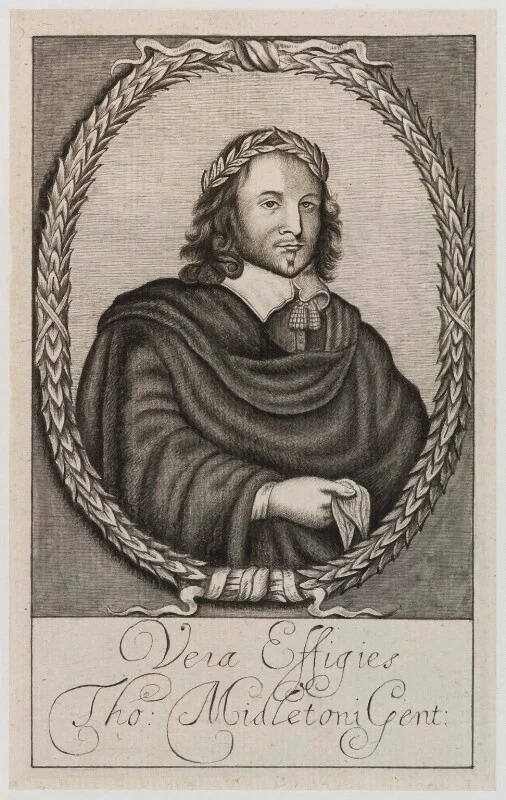
Thomas Middleton

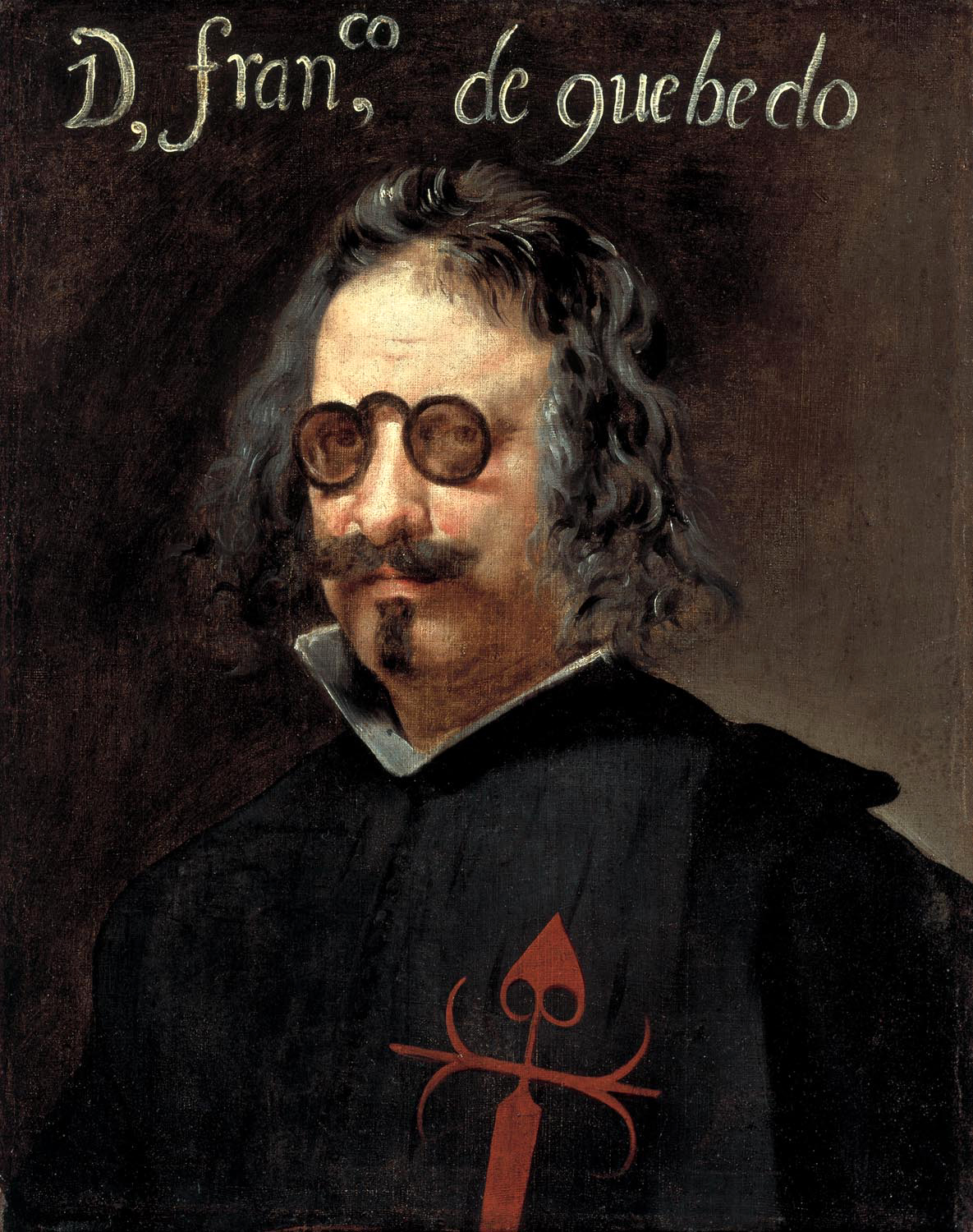
Francisco de Quevedo

- January 8 – Jens Hermansson Juel, Stattholder of Norway (d. 1634)
- January 12
  - Jan Baptist van Helmont, Flemish chemist (d. 1644)
  - Alexander Ruthven, Scottish earl (d. 1600)
- January 20 – Stefano Amadei, Italian painter (d. 1644)
- January 29 – Willem Isaacsz Swanenburg, Dutch engraver (d. 1612)
- January 30 – Gundakar, Prince of Liechtenstein, court official in Vienna (d. 1658)
- January – John Smith, English explorer and Virginia settler (d. 1631)
- February – John Digby, 1st Earl of Bristol, English diplomat (d. 1653)
- February 1 – Francis Fane, 1st Earl of Westmorland, English noble (d. 1629)
- February 2 – Jens Bjelke, Norwegian noble (d. 1659)
- February 22 – Charles de l'Aubespine, marquis de Châteauneuf, French diplomat and government official (d. 1653)
- February 24 – Matthias Hoe von Hoenegg, German theologian (d. 1645)
- February 28
  - Orazio Giustiniani, Italian Catholic cardinal (d. 1649)
  - Giovanni Srofenaur, Italian musician (d. 1634)
- March 31 – Bogislaw XIV, Duke of Pomerania (d. 1637)
- April 8
  - Augusta of Denmark, Duchess Consort of Holstein-Gottorp (1596-1616) (d. 1639)
  - William Herbert, 3rd Earl of Pembroke, English noble, courtier and patron of the arts (d. 1630)
- April 18 – (baptism) Thomas Middleton, English playwright (d. 1627)
- April 24 – Miguel Avellán, Spanish Catholic prelate, Auxiliary Bishop of Toledo from 1633 (d. 1650)
- May 5
  - Johann Faulhaber, German mathematician (d. 1635)
  - Richard Webb, English settler in America (d. 1665)
- May 6 – Charles Gonzaga, Duke of Mantua and Montferrat, French noble (d. 1637)
- May 14 – Bassam Al-Soukaria, Lebanese army commander (d. 1667)
- May 30 – Fadrique de Toledo, 1st Marquis of Villanueva de Valdueza, Spanish noble and admiral (d. 1634)
- June 6 – Godefroy Wendelin, Flemish astronomer (d. 1667)
- June 9 – Daniel Heinsius, Dutch scholar (d. 1655)
- June 12 – Adriaan van Stalbemt, Flemish Baroque painter (d. 1662)
- June 14 – Elisabeth Magdalena of Pomerania, German duchess (d. 1649)
- June 26
  - Gaspar de Borja y Velasco, Spanish Catholic cardinal (d. 1645)
  - Peter Claver, Spanish Jesuit priest (d. 1654)
- July 5 – Carlo Contarini, Doge of Venice (d. 1656)
- July 6 – Johann Stobäus, German composer (d. 1646)
- July 10 – Humphrey Chetham, English merchant (d. 1653)
- July 18 – Giovanni Giacomo Semenza, Italian painter (d. 1638)
- July 29 – Francesco Mochi, Italian early-Baroque sculptor (d. 1654)
- August 2 – Prince Jeongwon, Korean prince (d. 1619)
- August 19 – Pierre Vernier, French mathematician (d. 1637)
- September 4 – George Percy, English explorer (d. 1632)
- September 14
  - Francisco de Quevedo, Spanish writer (d. 1645)
  - Robert Gordon of Straloch, Scottish cartographer (d. 1661)
- September 15
  - Charles Annibal Fabrot, French lawyer (d. 1659)
  - Thomas Fanshawe, English politician (d. 1631)
- September 17 – Countess Charlotte Brabantina of Nassau, Belgian noble (d. 1631)
- September 24 – Elisabeth of Schleswig-Holstein-Sonderburg, Duchess consort of Pomerania (d. 1653)
- October 8 – Gábor Esterházy (1580–1626), Hungarian noble (d. 1626)
- October 12 – Hortensio Félix Paravicino, Spanish preacher and poet from the noble house of Pallavicini (d. 1633)
- October 20 – Peter Crüger, German astronomer and mathematician (d. 1639)
- October 30 – Armand-Nompar de Caumont, duc de La Force, Marshal of France (d. 1675)
- November 9 – Johannes Narssius, Dutch physician and poet (d. 1637)
- December 1 – Nicolas-Claude Fabri de Peiresc, French astronomer (d. 1637)
- December 4
  - Samuel Argall, English adventurer and naval officer (d. 1626)
  - Nabeshima Katsushige, Japanese daimyō (d. 1657)
- date unknown
  - Philipp Clüver, German geographer and historian (d. 1623)
  - Francesco Fontana, Italian lawyer and astronomer (d. 1656)
  - Dirk Hartog, Dutch ship's captain and explorer (d. 1621)
  - Jean Jannon, Swiss-born typefounder (d. 1658)
  - Robert Killigrew, English courtier, politician, ambassador and knight (d. 1633)
  - Willebrord Snellius, Dutch astronomer and mathematician (d. 1626)
  - Raphael Sobiehrd-Mnishovsky, Bohemian lawyer and writer (d. 1644)
  - Pierre Vernier, French mathematician and instrument inventor (d. 1637)
  - Krzysztof Zbaraski, Polish nobleman (d. 1627)
  - George Calvert, 1st Baron Baltimore, English politician and colonizer (d. 1623)
- probable
  - William Brabazon, 1st Earl of Meath, English noble (d. 1651)
  - Edward Fairfax, English translator (d. 1635)
  - Frans Hals, Dutch painter (d. 1666)
  - Alexander Leslie, 1st Earl of Leven, Scottish soldier (d. 1661)
  - Benjamin, Duke of Soubise, French Huguenot leader (d. 1642)
  - Adriana Basile, Italian composer (d. 1640)

== Deaths ==
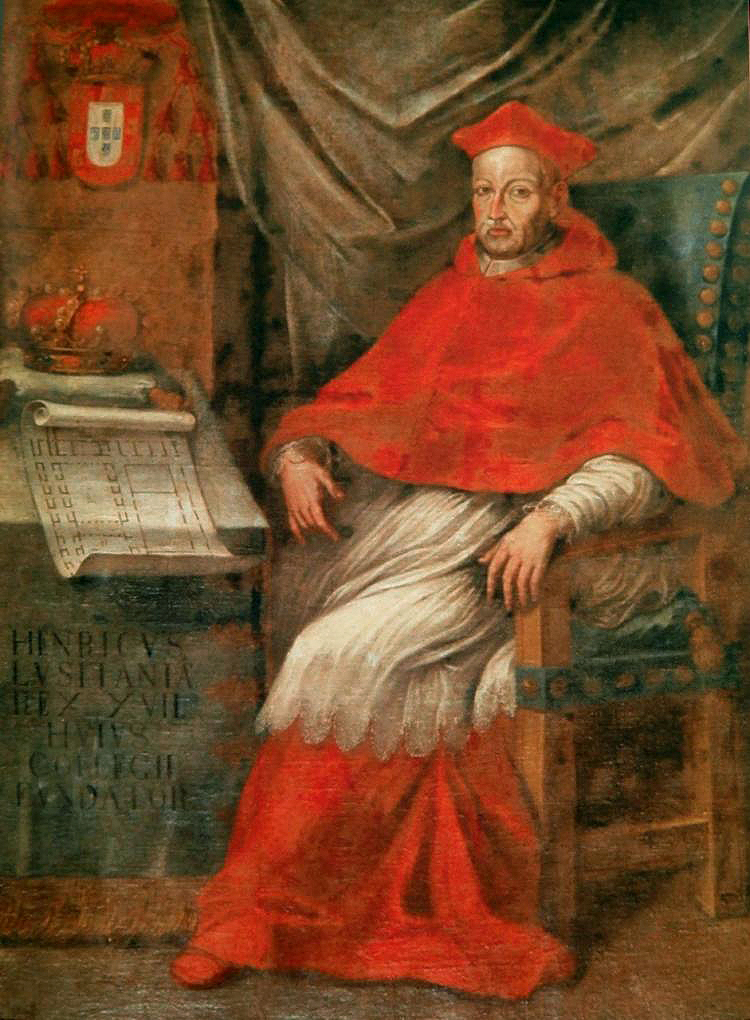
Henry, King of Portugal

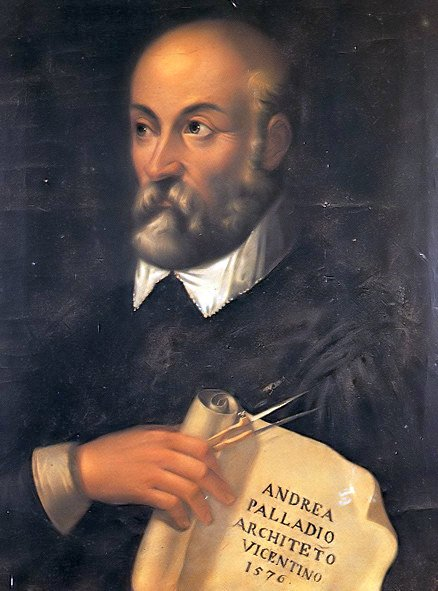
Andrea Palladio

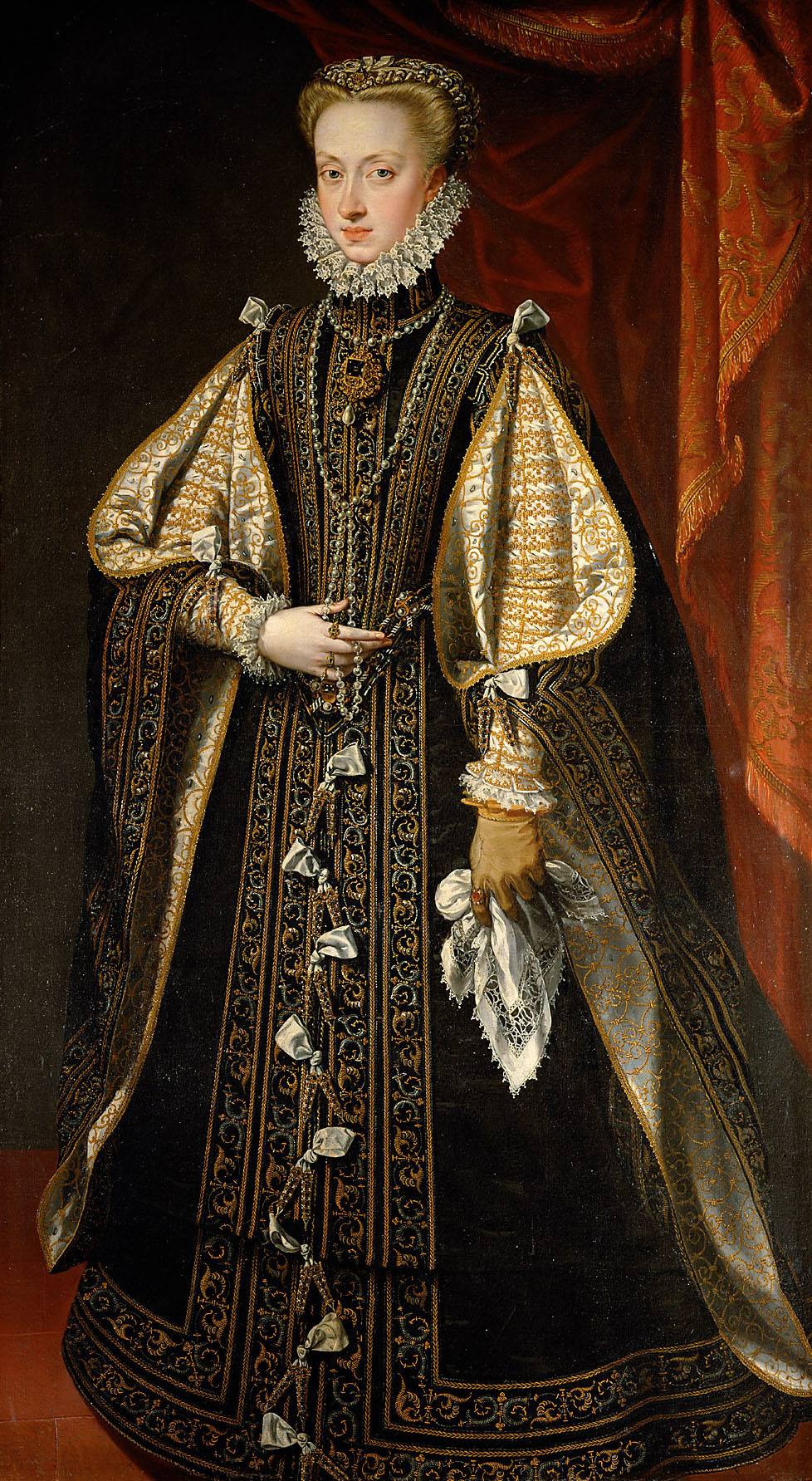
Anna of Austria

- January 5 – Anna Sibylle of Hanau-Lichtenberg, German noblewoman (b. 1542)
- January 18
  - Antonio Scandello, Italian composer (b. 1517)
  - Archangelo de' Bianchi, Italian Catholic cardinal (b. 1516)
- January 31 – King Henry of Portugal (b. 1512)
- February 2 – Bessho Nagaharu, Japanese retainer (b. 1558)
- February 24 – Henry FitzAlan, 19th Earl of Arundel, English nobleman (b. 1511)
- April 20 – Francesco Alciati, Italian Catholic cardinal (b. 1522)
- May 3 – Thomas Tusser, English poet and farmer (b. c. 1524)
- May 31 – Dorothea of Denmark, Electress Palatine, Princess of Denmark, Sweden and Norway (b. 1520)
- June 10 – Luís de Camões, Portuguese poet (b. c. 1524)
- June 18 – Juliana of Stolberg, German countess (b. 1506)
- August 1 – Albrecht Giese, German politician and diplomat (b. 1524)
- August 12 – Luca Longhi, Italian painter (b. 1507)
- August 15 – Vincenzo Borghini, Italian monk (b. 1515)
- August 19 – Andrea Palladio, Italian architect (b. 1508)
- August 20 – Jerónimo Osório, Portuguese historian (b. 1506)
- August 28 – Antonín Brus of Mohelnice, Moravian Catholic archbishop (b. 1518)
- August 30 – Emmanuel Philibert, Duke of Savoy (b. 1528)
- September 19 – Catherine Brandon, Duchess of Suffolk, English noblewoman (b. 1519)
- September 20 – Honorat II of Savoy, French Navy admiral (b. 1511)
- September – Anne de Pisseleu d'Heilly, French royal mistress and cultural patron (b. 1508)
- October 1 – John II, Duke of Schleswig-Holstein-Haderslev (b. 1521)
- October 5 – Matsudaira Shigeyoshi, Japanese general (b. 1493)
- October 8 – Hieronymus Wolf, German historian (b. 1516)
- October 26 – Anna of Austria, Queen of Spain (b. 1549)
- November 3 – Jerónimo Zurita y Castro, Spanish historian (b. 1512)
- November 16 – Marie of Baden-Sponheim, German noblewoman (b. 1507)
- November 30 – Richard Farrant, English composer (b. 1530)
- December 1 – Giovanni Morone, Italian Catholic cardinal (b. 1509)
- date unknown
  - Giovanni Filippo Ingrassia, Italian anatomist (b. 1545)
  - Ruy López de Segura, Spanish priest and writer on chess (b. 1530)
  - Inés de Suárez, Spanish conquistadora (b. 1507)
  - Lucrezia Galletta, Italian courtesan and banker
- possible date
  - John Heywood, English dramatist (b. 1497)
  - Robert Lindsay of Pitscottie, Scottish chronicler (b. c. 1532)
