= 1651 in Spain =

- Decades: 1630s; 1640s; 1650s; 1660s; 1670s
- See also: History of Spain; Timeline of Spanish history; List of years in Spain

The following are events that took place in 1651 in Spain.

== Incumbents ==
- Monarch: Philip IV

== Events ==
- July: Start of the Siege of Barcelona during the Reapers' War

== Births ==
- Antonio Arbiol y Díez, Franciscan and painter (d. 1726)
- Manuel de Oms, 1st Marquis of Castelldosrius, diplomat, man of letters, Viceroy of Peru. (d. 1710)
- Cristóbal Hernández de Quintana, baroque painter (d. 1725)
- July 12 – Margaret Theresa of Spain, Holy Roman Empress (d. 1673)
- December 25 - Pedro Manuel Colón de Portugal, 7th Duke of Veragua, (d. 1710)

== Deaths ==
- Luis Quiñones de Benavente, entremesista
- October 17 – Hernando de Lobo Castrillo, bishop of Puerto Rico
