= 1629 in Spain =

- Decades: 1600s; 1610s; 1620s; 1630s; 1640s
- See also: History of Spain; Timeline of Spanish history; List of years in Spain

Events in the year 1629 in Spain.

== Incumbents ==
- King: Philip IV

== Events ==
- April 30 – Eighty Years' War: Frederick Henry of Orange lays siege to the Spanish fort 's-Hertogenbosch.
- June 17 – Anglo-Spanish War (1625): A Spanish expedition led by Fadrique de Toledo Battle of St. Kitts (1629) destroy the English colony on Nevis.
- August 19 – Eighty Years' War: Anglo-Spanish War (1625–1630): A Spanish expedition led by Fadrique de Toledo Battle of St. Kitts (1629) destroy the English colony on St. Kitts.
- September 14 – Eighty Years' War: After a 5 month long siege, 's-Hertogenbosch surrenders to Frederick Henry, Prince of Orange. .
- The Spanish Fort Santo Domingo is built in Formosa.

== Births ==
- April 7 – John of Austria the Younger, Spanish general (d. 1679)
