= 1636 in Spain =

- Decades: 1610s; 1620s; 1630s; 1640s; 1650s
- See also: History of Spain; Timeline of Spanish history; List of years in Spain

Events from the year 1636 in Spain

== Incumbents ==
- Monarch – Philip IV

== Events ==
- June 22 - Battle of Tornavento
- August 15 - Spanish Siege of Corbie in France.
- Franco-Spanish war

== Births ==
- Diego Ortiz de Zuniga

== Deaths ==
- Francisco Verdugo Cabrera
- Antonio de Morga
