= 1632 in Spain =

- Decades: 1610s; 1620s; 1630s; 1640s; 1650s
- See also: History of Spain; Timeline of Spanish history; List of years in Spain

Events from the year 1632 in Spain

== Incumbents ==
- Monarch – Philip IV

== Births ==
- 11 February – Francisco de Aguiar y Seijas

== Deaths ==
- July 22 – Juan Niño de Tabora, Spanish general and governor of the Philippines (date of birth unknown)
