= 1633 in Spain =

- Decades: 1610s; 1620s; 1630s; 1640s; 1650s
- See also: History of Spain; Timeline of Spanish history; List of years in Spain

Events from the year 1633 in Spain

== Incumbents ==
- Monarch – Philip IV

== Events ==
- Siege of Rheinfelden (1633)

== Births ==
- - Juan Antonio de Frías y Escalante

== Deaths ==
- - Ana de Mendoza y Enríquez de Cabrera, 6th Duchess of the Infantado (b. 1554)
