= 1640 in Spain =

- Decades: 1620s; 1630s; 1640s; 1650s; 1660s
- See also: History of Spain; Timeline of Spanish history; List of years in Spain

Events in the year 1640 in Spain.

== Incumbents ==
- Monarch - Philip IV

== Events ==
- May - beginning of the Catalan Revolt
- September - Royal army occupies Tortosa
- December 8 - a large Royal army under Pedro Fajardo de Zúñiga y Requesens headed for Barcelona, passing through Cambrils.
- December 13–16 - Catalan Revolt: Battle of Cambrils. Catalan rebels massacred by Royal army after surrender
- December 24 - Royal army takes Tarragona

== Deaths ==
- June 7 - Dalmau de Queralt, Count of Santa Coloma, Viceroy of Catalonia, assassinated
- December 16 - Antoni d'Armengol, Jacint Vilosa, Carles Bertrolà i de Caldés, Catalan Revolt leaders at Cambrils, execution by garrote
