= 1642 in Spain =

- Decades: 1620s; 1630s; 1640s; 1650s; 1660s
- See also: History of Spain; Timeline of Spanish history; List of years in Spain

Events in the year 1642 in Spain.

== Incumbents ==
- Monarch - Philip IV

== Events ==
- March 4 - Siege of São Filipe near Angra do Heroismo in Azores ends with Portuguese victory
- March 28 - Catalan Revolt: Battle of Montmeló
- June 29-July 3 - Battle of Barcelona
- August - The Dutch drive the Spanish out of their colony of Spanish Formosa and regain control. Sebastián Hurtado de Corcuera, governor of the Philippines, is blamed for the loss of Formosa and eventually tried in court for his actions.
- September 9 - Siege of Perpignan (1642). 500 Spanish survive out of original garrison of 3,000
- October 7 - Battle of Lerida (1642)

== Deaths ==
- November 5 - Luis de Valdivia, Jesuit missionary (born 1560)
