= 1641 in Spain =

- Decades: 1620s; 1630s; 1640s; 1650s; 1660s
- See also: History of Spain; Timeline of Spanish history; List of years in Spain

Events in the year 1641 in Spain.

== Incumbents ==
- Monarch - Philip IV

== Events ==
- January 17 - Catalan Revolt: Proclamation of the Catalan Republic
- January 26 - Catalan Revolt: Battle of Montjuïc (1641)
- March 27 - Portuguese Restoration War: beginning of the Siege of São Filipe near Angra do Heroismo in Azores
- July 4–6 - Naval Battle of Tarragona (July 1641)
- August 20–25 - Battle of Tarragona (August 1641)
- Andalusian independentist conspiracy (1641)
- November 4 - Franco-Spanish War (1635–1659): beginning of the Siege of Perpignan (1642)

== Deaths ==
- November 9 - Cardinal-Infante Ferdinand of Austria, younger brother of Philip IV (b. 1609 or 1610)
