= 1644 in Spain =

- Decades: 1620s; 1630s; 1640s; 1650s; 1660s
- See also: History of Spain; Timeline of Spanish history; List of years in Spain

Events in the year 1644 in Spain.

== Incumbents ==
- King: Philip IV

== Events ==
- May 26 - Portuguese Restoration War: Battle of Montijo
