= 1645 in Spain =

- Decades: 1620s; 1630s; 1640s; 1650s; 1660s
- See also: History of Spain; Timeline of Spanish history; List of years in Spain

Events from the year 1645 in Spain.

== Incumbents ==
- Monarch: Philip IV

== Deaths ==
- September 8 - Francisco de Quevedo, nobleman, politician and writer (born 1580)
- December 28 - Gaspar de Borja y Velasco (born 1580)
