= 1626 in Spain =

- Decades: 1600s; 1610s; 1620s; 1630s; 1640s
- See also: History of Spain; Timeline of Spanish history; List of years in Spain

Events in the year 1626 in Spain.

== Incumbents ==
- King: Philip IV

== Art & Literature ==
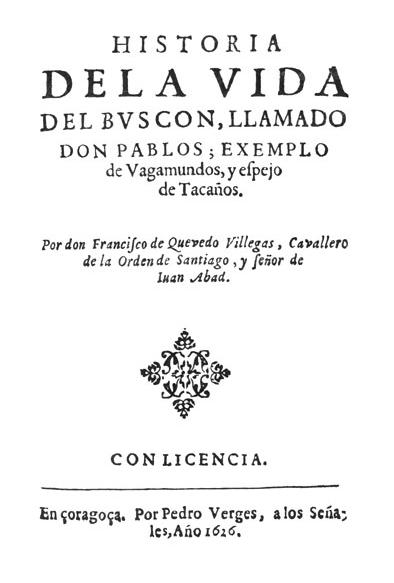
El Buscón, 1626 cover

- El Buscón by Francisco de Quevedo is published without Quevedo's permission. Previously, it had circulated in manuscript form.

== Deaths ==
- October 2 – Diego Sarmiento de Acuña, conde de Gondomar, Spanish diplomat (born 1567)
