= 1648 in Spain =

- Decades: 1620s; 1630s; 1640s; 1650s; 1660s
- See also: History of Spain; Timeline of Spanish history; List of years in Spain

Events from the year 1648 in Spain

== Incumbents ==
- Monarch – Philip IV

== Events ==
- - May 15, Peace of Münster
- - August 20, Battle of Lens

== Deaths ==
- - January 23, Francisco de Rojas Zorrilla, Playwright (Age 40)
- - March 12, Tirso de Molina, Poet and Monk (Age 63)
