= 1567 in Spain =

- Decades: 1540s; 1550s; 1560s; 1570s; 1580s
- See also: History of Spain; Timeline of Spanish history; List of years in Spain

Events in the year 1567 in Spain.

== Incumbents ==
- Monarch: Philip II

== Births ==
- November 1 - Diego Sarmiento de Acuña, 1st Count of Gondomar, Spanish diplomat, ambassador to England 1613-1622 (d. 1626)
