= Antonio Arbiol y Díez =

Spanish franciscan and writer

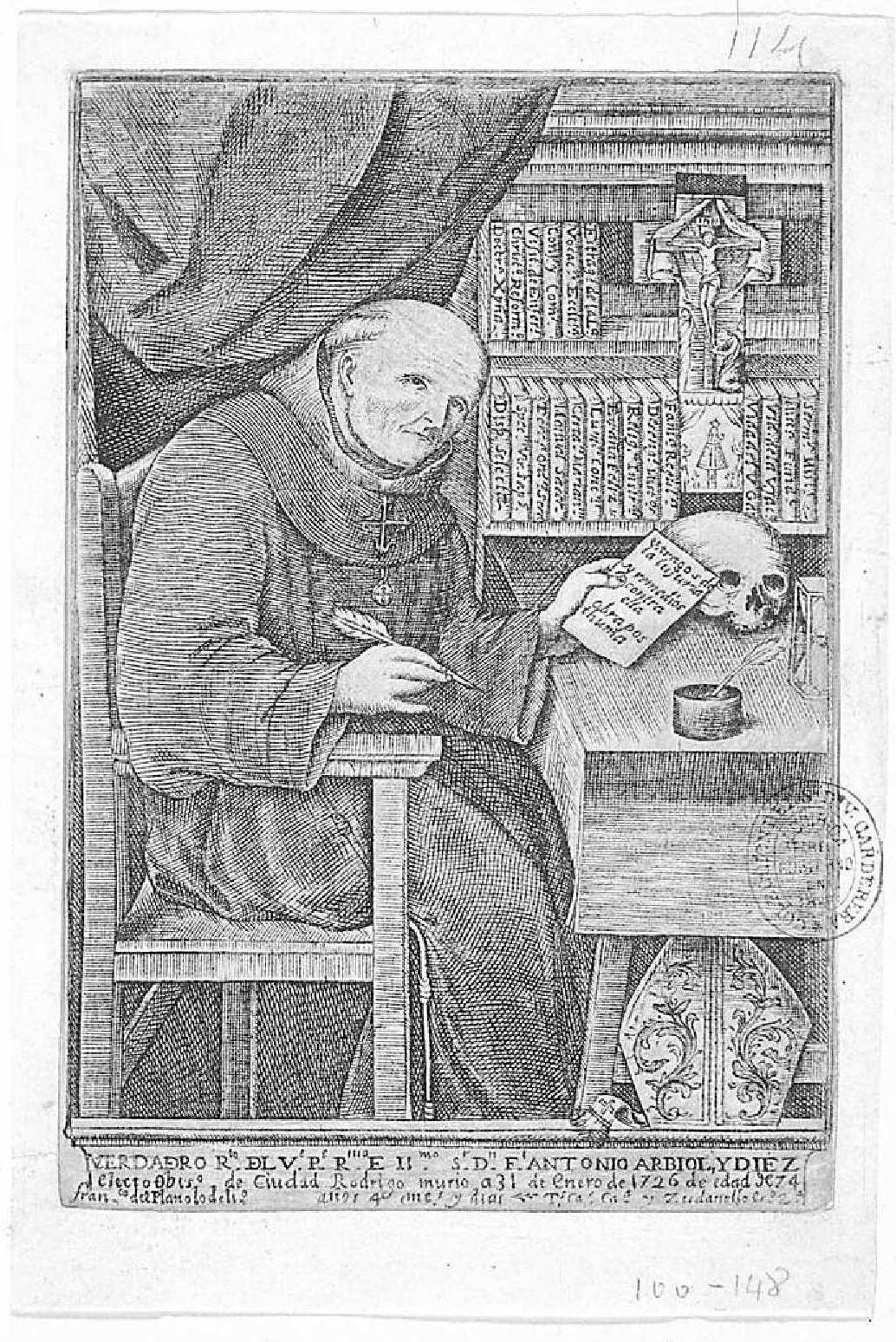
Portrait of Antonio Arbiol

Antonio Arbiol y Díez (Torrellas, Zaragoza), 1651 – Zaragoza, January 31, 1726) was a Spanish Franciscan and moralistic writer. His works include topics such as the task of comforting the sick, or the education of children, and offer moral advice.

== Works ==
- Manuale sacerdotum. 1693. Manual para que sacerdotes aprendan a predicar.
- La Venerable y esclarecida Orden Tercera de San Francisco. 1697. Historia de la orden de San Francisco, de la que evalúa los "principios, leyes, reglas, ejercicios y vidas de sus principales santos."
- Desengaños místicos. 1706. Sobre los errores cometidos durante la oración, esquema de teología, y errores en la espiritualidad.
- El cristiano reformado. 1714. Sobre los ejercicios y devociones de la Tercera Orden.
- La familia regulada con doctrina de la Sagrada Escritura. 1715
- La religiosa instruida. 1717.
- Visita de enfermos y exercicio santo de ayudar a bien morir. 1722.
- Estragos de la lujuria y sus remedios conforme a las Divinas Escrituras. 1726.
