= Johann Daniel Major =

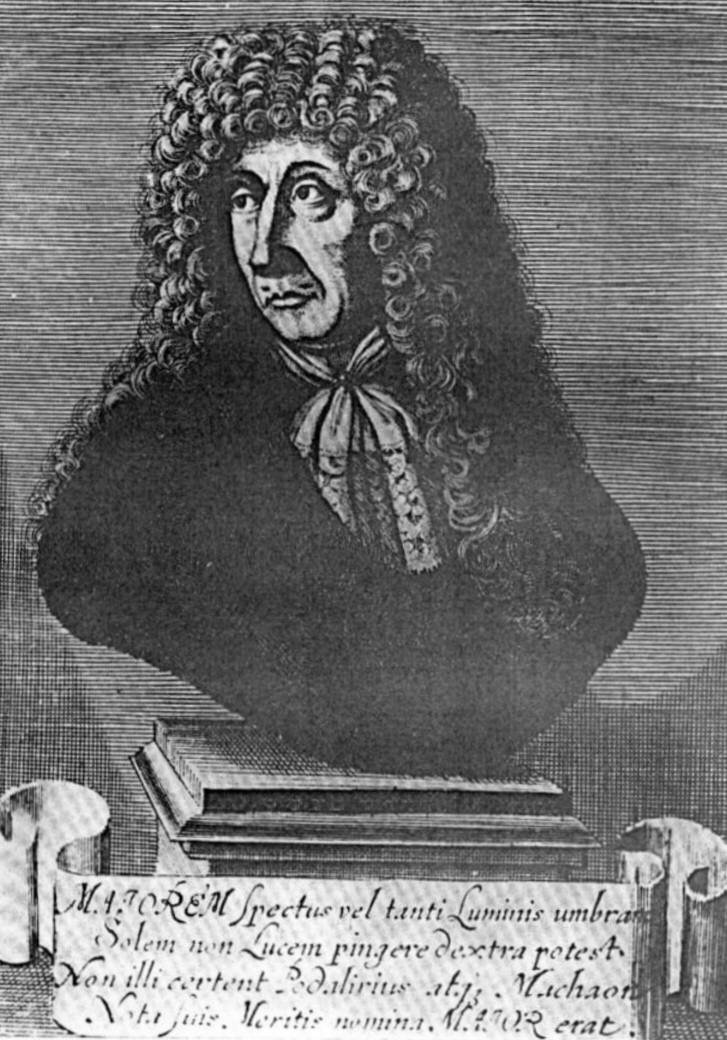
Portrait of Major

Johann Daniel Major (16 August 1634 – 26 July 1693) was a German professor of theoretical medicine, naturalist, collector and the founder of museology.

== Life ==
Johann Daniel Major was born on 16 August 1634 in Breslau, Kingdom of Bohemia (today Wrocław, Poland). From 1654 to 1658, he studied at the University of Wittenberg and in 1659 graduated as a magister medicine at the University of Wittenberg and journeyed to Italy gaining from the University of Padua another degree for a dissertation "Description of the bird Albatros and other curious observations". From 1661 to 1663, he practiced as a physician in Wittenberg moving in 1663 to Hamburg, where he was a plague physician and wrote medical publications. In 1666 he conducted the first public dissection of a human corpse now in Kiel. Four years later in 1667, he was appointed supervisor of the botanic garden of the University of Kiel. From 1673 to 1682, he devoted himself to also antiquities and natural history making large collections and from 1685 to 1692 founded the Museum of the Cimbrici conducting archaeological excavations and studying the regions fauna and flora.

Major was called to Sweden for the treatment of the queen, but he caught her infection, which killed him. He died in Stockholm on 26 July 1693.

== Works ==
Major was a polymath and his works include varios topics.

- Übersetzung und Herausgabe René Decartes Explicatio (1672)
- Festrede auf Kaiser Leopold zur Befreiung Wiens (1684)
- Laurifolia Veneta. Epigramme aus dem Stegreif zum Lobe Venedigs Padua (1660)
- Epistola de oraculis medicinae Wittenberg (1663)
- Prodromus Chirurgiae Infusoriae Leipzig (1664)
- Der ersten Kieler Anatomie vorher angekündigtes Programm über den menschlichen Körper Kiel (1666)
- Programm einer Vorlesung über Botanik Kiel (1667)
- Memoriale Anatomico-miscellanum Kiel (1669) (Description of his anatomy collection);
- Denkschrift über den neu errichteten Botanischen Garten an der Universität Kiel Kiel (1669)
- Renati Descartes Explicatio machinarum vel instrumentorum Kiel (1672)
- Katalog der Pflanzen Kiel (1673)
- Catalogus oder Index Alphabeticus von Kunst, Antiquitäten, Schatz und fürnehmlich Naturalien-Kammern, Conclavia, Musea, Repositoria, oder auch nur kleinere Serinia Rerum Naturalium Selectorum Kiel (1674)
- Unvorgreiffliches Bedenken von Kunst und Naturalienkammern insgemein Kiel (1674)
- Vorstellung etlicher Kunst und Naturalienkammern in Africa und an den Gränzen Europae Kiel (1674)
- Vorstellung etlicher Kunst und Naturalienkammern in America und Asia Kiel (1674)
- Vorstellung etlicher Kunst und Naturalienkammern in Italien, zu Neapol und Alt Rom Kiel (1675)
- Genius errans sive De Ingeniorum in scientiis abusu dissertatio Kiel (1677)
- Der irrende Genius oder über den Missbrauch des Talents in der Wissenschaft Kiel (1678)
- Grosser Reichtum zusammengebracht aus den meisten Schätzen der Welt, oder Poetischer Interims Diskurs von Kunst und Naturalien Kammern, einem dergleichen Dinge wohlerfahrenen guten Freude zugeeignet Kiel (1679)
- Vermutungen über eine Münze des sächsischen Königs Otto Kiel (1682)
- Über Münzen mit griechischen Inschriften Kiel (1685)
- Kurzer Vorbericht, betreffend D. Johann Daniel Majors Museum Cimbricum oder insgemein so-gennate Kunst Kammer mit darzugehörigen Conferenz-Saal Plön (1688)
- Musei Cimbrici cum contentis in eo rebus selectioribus privatim declarandi, Kiel (1689)
