= 1634 =

1634 in various calendars
- Gregorian calendar: 1634; MDCXXXIV
- Ab urbe condita: 2387
- Armenian calendar: 1083; ԹՎ ՌՁԳ
- Assyrian calendar: 6384
- Balinese saka calendar: 1555–1556
- Bengali calendar: 1040–1041
- Berber calendar: 2584
- English Regnal year: 9 Cha. 1 – 10 Cha. 1
- Buddhist calendar: 2178
- Burmese calendar: 996
- Byzantine calendar: 7142–7143
- Chinese calendar: 癸酉年 (Water Rooster); 4331 or 4124 — to — 甲戌年 (Wood Dog); 4332 or 4125
- Coptic calendar: 1350–1351
- Discordian calendar: 2800
- Ethiopian calendar: 1626–1627
- Hebrew calendar: 5394–5395
- Hindu calendars
- Vikram Samvat: 1690–1691
- Shaka Samvat: 1555–1556
- Kali Yuga: 4734–4735
- Holocene calendar: 11634
- Igbo calendar: 634–635
- Iranian calendar: 1012–1013
- Islamic calendar: 1043–1044
- Japanese calendar: Kan'ei 11 (寛永１１年)
- Javanese calendar: 1555–1556
- Julian calendar: Gregorian minus 10 days
- Korean calendar: 3967
- Minguo calendar: 278 before ROC 民前278年
- Nanakshahi calendar: 166
- Thai solar calendar: 2176–2177
- Tibetan calendar: ཆུ་མོ་བྱ་ལོ་ (female Water-Bird); 1760 or 1379 or 607 — to — ཤིང་ཕོ་ཁྱི་ལོ་ (male Wood-Dog); 1761 or 1380 or 608

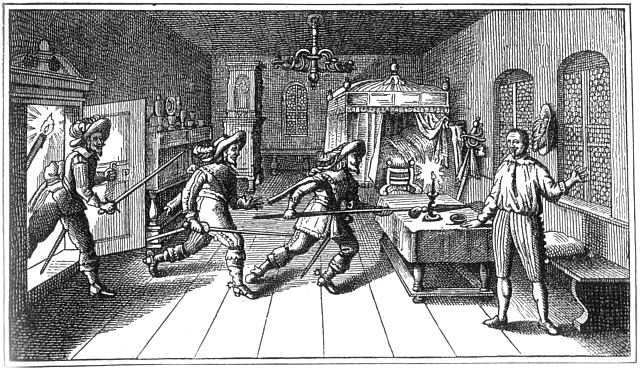
February 25: Albrecht von Wallenstein, dismissed as the supreme commander of the Army of the Holy Roman Emperor, is assassinated.

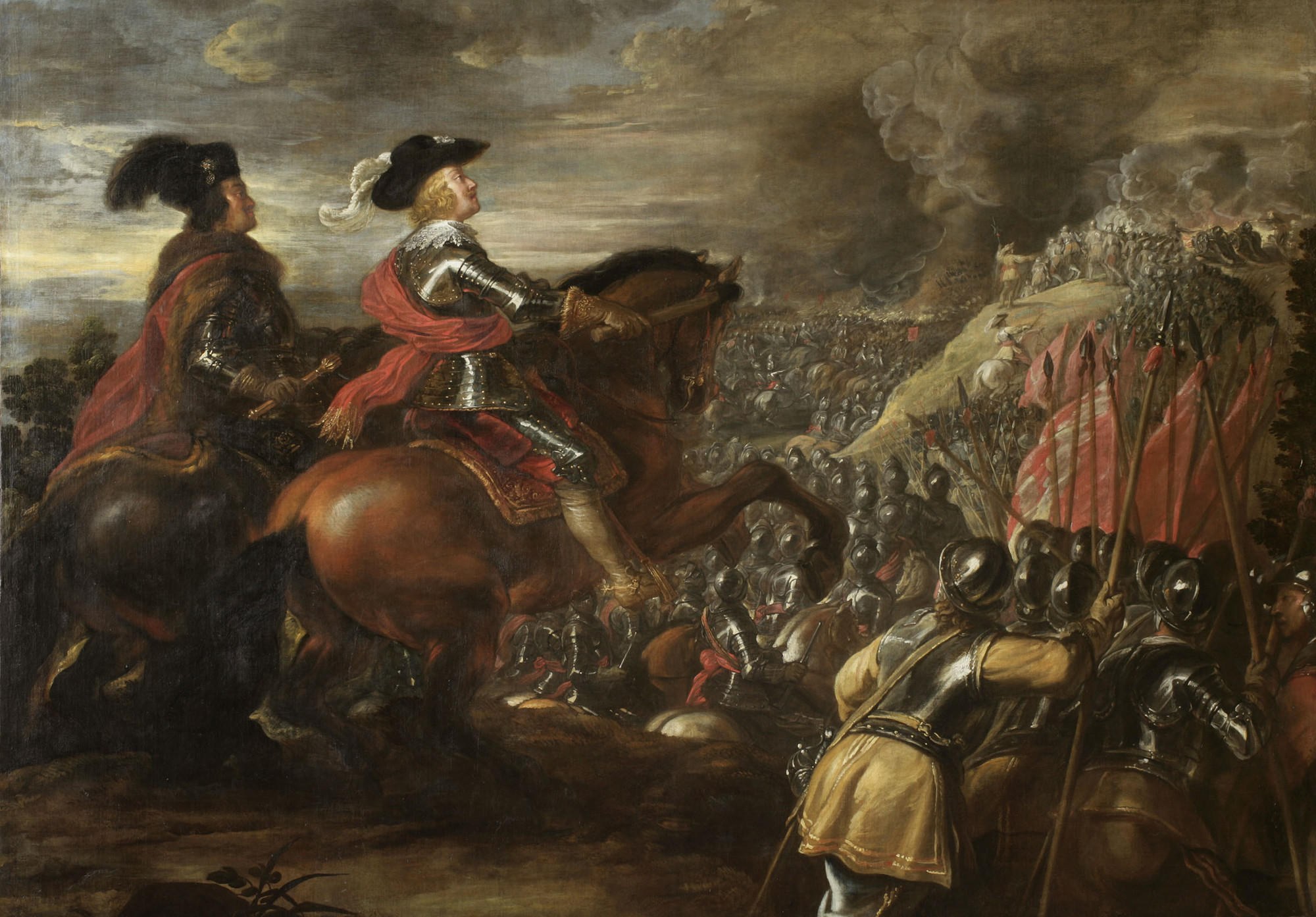
September 6: The Imperial army defeats the Army of Sweden at the Battle of Nördlingen

1634 (MDCXXXIV) was a common year starting on Sunday of the Gregorian calendar and a common year starting on Wednesday of the Julian calendar, the 1634th year of the Common Era (CE) and Anno Domini (AD) designations, the 634th year of the 2nd millennium, the 34th year of the 17th century, and the 5th year of the 1630s decade. As of the start of 1634, the Gregorian calendar was 10 days ahead of the Julian calendar, which remained in localized use until 1923.

== Events ==
=== January–March ===
- January 12 – After suspecting that he will be dismissed, Albrecht von Wallenstein, supreme commander of the Holy Roman Empire's Army, demands that his colonels sign a declaration of personal loyalty.
- January 14 – France's Compagnie normande obtains a one-year monopoly on trade with the African kingdoms in Guinea.
- January 19 – Charles IV, Duke of Lorraine abdicates in favor of his brother Nicholas II, who is only able to hold the duchy for 75 days.
- January 24 – Ferdinand II, Holy Roman Emperor, signs a classified order dismissing Albrecht von Wallenstein, the supreme commander of the Imperial Army.
- February 18 – Emperor Ferdinand II's dismissal of Commander Wallenstein for high treason, and the order for his capture, dead or alive, is made public.
- February 24 – By this date, the Paulaner Brewery is established in Munich, by Minim friars.
- February 25 – Rebel Scots and Irish soldiers assassinate Bohemian military leader Albrecht von Wallenstein at Cheb.
- March 1 – The Russians vacate their camp, ending the Siege of Smolensk.
- March 4 – Belgian scientist Jan Baptist van Helmont is interrogated by the Spanish Inquisition and put under house arrest for his experiments into plant growth.
- March 25 – Leonard Calvert arrives in Maryland, with Jesuit missionaries Andrew White, John Altham Gravenor, and Thomas Gervase, establishing St. Mary's as the fourth permanent settlement in British North America. In this year they also establish an institution of higher learning here, which later becomes Georgetown University, the United States's oldest university.

=== April–June ===
- April 1 – Nicholas II, Duke of Lorraine, who assumed rule of the duchy on January 19 upon the abdication of his older brother Charles IV abdicates in favor of Charles.
- April 14 – The Battle of Amritsar begins in India when Mughal Empire troops attempt to eliminate the Sikh religious leader, Guru Hargobind, by attacking Amritsar. The Sikh defenders hand the Mughal invaders an unprecedented defeat.
- May 2 – With Albrecht Wallenstein having been eliminated, the Holy Roman Emperor Ferdinand II personally takes command of the Imperial Army.
- May 5 – King Charles I of England and Scotland first refers to the banner of the British Isles as the "Union Flag" in a proclamation that the flag shall not be used on any ships other than those "in our immediate Service and Pay, and none other." The term evolves into the description of the British flag as the "Union Jack".
- June 14 – The Treaty of Polyanovka is signed between the Polish–Lithuanian Commonwealth and the Tsardom of Russia, concluding the Smolensk War.
- April – The first performance of the Oberammergau Passion Play is held in Bavaria.

=== July–September ===
- July 4 – The city of Trois-Rivières is founded in New France, in what is the modern-day Canadian province of Quebec.
- July 29 – Curaçao is captured by the Dutch.
- August 18 – In France, Urbain Grandier, accused of wizardry, is burned alive in Loudun.
- August (prob.) – Jean Nicolet becomes the first European to set foot in what becomes the U.S. state of Wisconsin. He is in search of a water-route to the Pacific, when he lands at Green Bay of Lake Michigan.
- September 6 – The Battle of Nördlingen ends after two days with a decisive victory for the Imperial Army and Habsburg Spain over the Army of Sweden and Protestant German troops.
- September 12 – A gunpowder factory explodes in Valletta, Malta, killing 22 people and damaging several buildings.

=== October–December ===
- October 11 – The Burchardi flood (also known as the second Grote Mandrenke) strikes the North Sea coast of Germany and Denmark, causing at least 8,000 deaths and perhaps as many as 12,000.
- November 11 – The Irish House of Commons passes an Act for the Punishment of the Vice of Buggery.
- December 8 – Francesco Niccolini obtains an audience with Pope Urban VIII and pleads him to reconsider the Church's punishment of astronomer Galileo Galilei. The Pope replies that although he esteems Galileo highly, nothing will change.
- December 16 – Gregorio Panzani, an emissary of Pope Urban VIII, is welcomed in England by King Charles I, marking the first time since England's break with the Roman Catholic Church that a monarch has received an agent of the Vatican.

=== Date unknown ===
- The English establish a settlement at Cochin (modern-day Kochi) on the Malabar Coast.
- Suspecting that Patriarch Afonso Mendes played a part in the Portuguese assault on Mombasa, Emperor Fasilides expels him and several Jesuit missionaries from Ethiopia.
- Cardinal Richelieu gathers members for the Académie Française which will be formally established in 1635).
- Moses Amyraut's Traité de la predestination is published.

== Births ==
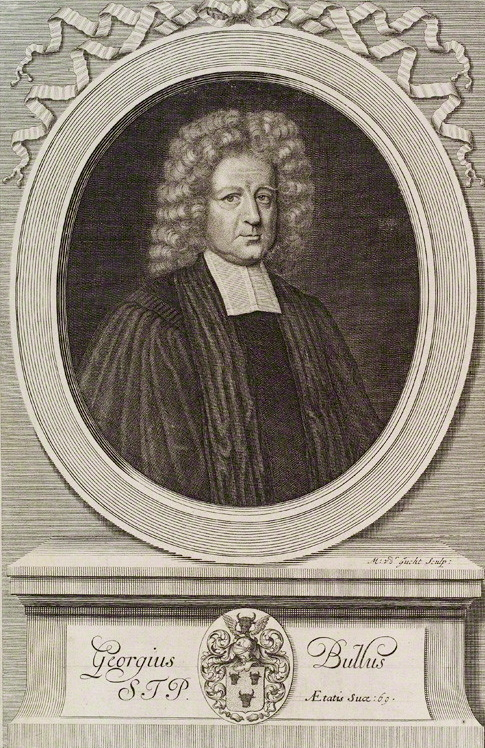
George Bull

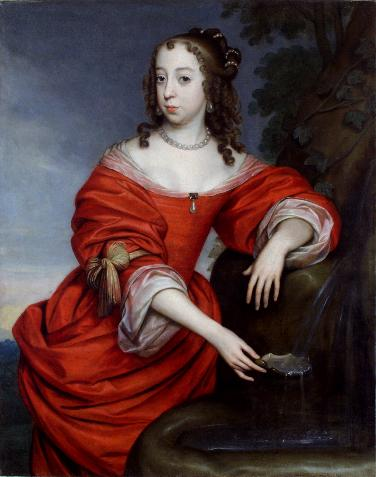
Countess Albertine Agnes of Nassau

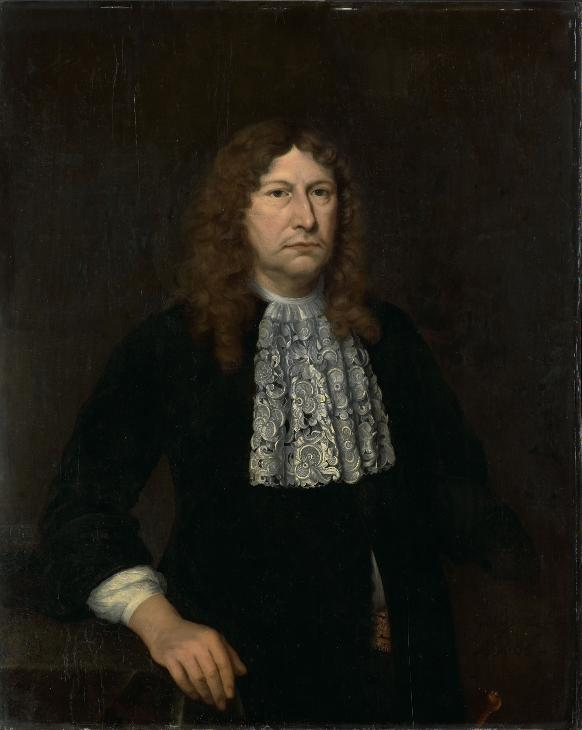
Johannes Camphuys

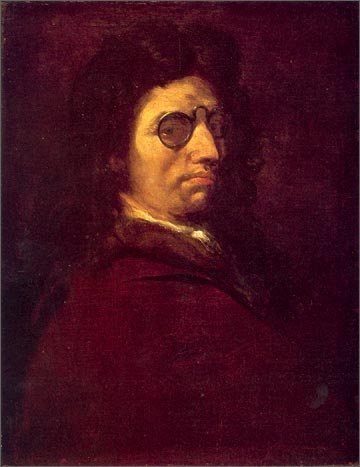
Luca Giordano

=== January–March ===
- January 1 – Fleetwood Sheppard, English poet (d. 1698)
- January 7
  - Sophia Eleonore of Hesse-Darmstadt, Landgravine consort of Hesse-Homburg (d. 1663)
  - Adam Krieger, German composer (d. 1666)
  - Katarzyna Sobieska, Polish noble (d. 1694)
- January 16 – Dorothe Engelbretsdotter, Norway's first professional female author (d. 1716)
- January 25 – Gaspar Fagel, Dutch statesman (d. 1688)
- January 30 – Johann Hugo von Orsbeck, Archbishop-Elector of Trier (d. 1711)
- February 2 – Alfonso IV d'Este, Duke of Modena, Italian noble (d. 1662)
- February 5 – Maria Antonia Scalera Stellini, Italian poet (d. 1704)
- February 6 – George Christian, Prince of East Frisia, prince of Ostfriesland (d. 1665)
- February 7 – Robert Robartes, Viscount Bodmin, English diplomat and politician (d. 1682)
- February 8 – Teodósio, Prince of Brazil, Brazilian prince (d. 1653)
- March 4 – Kazimierz Łyszczyński, Polish philosopher (d. 1689)
- March 11 – Nicholas Gassaway, Colonel, Maryland Provincial Forces (d. 1691)
- March 12 – Cornelis Kick, Dutch painter (d. 1681)
- March 18 – Marie-Madeleine de La Fayette, French novelist (d. 1693)
- March 20 – Balthasar Bekker, Dutch minister and author of philosophical and theological works (d. 1698)
- March 23 – Philip Smythe, 2nd Viscount Strangford, English Member of Parliament (d. 1708)
- March 25 – George Bull, English theologian and Bishop of St David's (d. 1710)
- March 26 – Domenico Freschi, Italian opera composer, Catholic priest (d. 1710)
- March 28 – Sir Richard Temple, 3rd Baronet, English Member of Parliament (d. 1697)

=== April–June ===
- April 3 – Stanisław Jan Jabłonowski, Polish noble (d. 1702)
- April 8
  - John Adolphus, Duke of Schleswig-Holstein-Sonderburg-Plön, German duke (d. 1704)
  - Joseph Alleine, English Nonconformist pastor, author (d. 1668)
- April 9 – Countess Albertine Agnes of Nassau, Regent of Friesland, Groningen and Drenthe (1664–1679) (d. 1696)
- April 14 – Sir John Reresby, 2nd Baronet, 17th-century English politician and diarist (d. 1689)
- April 25 – Robert Montagu, 3rd Earl of Manchester, English politician (d. 1683)
- May 4 – Lady Katherine Ferrers, English aristocrat and heiress (d. 1660)
- May 7 – Richard Legh, English politician (d. 1687)
- May 8 – Alexander Stuart, 5th Earl of Moray, Scottish nobleman (d. 1701)
- June 1 – Roeloff Swartwout, American city founder in New York (d. 1715)
- June 6 – Maria Elisabeth of Holstein-Gottorp, Landgravine of Hesse-Darmstadt (d. 1665)
- June 14 – Nathaniel Bond, English politician (d. 1707)
- June 20 – Charles Emmanuel II, Duke of Savoy (d. 1675)
- June 27 – Andreas Cleyer, German physician, pharmacist, botanist, and trader of the Dutch East India Company (d. 1698)

=== July–September ===
- July 3 – Countess Palatine Dorothea Catherine of Birkenfeld-Bischweiler, Countess of Nassau-Ottweiler (d. 1715)
- July 8 – Thomas Butler, 6th Earl of Ossory (d. 1680)
- July 12 – John George I, Duke of Saxe-Eisenach, German duke (d. 1686)
- July 14 – Pasquier Quesnel, French Jansenist theologian (d. 1719)
- July 18 – Johannes Camphuys, Governor-General of the Dutch East Indies (d. 1695)
- July 23 – Sir John Hoskyns, 2nd Baronet, English politician (d. 1705)
- August 12 – Adam Colonia, Dutch Golden Age painter (d. 1685)
- August 16 – Johann Daniel Major, German professor of theoretical medicine (d. 1693)
- August 24 – Mary Eastey, American witch (d. 1692)
- August 31 – Paul Amman, German physician, botanist (d. 1691)
- September 4 – Robert South, English churchman known for his combative preaching (d. 1716)
- September 6 – Thomas Tryon, British hat maker (d. 1703)
- September 7 – Sir Richard Bulkeley, 1st Baronet, Irish politician (d. 1685)
- September 22 – Christiana of Schleswig-Holstein-Sonderburg-Glücksburg, duchess consort of Saxe-Merseburg (1650–1691) (d. 1701)

=== October–December ===
- October 10 – Jan van Neck, Dutch painter (d. 1714)
- October 18 – Luca Giordano, Italian late Baroque painter and printmaker in etching (d. 1705)
- November 6 – Giuseppe Ghezzi, Italian painter (d. 1721)
- November 7 – Francis Winnington, Solicitor-General for England and Wales (d. 1700)
- November 23 – Paulet St John, 3rd Earl of Bolingbroke, English politician (d. 1711)
- November 25 – Richard Slater, English politician (d. 1699)
- November 27 – Roger Toothaker, victim of the Salem witch trials (d. 1692)
- November 28 – Marie Luise von Degenfeld, morganatic second wife of Charles I Louis, Elector Palatine of Germany (d. 1677)
- December 15 – Thomas Kingo, Danish bishop (d. 1703)
- December 24 – Mariana of Austria (d. 1696)
- December 31 – Hotta Masatoshi, Japanese rōjū to Shōgun Tokugawa Ietsuna (d. 1684)

== Deaths ==
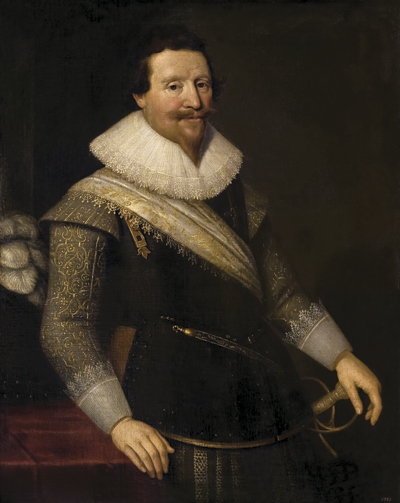
Albrecht von Wallenstein

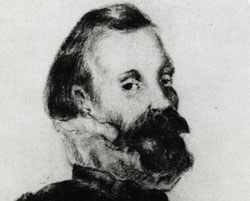
Hendrick Avercamp

- January 17 – Albert Szenczi Molnár, Hungarian translator (b. 1574)
- February 15 – Anna Maria of Ostfriesland, German noblewoman (b. 1601)
- February 25 – Albrecht von Wallenstein, Bohemian general (assassinated) (b. 1583)
- March 23 – Elizabeth Finch, 1st Countess of Winchilsea, English countess (b. 1556)
- April 2 – Maria Celeste, Italian nun, daughter of Galileo Galilei (b. 1600)
- April 8 – Giovanni Srofenaur, Italian musician (b. 1580)
- May 12 – George Chapman, English author (b. c.1559)
- May 15 (bur.) – Hendrick Avercamp, Dutch painter (b. 1585)
- June 22 – Johann von Aldringen, Austrian field marshal (b. 1588)
- June 25 – John Marston, English dramatist (b. 1576)
- July 25 – Francesco de' Medici, Tuscan prince (b. 1614)
- August 9 – William Noy, English jurist (b. 1577)
- August 11 – Frederick Ulrich, Duke of Brunswick-Lüneburg (b. 1591)
- August 18 – Urbain Grandier, French priest (b. 1590)
- September 3 – Edward Coke, English colonial entrepreneur and jurist (b. 1552)
- September 6 – Frederick III, Margrave of Brandenburg-Ansbach (b. 1616)
- September 26 – Dorothea of Anhalt-Zerbst, Duchess of Brunswick-Wolfenbüttel (b. 1607)
- October 6 – Otto Louis of Salm-Kyrburg-Mörchingen, Swedish general in the Thirty Years' War (b. 1597)
- October 8 – Francis Julius of Saxe-Lauenburg, Prince (b. 1584)
- October 19 – Agnes of Jesus, French Catholic nun (b. 1602)
- November 11 - Saint Marina of Omura, Japanese Dominican tertiary and one of the 16 Martyrs of Japan
- November 14 – Sophia of Holstein-Gottorp, Regent of Mecklenburg-Schwerin (1603–1608) (b. 1569)
- November 19 – Alexander Charles Vasa, 5th son of King Sigismund III Vasa (b. 1614)
- November 20 – Anna Maria of Solms-Sonnewalde, Countess consort of Hohenlohe-Langenburg (b. 1585)
- December 7 - Đào Duy Từ, Vietnamese scholar, poet, military adviser, and mandarin under Nguyễn lord Nguyễn Phúc Nguyên
- December 11 – Fadrique de Toledo, 1st Marquis of Villanueva de Valdueza, Spanish noble and admiral (b. 1580)
- December 25
  - Count Walter Butler, Irish immigrant living in Germany (b. 1600s)
  - Lettice Knollys, English noblewoman (b. 1543)
- December 29 – John Albert Vasa, Polish bishop (b. 1612)
- date unknown
  - Adriano Banchieri, Italian composer (b. 1568)
  - Johan Bara, Dutch painter, engraver (b. c. 1581)
