= Taking of Diest (1580) =

Action in the Dutch Revolt

Coordinates: 50°59′N 5°3′E

- Part of the Eighty Years' War
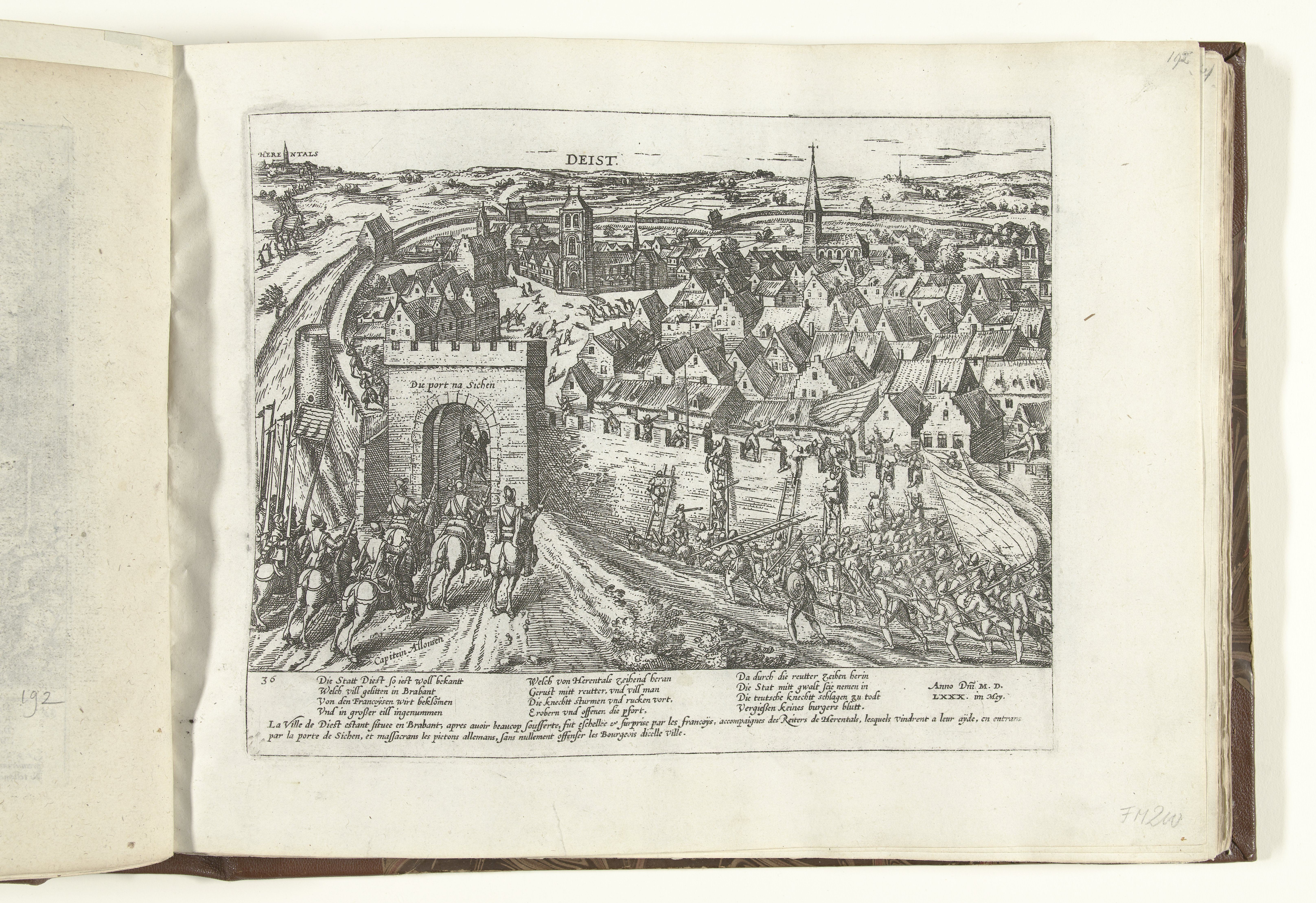
- An engraving of the taking of Diest by Frans Hogenberg, 1580–1582
Date	9 June 1580
Location	Diest, Duchy of Brabant (present-day Belgium)
Result	States-General victory

Belligerents
(Dutch Republic) States-General	Spain

Commanders and leaders
(Dutch Republic) Alonso Vanegas	(Spain) Count of Lodron

The Taking of Diest (9 June 1580) was a successful surprise assault on the town of Diest, in the Duchy of Brabant, during the Dutch Revolt.

== Background ==
The lordship of Diest, one of the smaller towns in the Duchy of Brabant, was part of the patrimony of the House of Nassau. In 1578 the town's magistrates were called upon to accept a rebel garrison, and had instead petitioned the king's governor general, Don John of Austria, to provide a royal garrison. The town, strategically located at the crossroads of the roads from Maastricht to Antwerp and from Brussels to Roermond, was accordingly garrisoned by Walloon and German soldiers serving in the Army of Flanders.

== Taking of the town ==
Just before dawn on 9 June 1580, a small force of French infantry soldiers serving the States-General, commanded by the Spaniard Alonso Vanegas, scaled the walls and killed the sentries. They then opened the Zichem gate to a detachment of Dutch cavalry troopers from the garrisons of Mechelen and Herentals.

The two Walloon companies of the garrison fled, but the three companies of Germans took defensive positions on the town square and fought to the last man. In the words of one chronicler:

The three companies of Germans that were there, of the regiment of the Count of Lodron, all experienced soldiers, fought valiantly against those of the States, and with such ferocity and courage, that it was a wonder to see, by the great constancy that they showed, such that one fell dead atop another, without abandoning one another, to the last drop of blood in their bodies, so that the victory of the States was a dear one.

== Aftermath ==
As a result of the taking of Diest, the ungarrisoned nearby towns of Aarschot and Zichem also fell under the control of the States. William of Orange, hereditary lord of Diest, fined the town 60,000 guilders for having failed to take his side in the conflict.

In 1582 a force of royal soldiers successfully scaled the town walls in an attempt to retake Diest, but they were unable to open a gate for their supporting cavalry, and after fierce fighting the survivors were taken prisoner.
