= 1580 influenza pandemic =

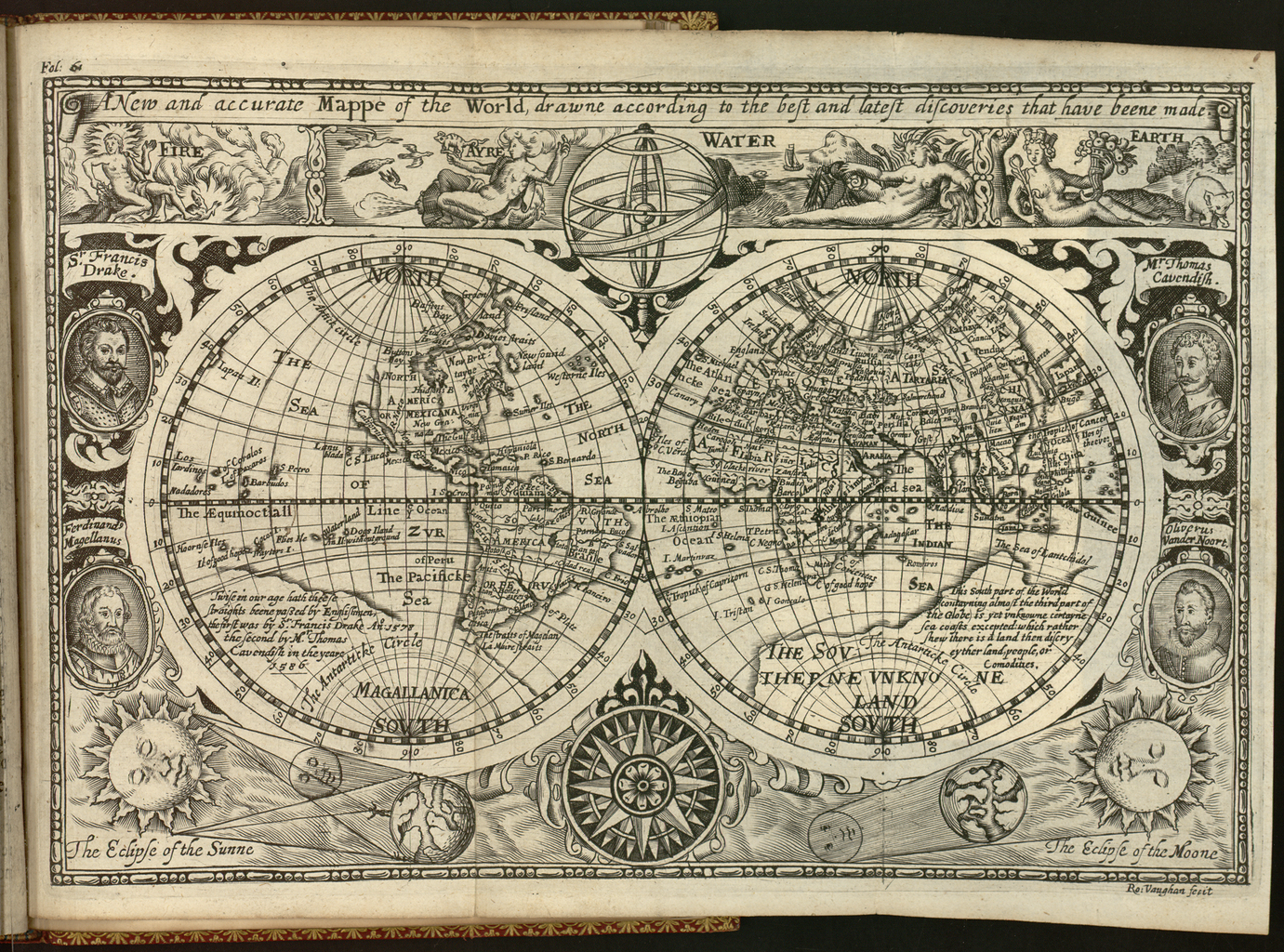
- The 1580 flu pandemic spread from Asia to Africa and Europe, then America.
- Disease: Influenza
- Location: Asia, Africa, and Europe
- Date: 1580-1582
- Deaths: Thousands in cities

In 1580 a severe influenza pandemic was recorded on several continents. The virus originated in Asia and spread along the Silk Road through the Middle East into Europe and Africa, where newly established maritime trade routes and moving armies facilitated its worldwide spread. Contemporary historian Johann Boekel wrote that it spread over all of Europe in six weeks, in which thousands died and nearly everyone was infected. Those who witnessed the epidemic variously called the disease nicknames like coqueluche, Shaufkrankeit, castrone, or variations of catarrh or fever. Physicians of the time increasingly appreciated that "epidemic catarrhs" were being directly caused by a contagious agent instead of the stars or environment.

The speed with which this disease propagated across societies and the symptoms strongly resembling influenza have been the basis for historians and academics to commonly identify this as a flu pandemic. Many contemporary epidemiologists consider this to be the first ever influenza pandemic.

== Asia ==
The epidemic has long been recognized as originating in Asia. The Italian historian Cesare Campana recorded in Delle Historie del Mundo (1599) that the "mal di Montone" quickly spread to the entirety of Africa and Europe. Infected travelers on the Silk Road brought the flu to the Levant, from whence it spread from the Ottoman Empire. The Spanish historian Antonio de Herrera y Tordesillas deduced that this epidemic most likely struck the Levant (then part of the Ottoman Empire) before hitting European cities in an east–west direction.

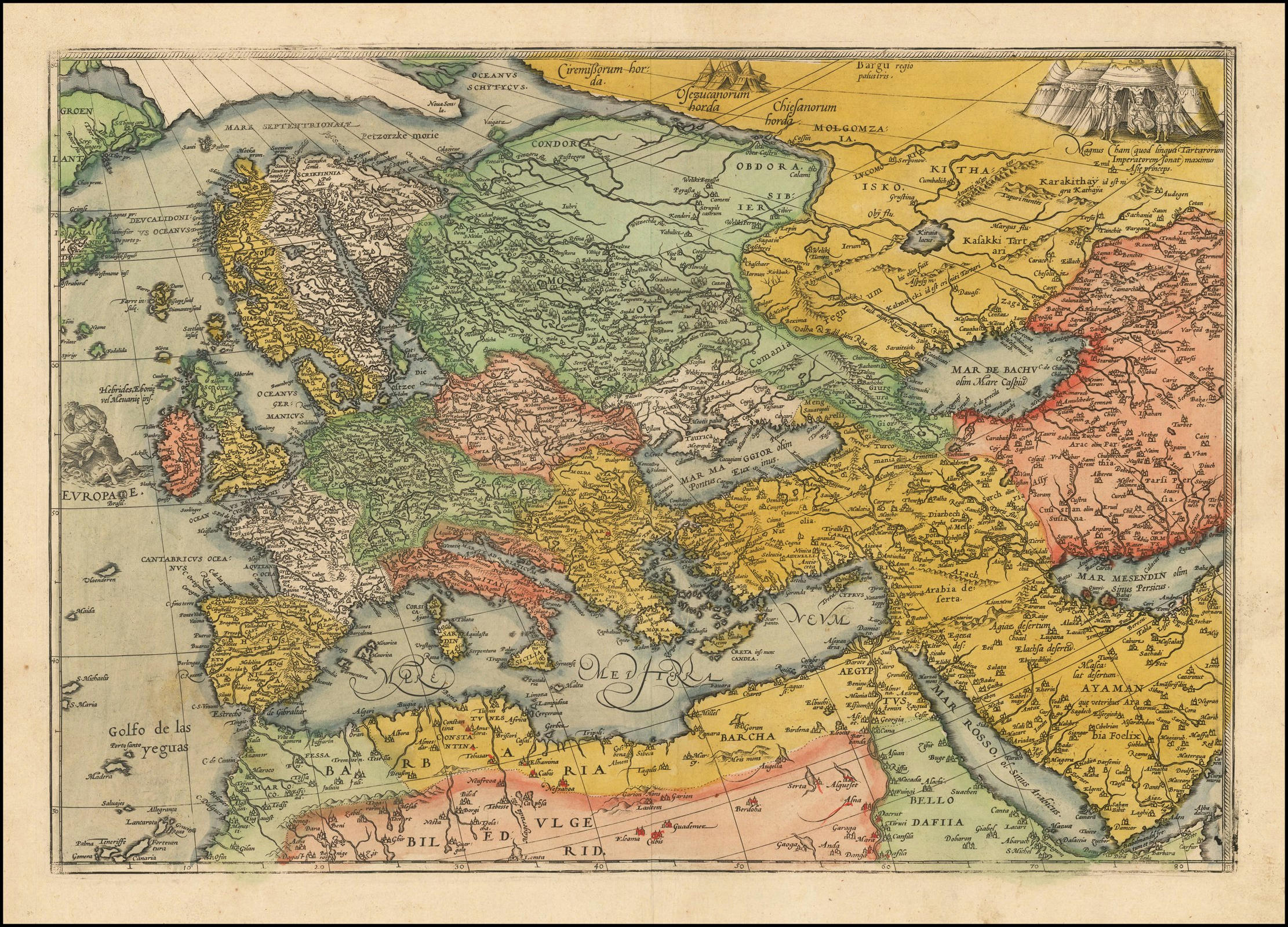
The Ottoman Empire held crucial ports in Europe, North Africa, and the Arabian Peninsula.

=== Ottoman Empire ===
Constantinople was being impacted by influenza in June. The Ottoman capital was a crucial Mediterranean port for shipping all varieties of goods, thus flu spread quickly to Ottoman territories in Europe, North Africa, and the Arabian Peninsula by ships. It immediately spread east to the ports of the Crimea, then north through Poland towards the Baltics. Influenza simultaneously spread though the empire's vast territory in southeastern Europe and infected the Republic of Venice by June.

=== India ===
Catalan priest Pere Gil, who observed the epidemic spread, mentions that after passing through Western Europe that the disease rebounded into India.

== Africa ==
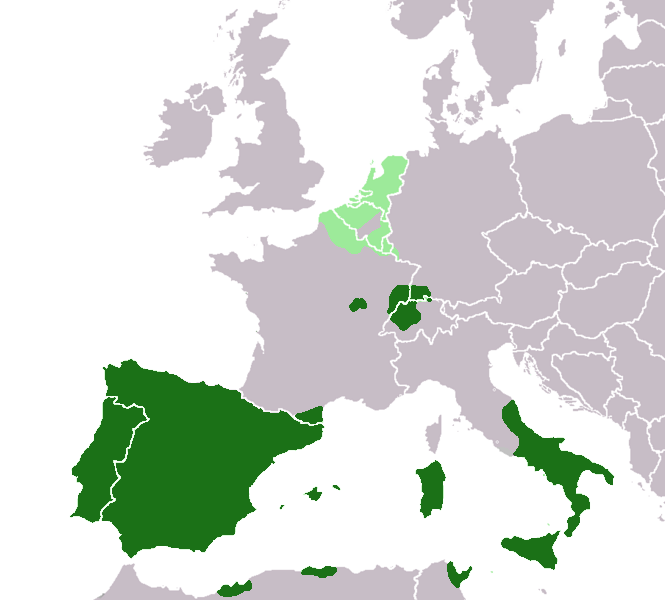
Spain's coastal territories facilitated the 1580 flu's spread around Europe.

Ottoman Algeria was a busy nexus for trade between North Africa and Europe. Flu traveled by infected merchants from the Ottoman to the Spanish Empires, which experienced outbreaks on the coast of North African in June. Spanish and Ottoman feuding had largely ended by 1580, enabling trade and travel between the two massive empires. Milanese physician Antonio Angelo Bellagatta believed that the 1580 flu caused widespread morbidity and mortality in Africa. Infected sailors had diffused influenza throughout the mediterranean to Spanish, Italian, and Maltese ports by late spring.

== Europe ==
Flu reached Europe in spring and quickly throughout the continent's interconnected Habsburg trade routes, where it triggered very large outbreaks that lasted from late June to mid October. In 1580, Europe was beset by wars that may have facilitated the spread of flu around Europe: Spain was dispatching soldiers to Portugal, Ireland, and the Netherlands, France was in a civil war, and Poland was preparing to invade Russia. Physicians called flu variations of febris, or fever, in their records such as morbus catarrhales, febris epidemica, or even febris pestilencia. The flu paralyzed armies and communities in outbreaks noted for their speed and universality, which in major cities lasted around 4 to 6 weeks and claimed thousands of lives. Influenza epidemics returned in waves until the fall of 1581.

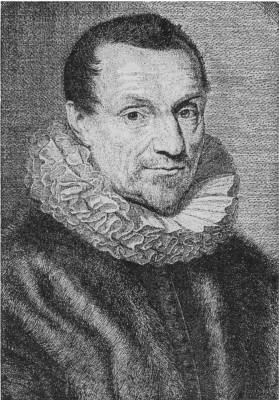
Jacques Auguste de Thou recorded valuable observations of the epidemic in Europe.

=== Spanish and Portuguese Empires ===
Portuguese chronicler Antonio de Herrera mentions that the disease struck Europe in Autumn. It spread "little by little" through Spain leaving citizens with severe headaches and coughing, runny noses, and long-lasting fevers. Sicily, then a vassal state of Spain, began seeing cases after possibly being introduced from Malta. Flu was being recorded in Catalonia at the beginning of August. André de Leones of Barcelona wrote that by September 7 all of his neighbors had experienced sickness. An estimated 20,000 of the city's residents had similarly falling ill in under two weeks during the height of the epidemic, with high numbers of casualties. Other Spanish cities were reportedly "depopulated" during the 1580 pandemic, which demonstrated an unusually high lethality for influenza. It was generally referred to in Spain as el catarro.

Spanish royalty, nobility and clergy were significantly impacted. The Countess Doña Isabel de Castro died of the flu in Valladolid in August, followed by the Archbishop of Seville in September. King Philip II had given an order to send 40-50 Augustine and Franciscan priests to serve as ambassadors to newly discovered islands in the Philippines, but was only able to dispatch 34 due to the epidemic. According to the chronicler Jacques Auguste de Thou, the king himself became very ill and was attended to by his wife Anna of Austria, Queen of Spain. Anna contracted the flu during her pregnancy and it was seen as a contributing factor to her death on October 17.

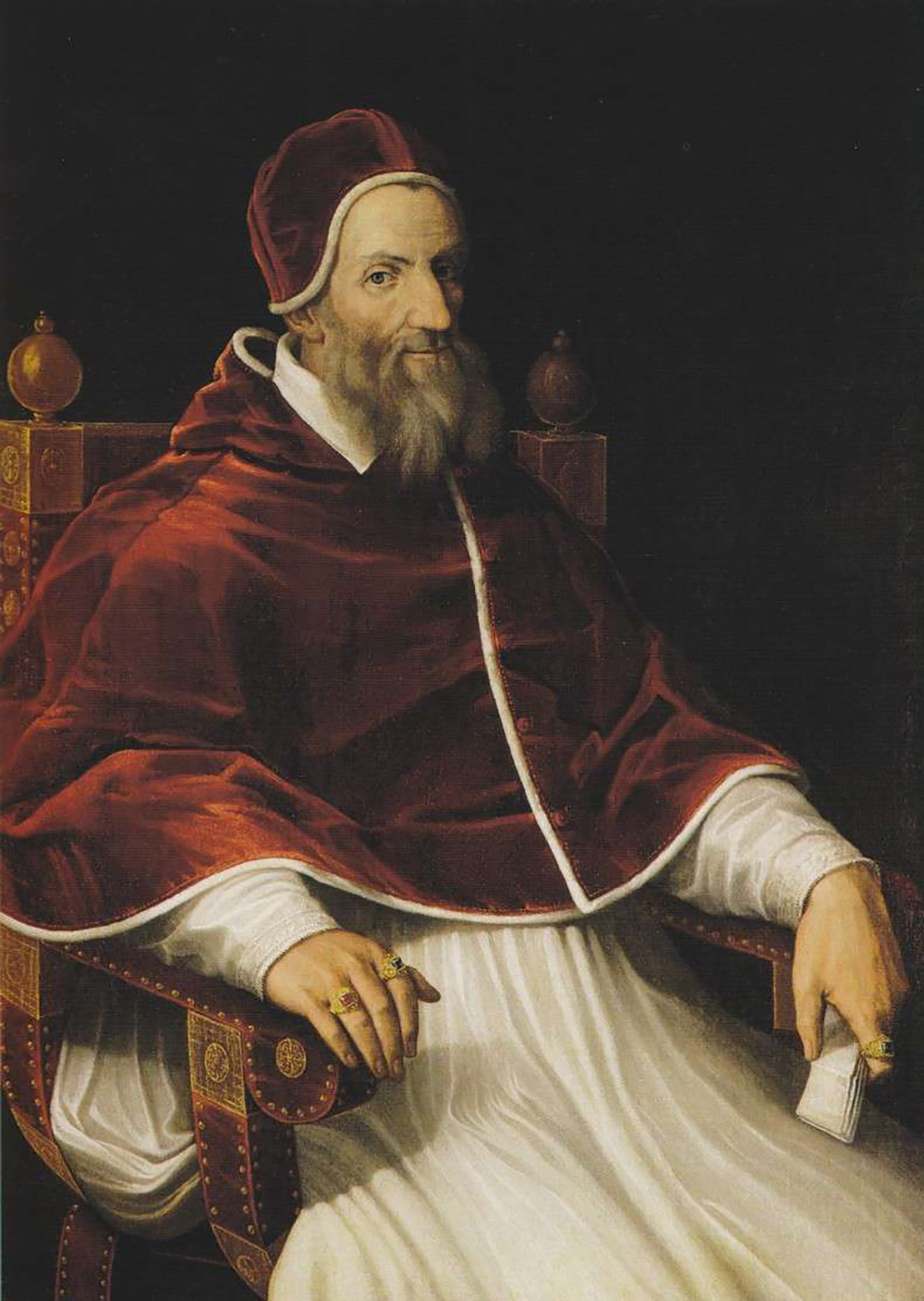
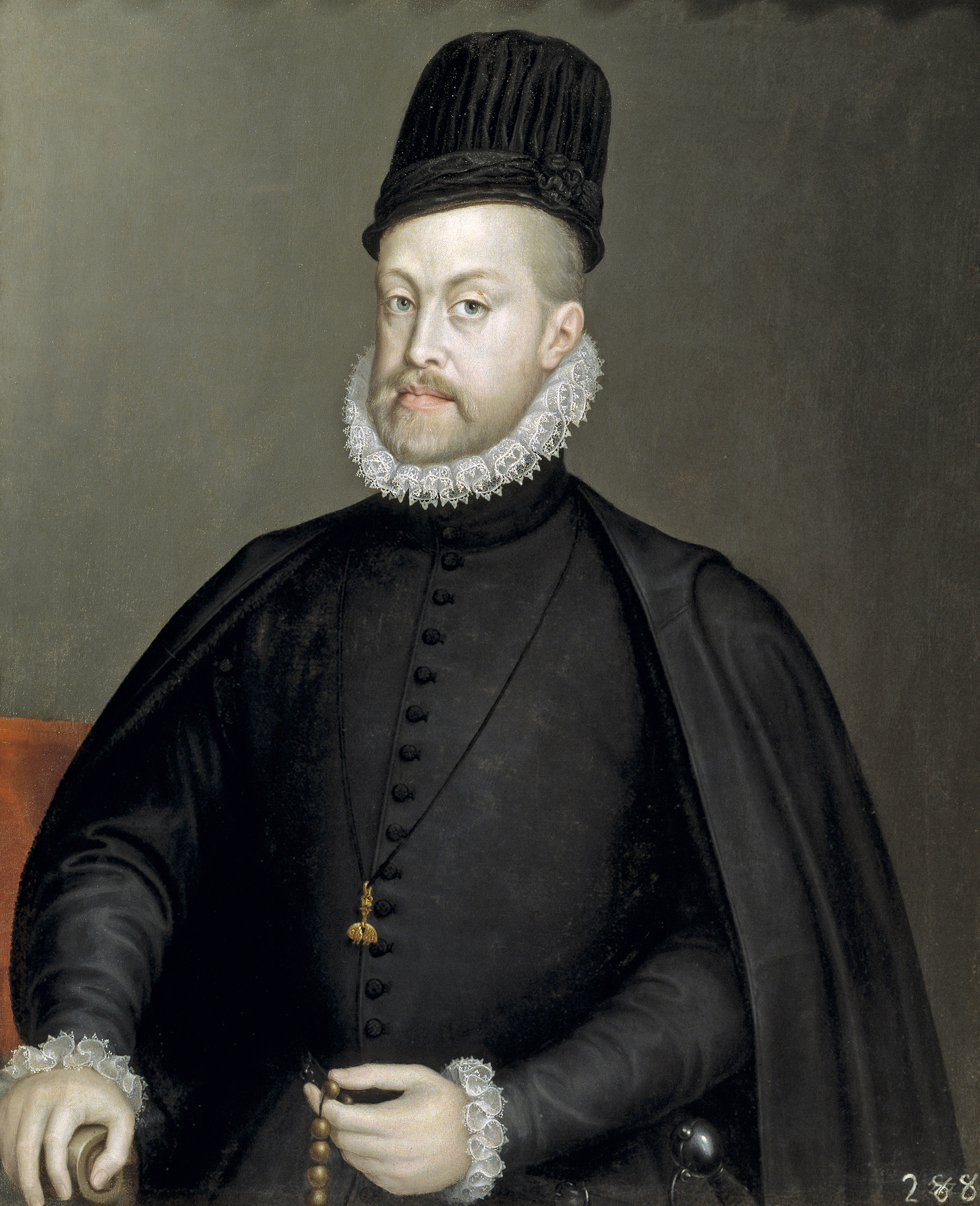
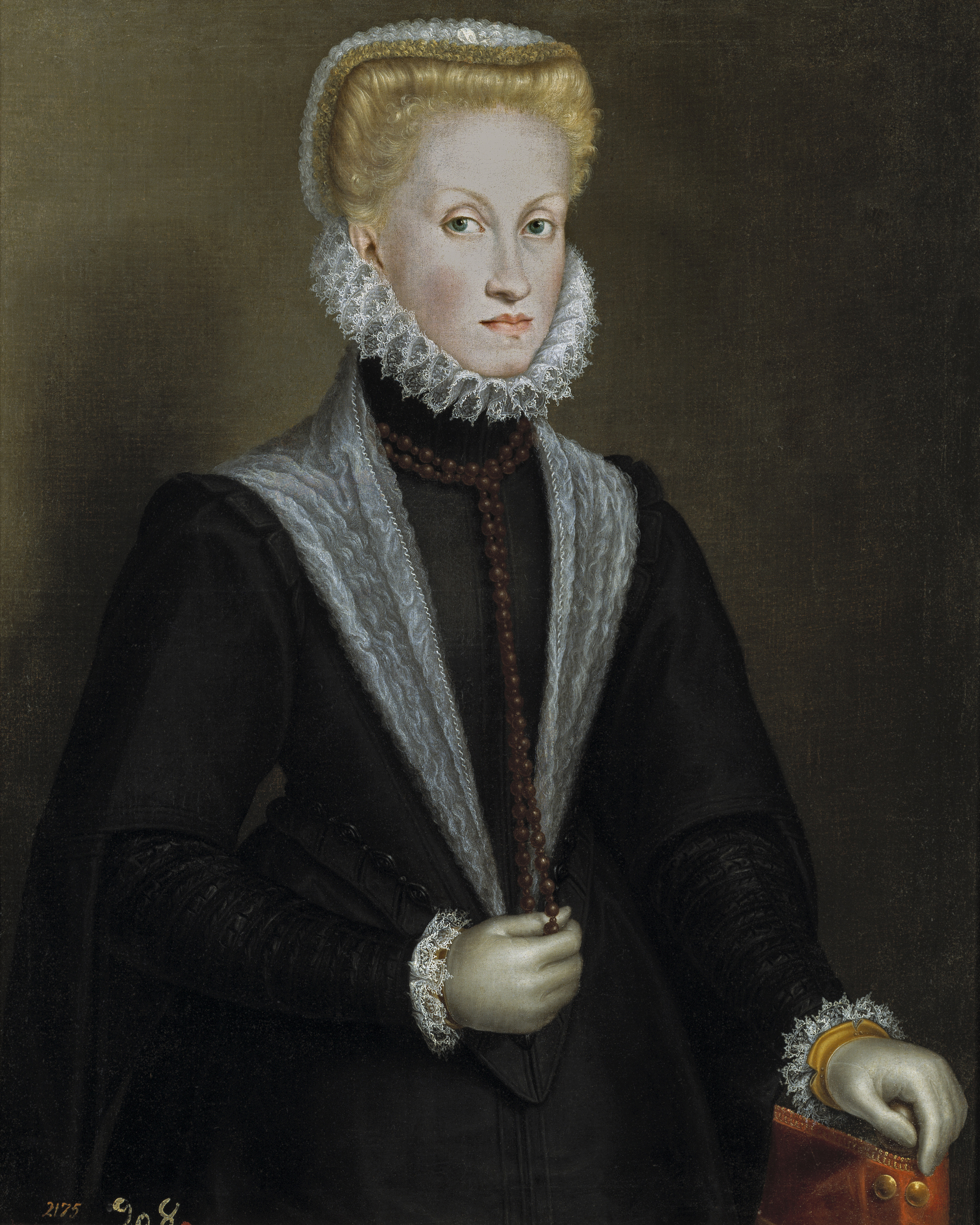
Pope Gregory XIII and the Spanish King and Queen were all stricken by "catarro."

Influenza spread into the Spanish Netherlands quickly and early with cases recorded in Delft during June and July, likely brought by Spanish reinforcements sent to fight Dutch rebels. Ships from heavily affected Spain would have docked at the crowded port of Antwerp, from which flu likely spread to England. Cases continued to be reported in Spanish Netherlands well into October. Unlike in Rome and Madrid, the flu was not particularly fatal in the Netherlands.

Portugal saw the arrival of influenza during the War of the Portuguese Succession. The Spanish-allied Duke of Alba wrote in letters that he "had it very mean with the catarrh" in Lisbon on September 2. As Philip II fought the flu, Antonio of Portugal organized 9000 soldiers in Coimbra and successfully suppressed support for the Duke of Alba.

=== Italian Kingdoms ===
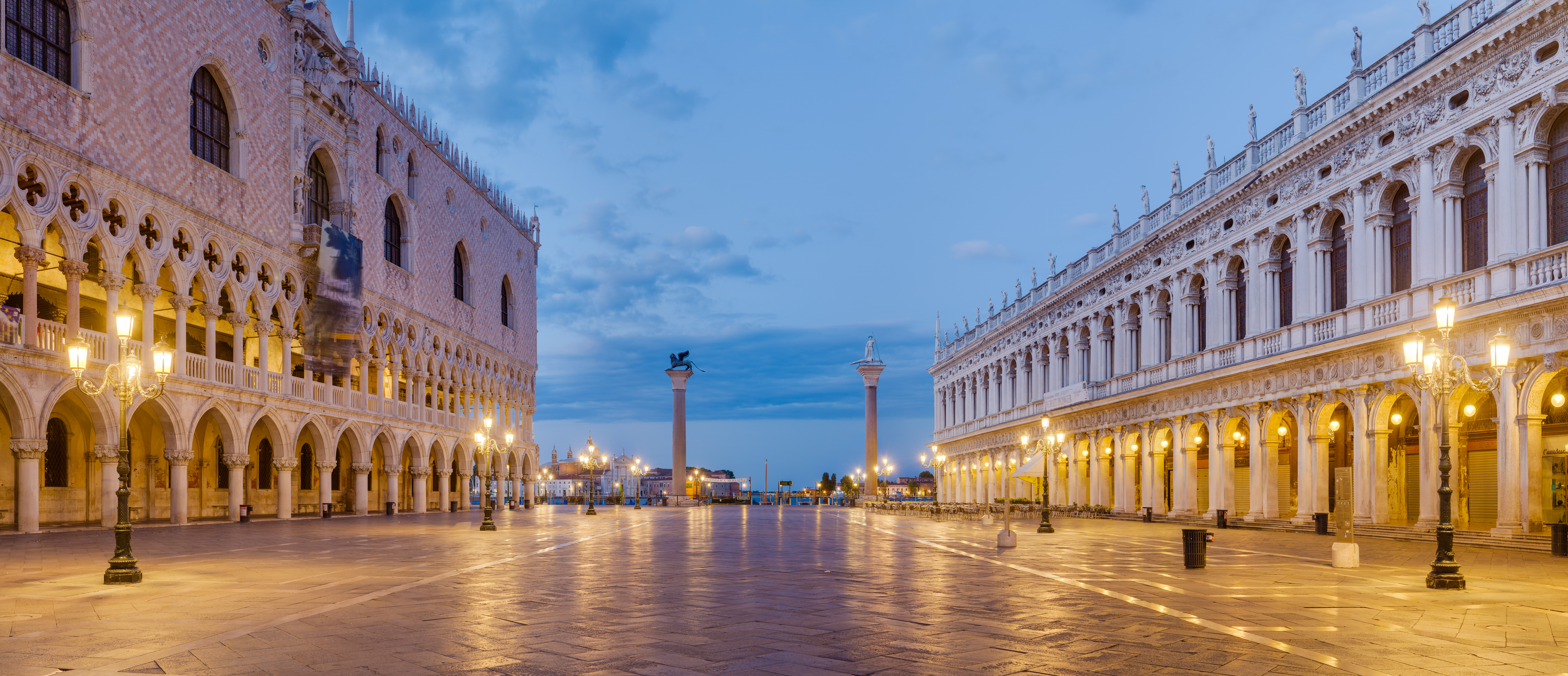
Influenza arrived in Venice from the Ottoman Empire.

Campana recorded that the disease spread through Italy with the greatest intensity between August and September, and ascribed its cause to the damp and rainy spring prior. The Italian Kingdoms shared heavy trade with Habsburg Spain and the Republic of Venice shared a land border with the Ottoman Empire, entry points through which the flu invaded Italy early. Venice first recorded a flu epidemic on June 27 when writer Frederico Bujatto documented in Civil Acts a disease nicknamed moltone or montone, named for March's constellation Aries, spread throughout the city and featured a fever, cough, and headache for around 3 days. Influenza quickly spread through the communes of the Friuli region, such as Udine where an outbreak was recorded by the physician Gaspare Pratense. In Florence an outbreak of "male de Castrone" peaked during the first week of July. Rome's epidemic peaked in July, and its death toll was believed by some contemporaries to be as high as 10,000 (dubious as the city only had a population of around 100,000 at the time).

By late July, the large numbers of people falling ill in Rome caught the attention of Pope Gregory XIII, who prohibited price-increases of goods during the epidemic, and Superior General Everard Mercurian of the Society of Jesus. Both ministered and cared for Rome's sick during the epidemic, causing them to contract the flu. Mercurian fell ill in late July and died on August 1, and the Pope was "on the edge of death" according to de Thou. On August 2 Lucrezia Gori, daughter of the popular composer Giovanni Palestrina, died suddenly amid Rome's epidemic. Nearly the entire city was infected (cite source) over the summer and out of a population of 80,000. 2000-9000 ultimately died of the flu within three months. Ineffective treatments such as bleeding and the exposure rates for clergy members, who continued to minister while sick, likely contributed to the city's high death toll.

=== England, Wales, Scotland, and Ireland ===
Weekly mortalities increased in London as a result of flu during a period known as the "gentle correction." View source data.

From the trading ports of Antwerp influenza reached England in early summer. It arrived in London, then a city of around 120,000 people in 1580, in early June and became widespread by July.

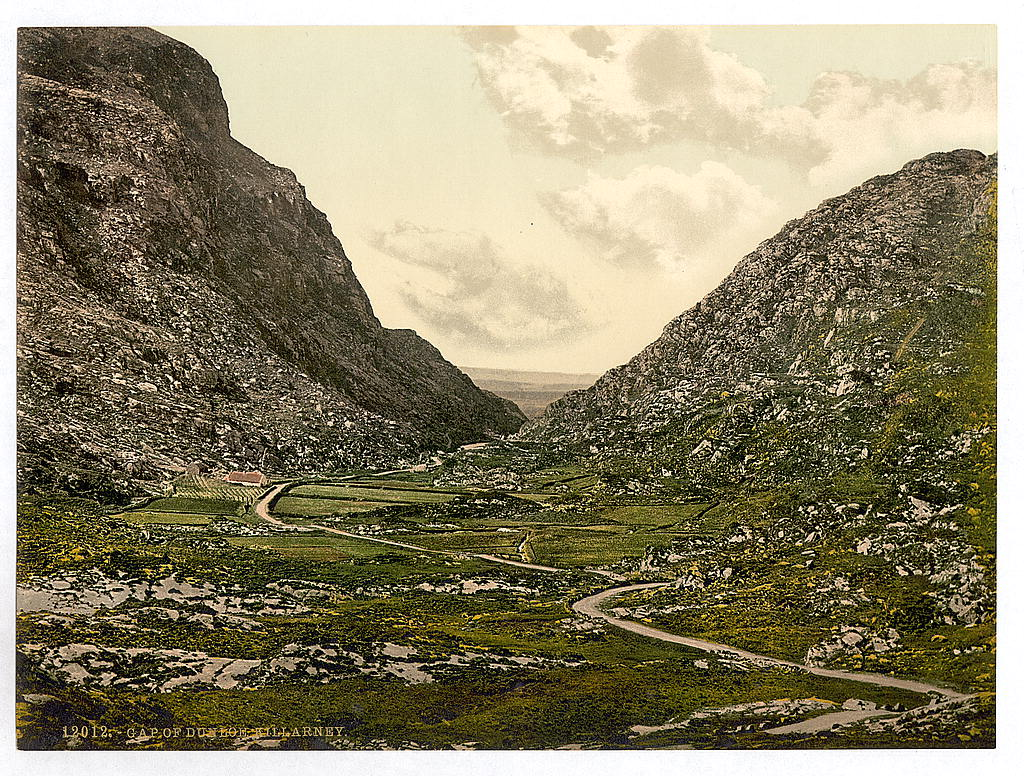
Influenza was in Kerry when English troops marched in August.

London experienced significant excess mortalities during the flu epidemic, a period referred to as the "gentle correction" [by who or what] which lasted from late June to mid-August 1580. Reported overall weekly mortalities for London rose from 47 on June 30 to 77 on July 7 before rising to 133, 146, 96, and 78 deaths for the next four weeks respectively. According to a 1920s translation of the French Ambassador Michel de Castelnau's letters, Queen Elizabeth fell ill with "whooping cough accompanied by a high fever" on July 5 as the flu was spreading throughout London. The modern French word for whooping cough, “Coqueluche”, meant influenza in 1580. British physician Thomas Short wrote that "few died except those that were let blood of or had unsound viscera," indicating that the epidemic's outcome was not as severe in England as in Italy or Spain.

Influenza was also spreading in Ireland. During the Desmond Rebellions an English force was seized by flu in August when over 300 soldiers fell ill in County Kerry while advancing to seize Tralee and Dingle. All survived.

=== France ===
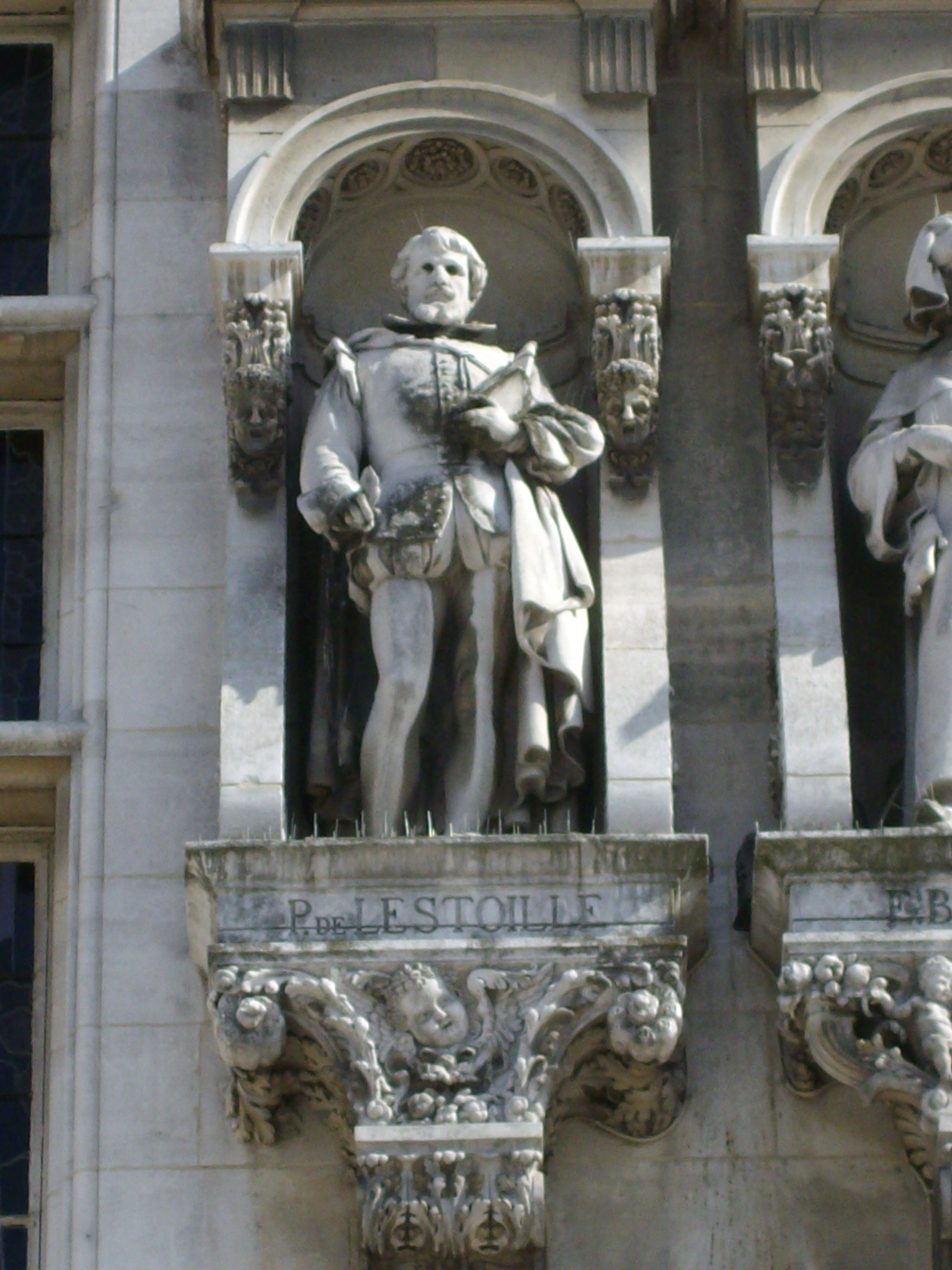
Pierre de L'Estoile recorded the flu epidemic in Paris.

Amid civil war, influenza spread into the Kingdom of France during spring. Montpellier professor Lazare Rivière (1589–1655) believed the epidemic first arrived in the southern Languedoc region just after a locust plague in April and May. French physicians referred to flu as variations of febris or catharre but it was still casually referred to as coqueluche. Rivière described the "febris epidemica" of 1580 as featuring fever, coughing, headaches and back pain. Rivière observed that the disease spread rapidly and often resulted in death if the patient didn't recover within 5 days.

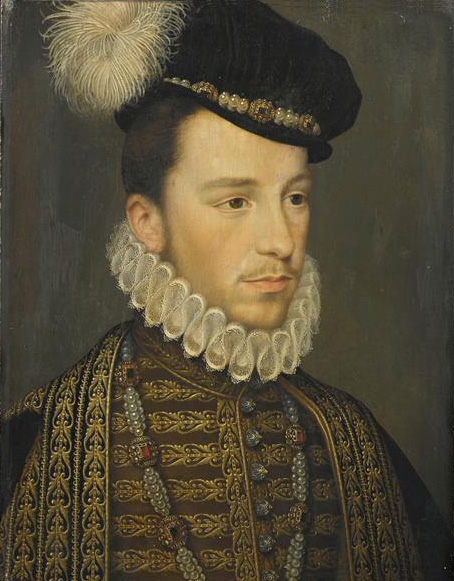
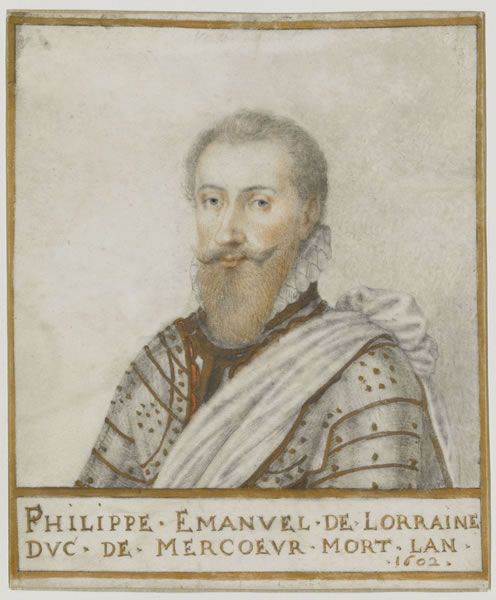
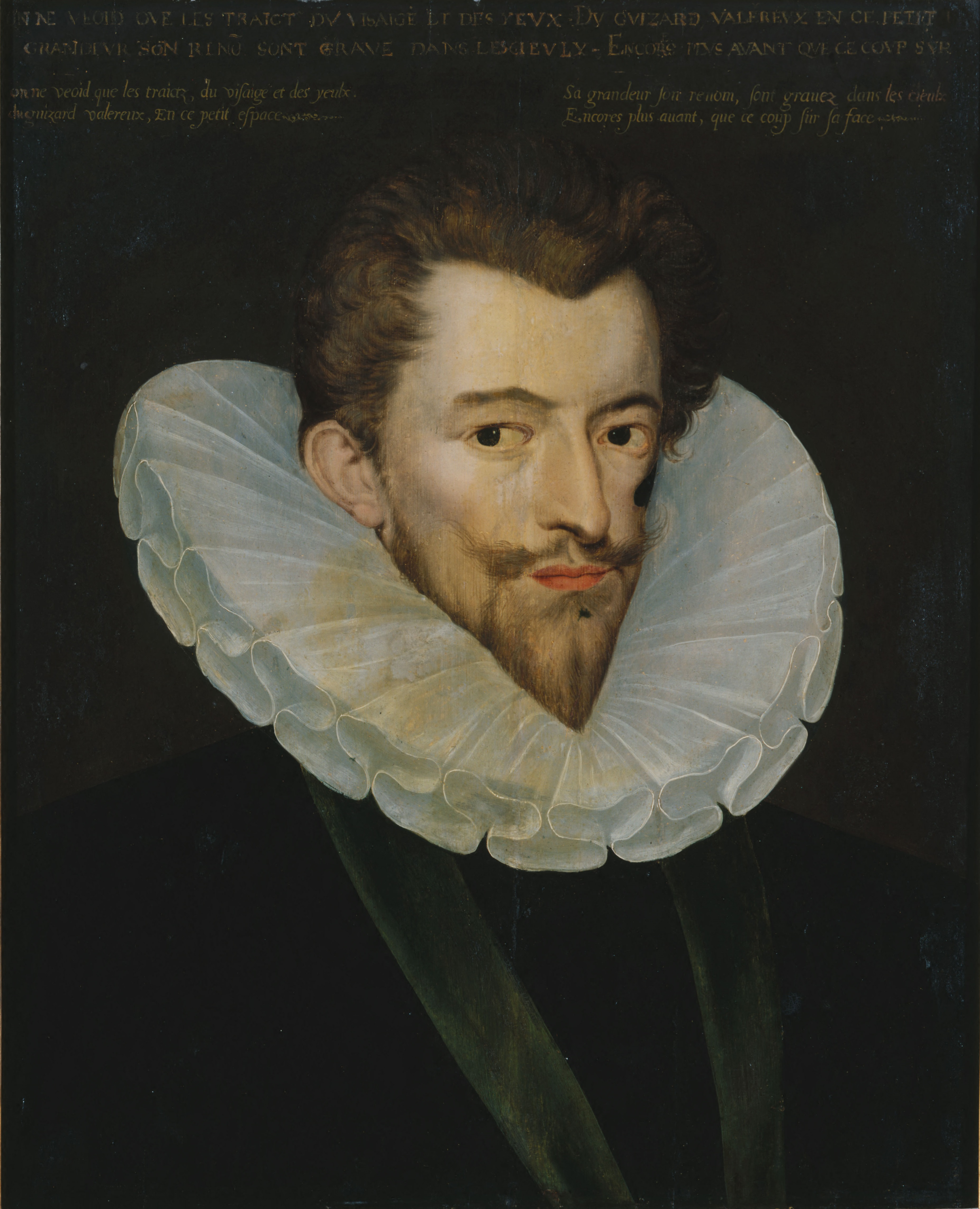
The King of France and Duke of Guise and Duke of Mercœur were sickened during the outbreak.

From the coasts the virus spread instantly to Paris, even then a highly connected city with all varieties of travelers. Nicole Gilles recorded the "peste" of "coqueluche" in the city, which remained widespread into July. According to Pierre de L'Estoile, 10,000 Parisians fell ill from June 2 to June 8 alone including King Henry III, the Duke of Mercœur, and the Duke of Guise. At the direction of a sick Mercœur, Roch Le Baillif wrote and published Traicté du remede à la peste. The epidemic caused significant alarm in Paris, and rumors spread throughout the city of over 10,000 dying in Rome from "Coqueluche" in less than three months. Central France saw outbreaks documented in Poitiers and Orléans during July.

Flu spread through France's south at the same time as the North, and likely through armies during the French Wars of Religion. Frederico Despalau and de Thou describe outbreaks of disease, possibly influenza, sickening both the royal army of King Henry III and the Duke of Biron's opposing forces in early August, with military campaigns ending shortly thereafter in favor of the French King.

=== Holy Roman Empire ===
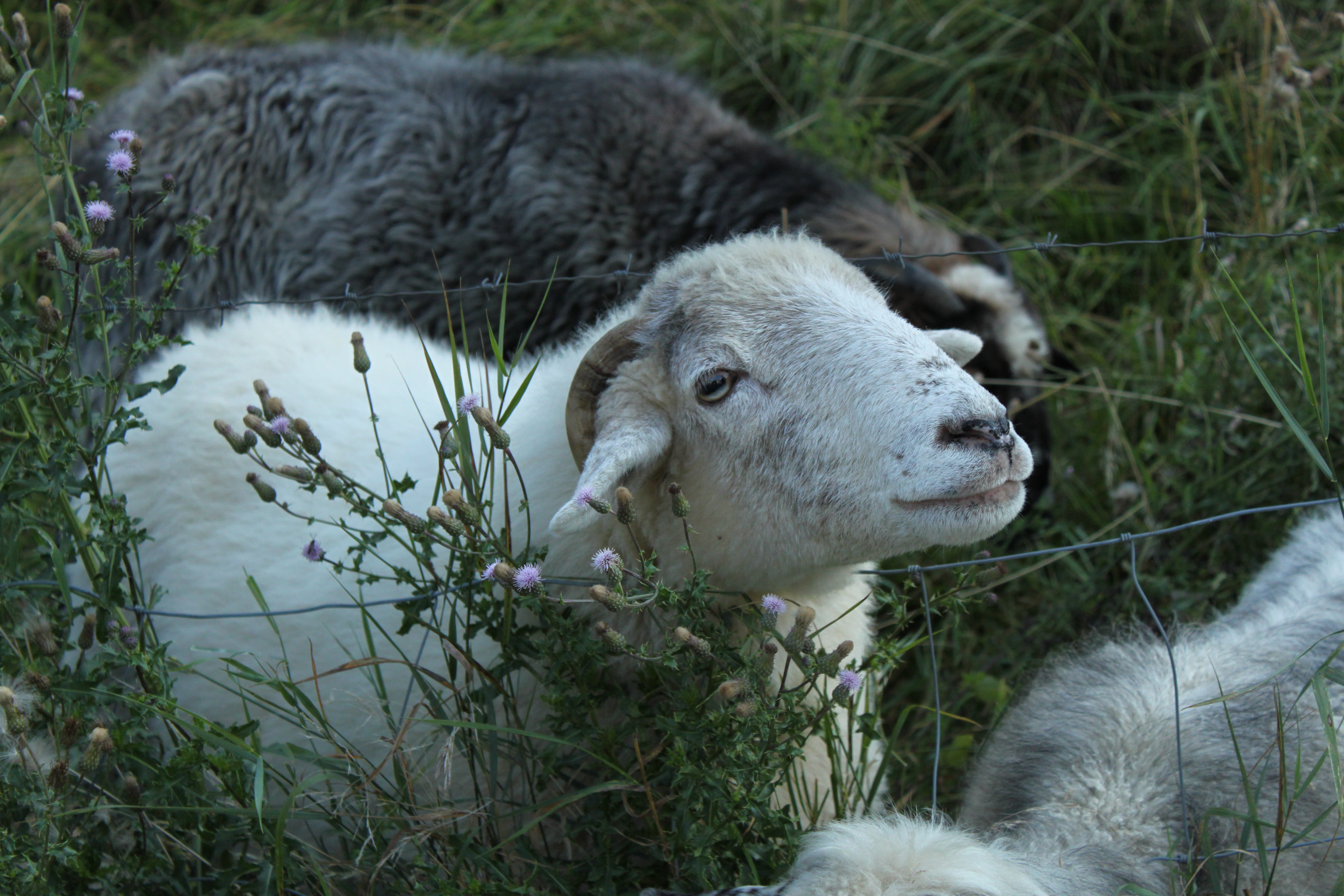
Flu received names on mainland Europe after sicknesses of livestock, particularly sheep.

Flu arrived in the Holy Roman Empire in summer after crossing from Italy, and had diffused throughout the country by fall. The epidemic's observers compared the symptoms and spread to epidemics of livestock, particularly sheep, and nicknamed flu 'chirp' (Zeip), 'sheep's cough' (Shaufthusten), and 'sheep's illness' (Shauftkrankeit). It appeared in Geneva at the beginning of June, the same time as Paris, and sickened many. German chronicler Johann Sporisch wrote in 1582 that the disease had "affected not only private houses, but also cities and entire kingdoms with such invasive ferocity," and described high fevers, fatigue, severe pain, pneumonia, and near-universal infection with the disease. Johan Boekle observed that the flu seemed to "spread over all of Europe in six weeks," although it most likely took around four months.

Germany's larger cities were significantly impacted. Johan Boekle wrote that "In some places the sick fell into sweats, flowing more copiously in some than in others, so that a suspicion arose in the minds of some physicians of that English sweat which laid waste to the human race so horribly in 1529..." In Lübeck and Hamburg, thousands died. In September an outbreak was recorded at Schleswig-Holstein.

=== Polish–Lithuanian Commonwealth, Scandinavia and Russia ===
Influenza spread from the Ottoman Empire through Poland from July to October, and was spreading in the Baltics within 4 months. At the time, the Polish–Lithuanian Commonwealth was engaged in the Livonian War against Russia. The Polish king dispatched a force of 48,000 men into Russia during the Battle of Velikiye Luki from September 1 to 5, whilst the flu was spreading in Poland.

From Schleswig the epidemic spread quickly towards Denmark–Norway and Sweden, eventually spreading to even Iceland. Antonio Possevino, a papal diplomat on assignment in Sweden, wrote on the 25 June 1580 that some children playing around Stegeborg Castle fell sick with an epidemic illness, possibly flu. A new college outside Stockholm had to temporarily shut down due partly to the spreading epidemic.

== North and South America ==
After spreading in Europe for six weeks the virus eventually crossed the Atlantic Ocean aboard infected sailors to the New World. Records of the epidemic in the New World remain scant, however, as observers in New Spain may have been distracted by a very severe series of cocoliztli epidemics that wiped out half of Mexico's population between 1576 and 1580. Antonio de Herrera mentions that the epidemic spread through the Indies in his series on Portugal's history, but doesn't go into detail.

== Medicine and Treatments ==
It was increasingly appreciated by European physicians of the time that rapidly-spreading epidemic catarrhs were not being caused by stars or temperatures, but some form of contagion.

Bloodletting and purgation were recognized as unhelpful and dangerous by various contemporaries. Dutch physician Johann Weyer observed that "venesection" very frequently resulted in death, but that even though almost everyone was infected the disease only killed around one in a thousand. Thus, most treatments involved providing the body with medicine instead of attempting to remove humors (bodily fluids).
