= 1639 in Spain =

- Decades: 1610s; 1620s; 1630s; 1640s; 1650s
- See also: History of Spain; Timeline of Spanish history; List of years in Spain

Events from the year 1639 in Spain.

== Incumbents ==
- Monarch: Philip IV

== Births ==
- February 12 - Juan García de Salazar, composer (d. 1710)
