= Giovanni Srofenaur =

- Born: February 28, 1580; Mantua
- Died: April 8, 1634 (aged 54); Mantua
- Genres: Baroque
- Occupation: Trumpeter
- Instrument: Trumpet
- Years active: 1596–1631

Giovanni Srofenaur (28 February 1580 – 8 April 1634) was an Italian trumpeter; he served as court trumpeter for the Duke of Mantua during the time of the House of Gonzaga. He served as the lead trumpeter from 1606 to 1631, under Ferdinando I Gonzaga, Vincenzo II Gonzaga, and Charles I, Duke of Mantua and Montferrat. Srofenaur led the trumpet fanfare trio during the 1607 premier performance of Claudio Monteverdi's L'Orfeo. Srofenaur was born and died in Mantua.

== See also ==
- List of trumpeters
