= 1586 =

1586 in various calendars
- Gregorian calendar: 1586; MDLXXXVI
- Ab urbe condita: 2339
- Armenian calendar: 1035; ԹՎ ՌԼԵ
- Assyrian calendar: 6336
- Balinese saka calendar: 1507–1508
- Bengali calendar: 992–993
- Berber calendar: 2536
- English Regnal year: 28 Eliz. 1 – 29 Eliz. 1
- Buddhist calendar: 2130
- Burmese calendar: 948
- Byzantine calendar: 7094–7095
- Chinese calendar: 乙酉年 (Wood Rooster); 4283 or 4076 — to — 丙戌年 (Fire Dog); 4284 or 4077
- Coptic calendar: 1302–1303
- Discordian calendar: 2752
- Ethiopian calendar: 1578–1579
- Hebrew calendar: 5346–5347
- Hindu calendars
- Vikram Samvat: 1642–1643
- Shaka Samvat: 1507–1508
- Kali Yuga: 4686–4687
- Holocene calendar: 11586
- Igbo calendar: 586–587
- Iranian calendar: 964–965
- Islamic calendar: 994–995
- Japanese calendar: Tenshō 14 (天正１４年)
- Javanese calendar: 1505–1506
- Julian calendar: Gregorian minus 10 days
- Korean calendar: 3919
- Minguo calendar: 326 before ROC 民前326年
- Nanakshahi calendar: 118
- Thai solar calendar: 2128–2129
- Tibetan calendar: ཤིང་མོ་བྱ་ལོ་ (female Wood-Bird); 1712 or 1331 or 559 — to — མེ་ཕོ་ཁྱི་ལོ་ (male Fire-Dog); 1713 or 1332 or 560

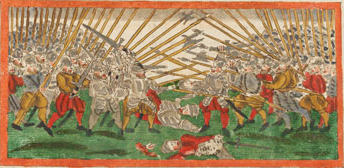
September 22: Battle of Zutphen

1586 (MDLXXXVI) was a common year starting on Wednesday of the Gregorian calendar and a common year starting on Saturday of the Julian calendar, the 1586th year of the Common Era (CE) and Anno Domini (AD) designations, the 586th year of the 2nd millennium, the 86th year of the 16th century, and the 7th year of the 1580s decade. As of the start of 1586, the Gregorian calendar was 10 days ahead of the Julian calendar, which remained in localized use until 1923.

== January – March ==
- January 3 – Augustus of Wettin, the Elector of Saxony, marries Agnes Hedwig of Anhalt, the 12-year-old daughter of Joachim Ernest, Prince of Anhalt. Augustus dies less than six weeks later.
- January 18 – The 7.9 magnitude Tenshō earthquake strikes the Chubu region of Japan, triggering a tsunami and causing at least 8,000 deaths.
- February 11
  - After a two-day battle, an English assault force led by Francis Drake captures the South American port of Cartagena de Indias, part of Spain's colony, the Viceroyalty of Peru (modern-day Cartagena in Colombia).
  - In Dresden, Christian I becomes the new Elector of Saxony, after the death of his father Augustus.
- February 14 – In India, Yakub Shah Chak becomes the new Sultan of Kashmir after the death of his father, the Sultan Yousuf Shah.
- February 16 – In what becomes Buner District, Pakistan, Kalu Khan leads his Yousafzai-Afghan Lashkar to defeat the Mughal Army at the Karakar Pass in the Afghan-Mughal War, annihilating them by the tens of thousands and inflicting one of the greatest defeats in Mughal history to Emperor of India Akbar the Great known as Battle of the Malandari Pass.
- February 23 – The Scottish crown jewels, recovered for King James VI by William Stewart of Caverston, are formally returned to the royal treasurer, Lord Melville. The jewels include a square gold pendant, inlaid with a large diamond and a ruby and several other diamonds, the "Great H of Scotland".
- March 3 – Battle of Werl in the Duchy of Westphalia (Germany): Claude de Berlaymont and a large force of 4,000 troops attempt to capture Maarten Schenck van Nydeggen, who had plundered the territory of Vest Recklinghausen within the Electorate of Cologne. Schenk and his men are able to escape after five days.
- March 12 – Greek-born Spanish artist Domḗnikos Theotokópoulos, known better as El Greco, is commissioned to paint his most famous work, The Burial of the Count of Orgaz, which he finishes in early 1588.
- March 18 – The Black Assize of Exeter begins in England as infected prisoners from the cells in Exeter's Rougemont Castle go on trial and an epidemic of typhus spreads quickly through the courtroom. The disease is quickly transmitted from body lice on inmates who had been incarcerated in unsanitary conditions. In addition to prisoners who died from the disease, typhus claims the life of eight judges and 11 of the 12 jurors. Author Alexander Jenkins writes later, "A noisome and pestilential smell came from the prisoners who were arraigned at the crown bar which so affected the people present that many were seized with a violent sickness which proved mortal to the greatest part of them."
- March 25 – Forty Martyrs of England and Wales: The most infamous case in England of a torture and execution by Peine forte et dure — slowly piling heavy stones upon a prisoner until they make a plea or die — is carried out against Margaret Clitherow of York after she refuses to enter a plea on charges of harboring Roman Catholic priests. She will be canonized as a Catholic saint in 1970 by Pope Paul VI.

== April – June ==
- April 12 – Francis Drake and the English conquerors depart Cartagena after having looted the city and being paid a ransom of 250,000 Spanish pesos by the New Granadan Governor, Don Pedro Fernández.
- May 27 – English privateers, commanded by Sir Francis Drake, carry out a raid on the Spanish settlement of St. Augustine, Florida.
- June 7 – Anglo-Spanish War: The Siege of Grave in the Netherlands, by Spanish General Peter Ernst I von Mansfeld-Vorderort, ends with the surrender of the garrison after a siege of four months.

== July – September ==
- July 6 – The Treaty of Berwick is signed between Queen Elizabeth I of England and King James VI of Scotland.
- July 17 – In England, the Babington Plot, a scheme to murder Queen Elizabeth and to replace her with Mary, Queen of Scots, is discovered. Mary is implicated when she sends a cryptogram letter to Anthony Babington giving the go-ahead for the assassination, and the correspondence is decrypted by Thomas Phelippes.
- July 21 – English explorer Thomas Cavendish begins the first deliberately planned circumnavigation of the globe.
- July 22 – Sir Francis Drake and his crew return to England, arriving at Portsmouth to heroes' welcome.
- August 4 – Conspirator John Ballard is the first person to be arrested by English security agents for the plot to assassinate Queen Elizabeth. Under torture, he implicates Anthony Babington.
- August 13 – In Germany, near Köln, the siege of Rheinberg by Spanish Army commander Alexander Farnese, Duke of Parma begins and is ultimately won by Spain, despite a defense by the Electorate of Cologne as well as Dutch and English troops.
- September 14 – In one of the most spectacular feats of engineering up to that time, devised by Domenico Fontana, the 82 feet (25 m) tall, 327-ton Vatican obelisk is erected at St. Peter's Square in Rome after being transported between April 30 and May 17 from its previous location on orders of Pope Sixtus V.
- September 20 – The executions of the Babington Plot perpetrators begins. Over the two day period, the 14 men convicted of the a plot are hanged, drawn and quartered (the first seven being disembowelled before death) in St Giles Field, London.
- September 22 – Battle of Zutphen: Spanish troops defeat the Dutch rebels and their English allies. English poet and courtier Sir Philip Sidney is mortally wounded.

== October – December ==
- October 15– Mary, Queen of Scots, goes on trial for treason at Fotheringhay Castle in England for complicity in the Babington Plot, in a proceeding that lasts for 10 days.
- October 19– Burmese–Siamese War (1584–1593): Nanda Bayin, King of Burma, launches a two-pronged invasion of the Ayutthaya Kingdom (now Thailand) with 25,000 troops, 1,200 horses and 220 elephants. The invasion will fail, as thousands of troops die from starvation and disease and the Burmese troops will withdraw in April.
- October 25– Mary, Queen of Scots, is convicted of treason and sentenced to death. She will be beheaded on February 8.
- November 19 – English Separatist Puritan Henry Barrowe is imprisoned.
- December 17 – (Tenshō 14, 7th day of the 11th month) The reign of Emperor Ōgimachi of Japan ends, and Emperor Go-Yōzei ascends to the throne.

== Date unknown ==
- Flemish mathematician Simon Stevin publishes a study showing that two objects of different weight fall with the same speed.
- Jacobus Gallus composes his motet O magnum mysterium.
- English topographer William Harrison becomes canon of Windsor.
- António da Madalena from Portugal is the first westerner to visit Angkor Wat.
- English ship Vanguard, the first Royal Navy vessel to bear this name, is launched at Woolwich.
- The cities of Voronezh, Samara, and Tyumen in Russia are founded.

== Births ==
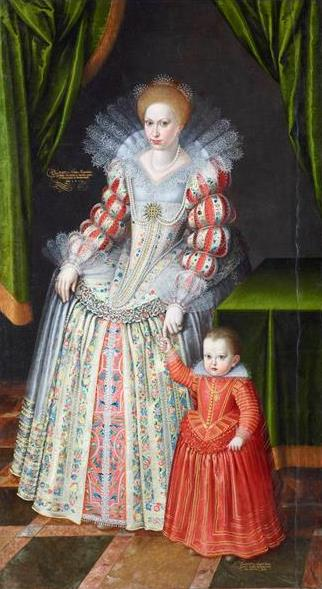
Duchess Magdalene Sibylle of Prussia

- January 1 – Pau Claris i Casademunt, Catalan ecclesiastic (d. 1641)
- January 20 – Johann Hermann Schein, German composer of the early Baroque era (d. 1630)
- January 29 – Louis Frederick, Duke of Württemberg-Montbéliard (1617–1631) (d. 1631)
- February 8 – Jacob Praetorius, German Baroque composer and organist (d. 1651)
- February 15 – Jacques de Bela, French writer (d. 1667)
- February 20 – Hachisuka Yoshishige, Japanese daimyō of the Edo period (d. 1620)
- February 24 – Matthias Faber, German Jesuit priest, writer (d. 1653)
- February 26 – Niccolò Cabeo, Italian Jesuit writer, theologian (d. 1657)
- March 12 – Jean Dolbeau, French missionary (d. 1652)
- March 28 – Domenico Massenzio, Italian baroque composer (d. 1657)
- March 29 – Ludwig Crocius, German Calvinist minister (d. 1653)
- April 2 – Pietro Della Valle, Italian composer (d. 1652)
- April 4 – Richard Saltonstall, English diplomat (d. 1661)
- April 5 – Christopher Levett, English explorer (d. 1630)
- April 9 – Julius Henry, Duke of Saxe-Lauenburg (d. 1665)
- April 12 (bapt.) – John Ford, English dramatist and poet (d. c. 1639)
- April 20 – Saint Rose of Lima, Spanish colonist in Lima (d. 1617)
- April 23 – Martin Rinkart, German clergyman and hymnist (d. 1649)
- April 24 – Henry Hastings, 5th Earl of Huntingdon, English noble (d. 1643)
- May 2 – Étienne de Courcelles, French scholar (d. 1659)
- May 7 – Francesco IV Gonzaga, Duke of Mantua and Montferrat (d. 1612)
- May 9 – Tsugaru Nobuhira, Japanese daimyō (d. 1631)
- May 11 – Angelo Giori, Italian Catholic cardinal (d. 1662)
- May 23 – Paul Siefert, German composer and organist (d. 1666)
- June 24 – George John II, Count Palatine of Lützelstein-Guttenberg, German noble (d. 1654)
- July 1 – Claudio Saracini, Italian composer (d. 1630)
- July 5 – Thomas Hooker, prominent Puritan colonial leader (d. 1647)
- July 6 – Thomas Trevor, English politician and judge (d. 1656)
- July 7 – Thomas Howard, 21st Earl of Arundel, English courtier (d. 1646)
- July 26 – Diego de Colmenares, Spanish historian (d. 1651)
- August 14 – William Hutchinson, founder of Rhode Island (d. 1642)
- August 17 – Johann Valentin Andrea, German theologian (d. 1654)
- September 15 – Antoon Sanders, Dutch priest, historian (d. 1664)
- September 29 – William Lytton, English Member of Parliament (d. 1660)
- October 7 – Isaac Massa, Dutch diplomat (d. 1643)
- October 9 – Leopold V, Archduke of Austria, regent of Tyrol (d. 1632)
- October 20 – Luke Foxe, English explorer (d. 1635)
- October 28 – Francis West, Deputy Governor of the Colony and Dominion of Virginia (d. 1634)
- November 20 – Polykarp Leyser II, German theologian (d. 1633)
- November 22 – Walter Erle, English politician (d. 1665)
- November 23 – Juan Bautista de Lezana, Spanish theologian (d. 1659)
- November 27 – Sir John Wray, 2nd Baronet, English politician (d. 1655)
- November 28 – Sir Thomas Bowyer, 1st Baronet, English politician (d. 1650)
- December 6 – Niccolò Zucchi, Italian astronomer and physicist (d. 1670)
- December 14 – Georg Calixtus, German Lutheran theologian who looked to reconcile all Christendom (d. 1656)
- December 31 – Duchess Magdalene Sibylle of Prussia, Electress of Saxony (d. 1659)
- date unknown – John Mason, English explorer (d. 1635)
- date unknown – Kocc Barma Fall, Senegambian philosopher (d. 1655)
- probable
  - Giles Fletcher, English poet (d. 1623)
  - David HaLevi Segal, Polish Jewish rabbi (d. 1667)

== Deaths ==
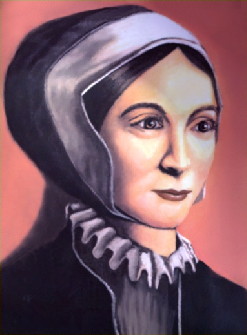
Saint Margaret Clitherow

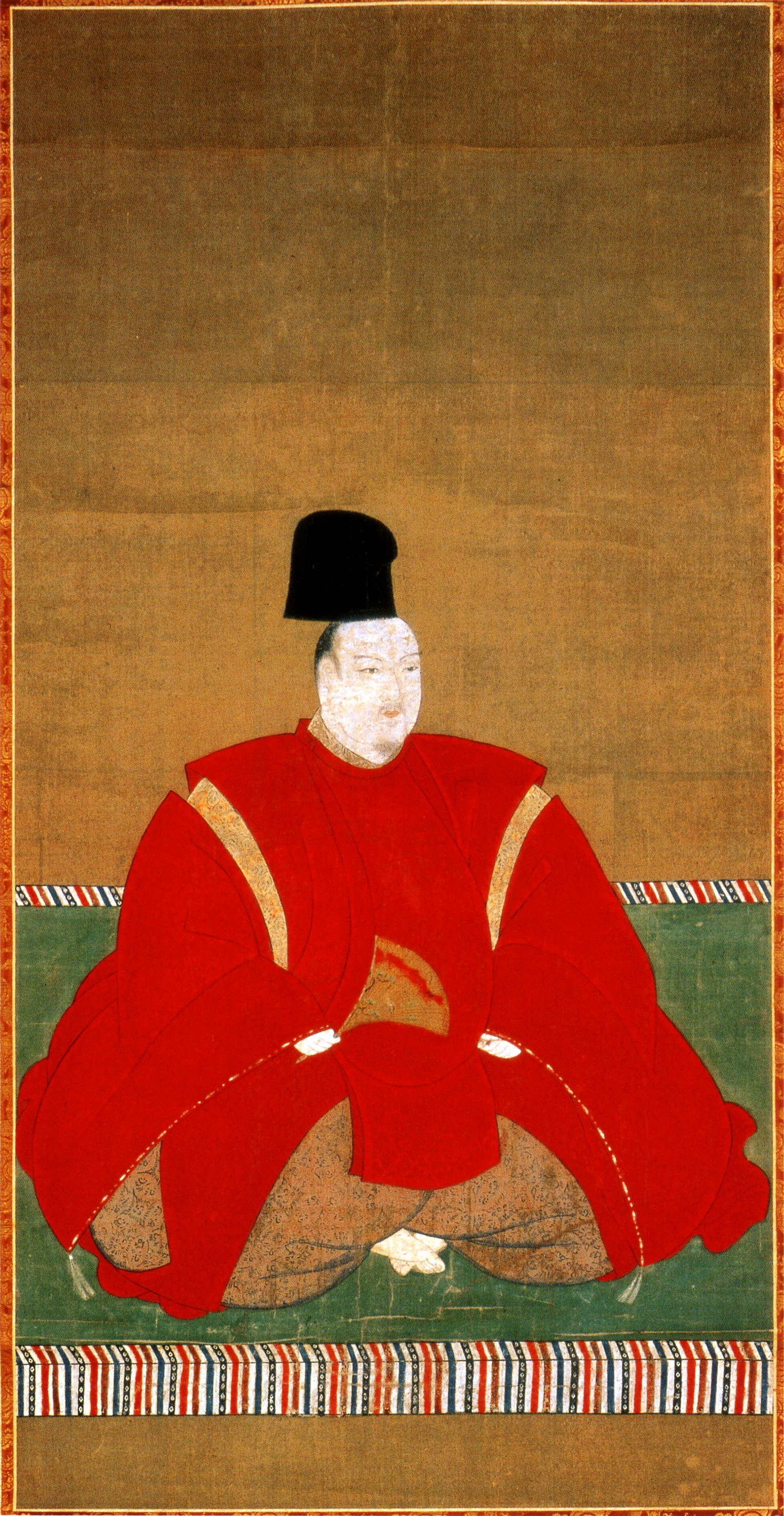
Prince Masahito

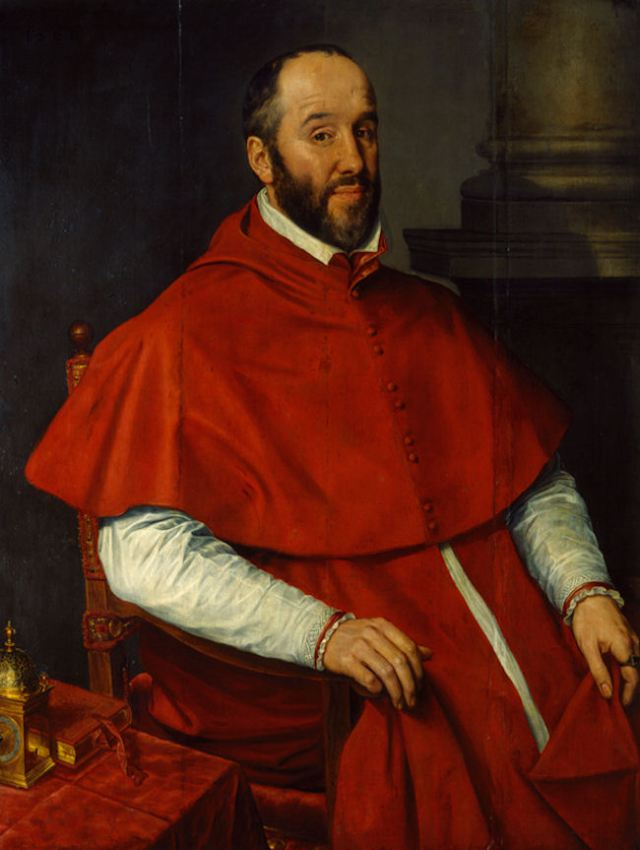
Antoine Perrenot de Granvelle

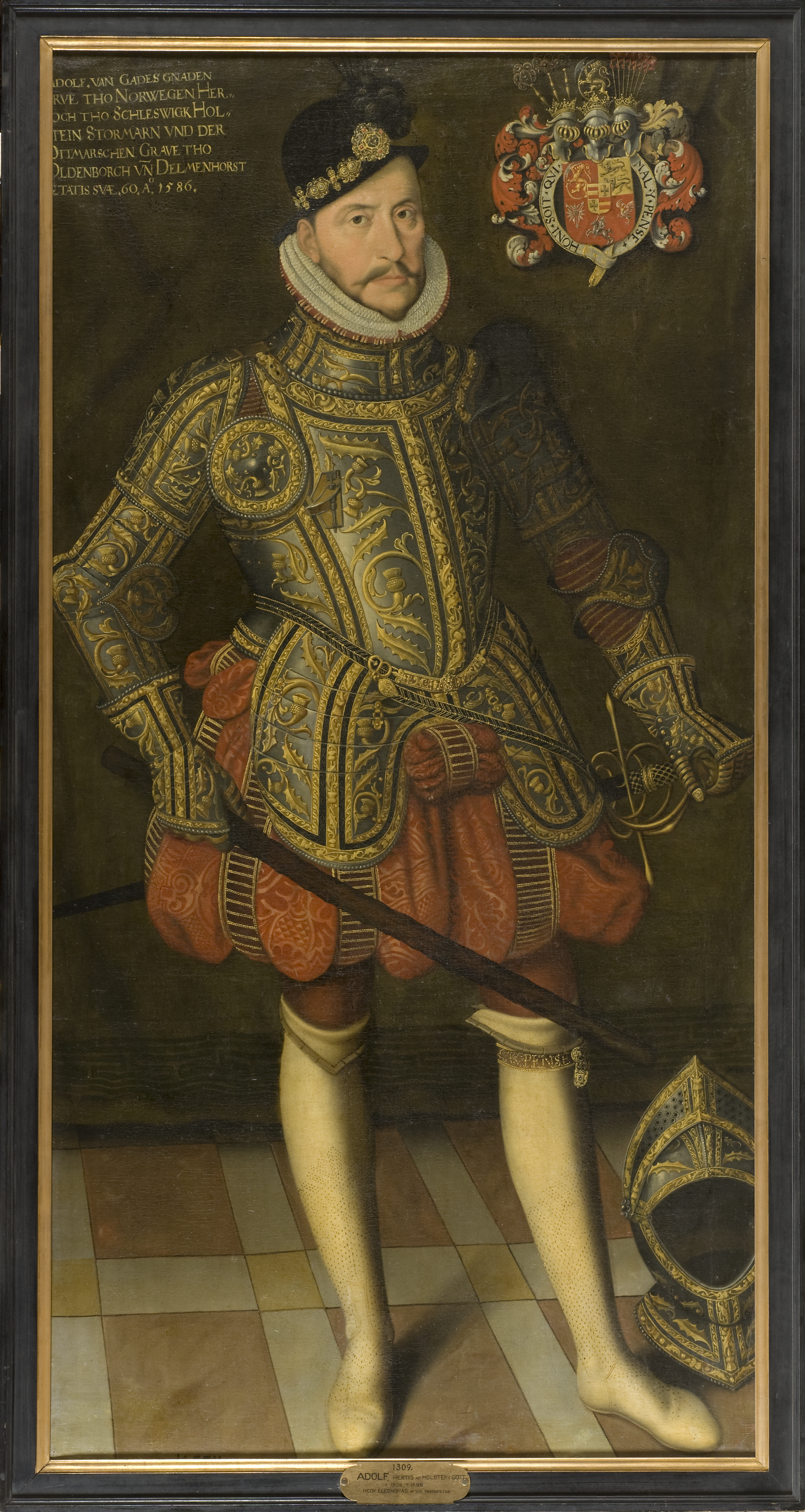
Adolf, Duke of Holstein-Gottorp

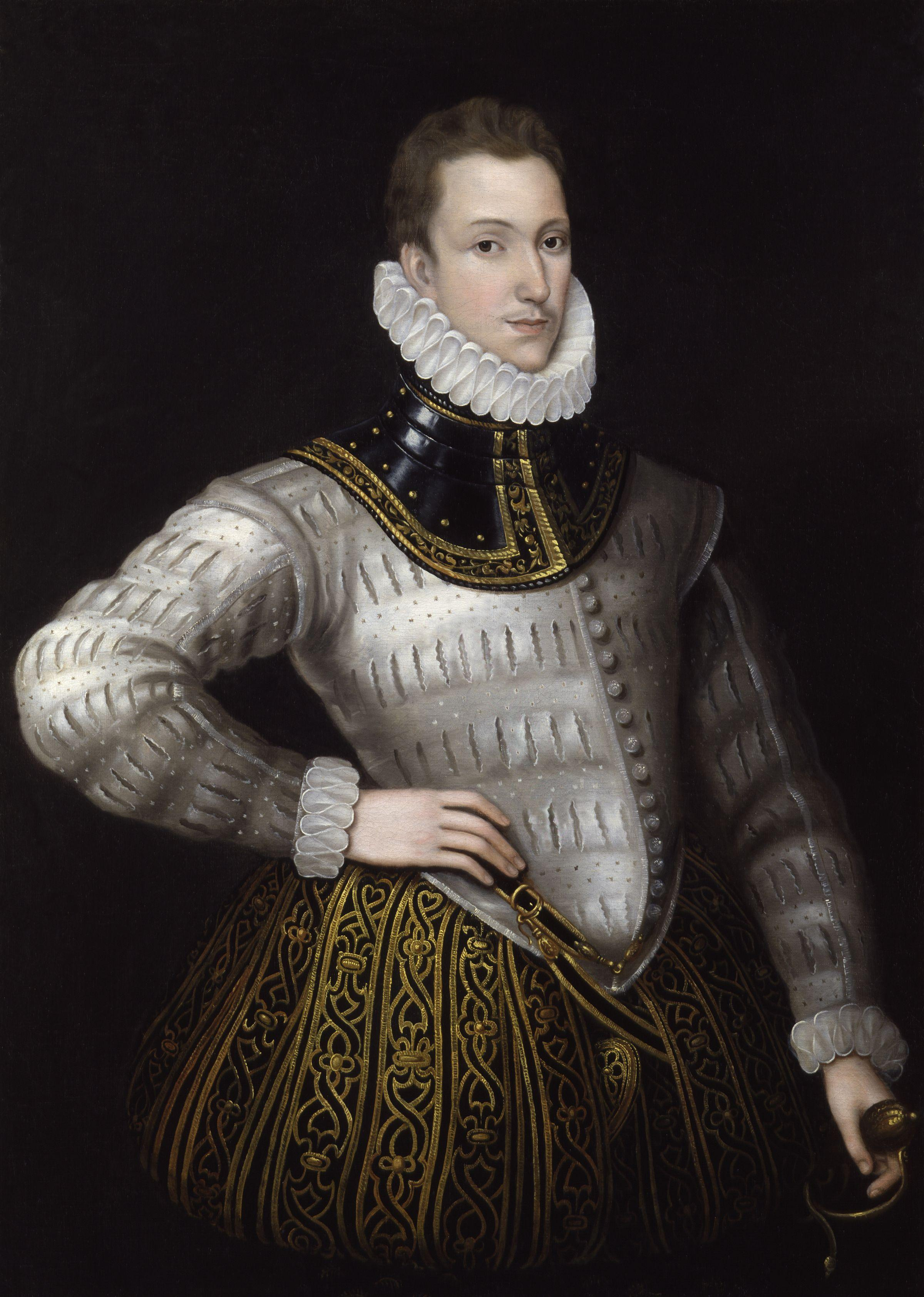
Philip Sidney

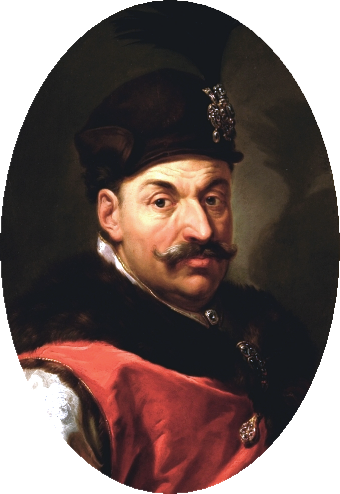
King Stefan Batory

- January 18 – Margaret of Austria, regent of the Netherlands (b. 1522)
- January 25 – Lucas Cranach the Younger, German painter (b. 1515)
- February 11 – Augustus, Elector of Saxony (b. 1526)
- March 1 – Amalia of Cleves, German princess and writer (b. 1517)
- March 25 – Margaret Clitherow, English Roman Catholic nun, saint and martyr (b. 1556)
- March 30 – Anna of Veldenz, Margrave of Baden (b. 1540)
- April 8 – Martin Chemnitz, Lutheran reformer (b. 1522)
- May 5 – Henry Sidney, Lord Deputy of Ireland (b. 1529)
- May 7 – George II of Brieg, Duke of Brieg (1547–1586) (b. 1523)
- May 9 – Luis de Morales, Spanish religious painter (b. 1510)
- May 29 – Adam Lonicer, German botanist (b. 1528)
- June 1 – Martín de Azpilcueta, Spanish theologian and economist (b. 1491)
- June 5 – Matthew Wesenbeck, Belgian jurist (b. 1531)
- June 9 – Filippo Boncompagni, Italian Catholic cardinal (b. 1548)
- June 28 – Primož Trubar, Carniolan Protestant reformer (b. 1508)
- July 5 – Ludwig Lavater, Swiss Reformed theologian (b. 1527)
- July 12 – Edward Sutton, 4th Baron Dudley (b. 1525)
- August 1 – Richard Maitland, Scottish statesman and historian (b. 1496)
- September 7 – Prince Masahito, member of the Japanese imperial family (b. 1552)
- September 18 – Ottavio Farnese, Duke of Parma (b. 1521)
- September 20
  - Sir Anthony Babington, English Catholic conspirator (executed) (b. 1561)
  - Chidiock Tichborne, English conspirator and poet (executed) (b. 1558)
- September 21 – Antoine Perrenot de Granvelle, French Roman Catholic cardinal (b. 1517)
- October 1 – Adolf, Duke of Holstein-Gottorp (b. 1526)
- October 15 – Elizabeth of Denmark, Duchess of Mecklenburg, Danish princess (b. 1524)
- October 17 – Philip Sidney, English poet, courtier and soldier (b. 1554)
- October 28 – John Günther I, Count of Schwarzburg-Sondershausen (b. 1532)
- November 6 – Willem IV van den Bergh, Stadtholder of Guelders and Zutphen (b. 1537)
- December 6 – Joachim Ernest, Prince of Anhalt (b. 1536)
- December 12 – Stefan Batory, King of Poland (b. 1533)
- December 30 – Luigi d'Este, Italian Catholic cardinal (b. 1538)
