= 1653 =

1653 in various calendars
- Gregorian calendar: 1653; MDCLIII
- Ab urbe condita: 2406
- Armenian calendar: 1102; ԹՎ ՌՃԲ
- Assyrian calendar: 6403
- Balinese saka calendar: 1574–1575
- Bengali calendar: 1059–1060
- Berber calendar: 2603
- English Regnal year: 4 Cha. 2 – 5 Cha. 2 (Interregnum)
- Buddhist calendar: 2197
- Burmese calendar: 1015
- Byzantine calendar: 7161–7162
- Chinese calendar: 壬辰年 (Water Dragon); 4350 or 4143 — to — 癸巳年 (Water Snake); 4351 or 4144
- Coptic calendar: 1369–1370
- Discordian calendar: 2819
- Ethiopian calendar: 1645–1646
- Hebrew calendar: 5413–5414
- Hindu calendars
- Vikram Samvat: 1709–1710
- Shaka Samvat: 1574–1575
- Kali Yuga: 4753–4754
- Holocene calendar: 11653
- Igbo calendar: 653–654
- Iranian calendar: 1031–1032
- Islamic calendar: 1063–1064
- Japanese calendar: Jōō 2 (承応２年)
- Javanese calendar: 1574–1576
- Julian calendar: Gregorian minus 10 days
- Korean calendar: 3986
- Minguo calendar: 259 before ROC 民前259年
- Nanakshahi calendar: 185
- Thai solar calendar: 2195–2196
- Tibetan calendar: ཆུ་ཕོ་འབྲུག་ལོ་ (male Water-Dragon); 1779 or 1398 or 626 — to — ཆུ་མོ་སྦྲུལ་ལོ་ (female Water-Snake); 1780 or 1399 or 627

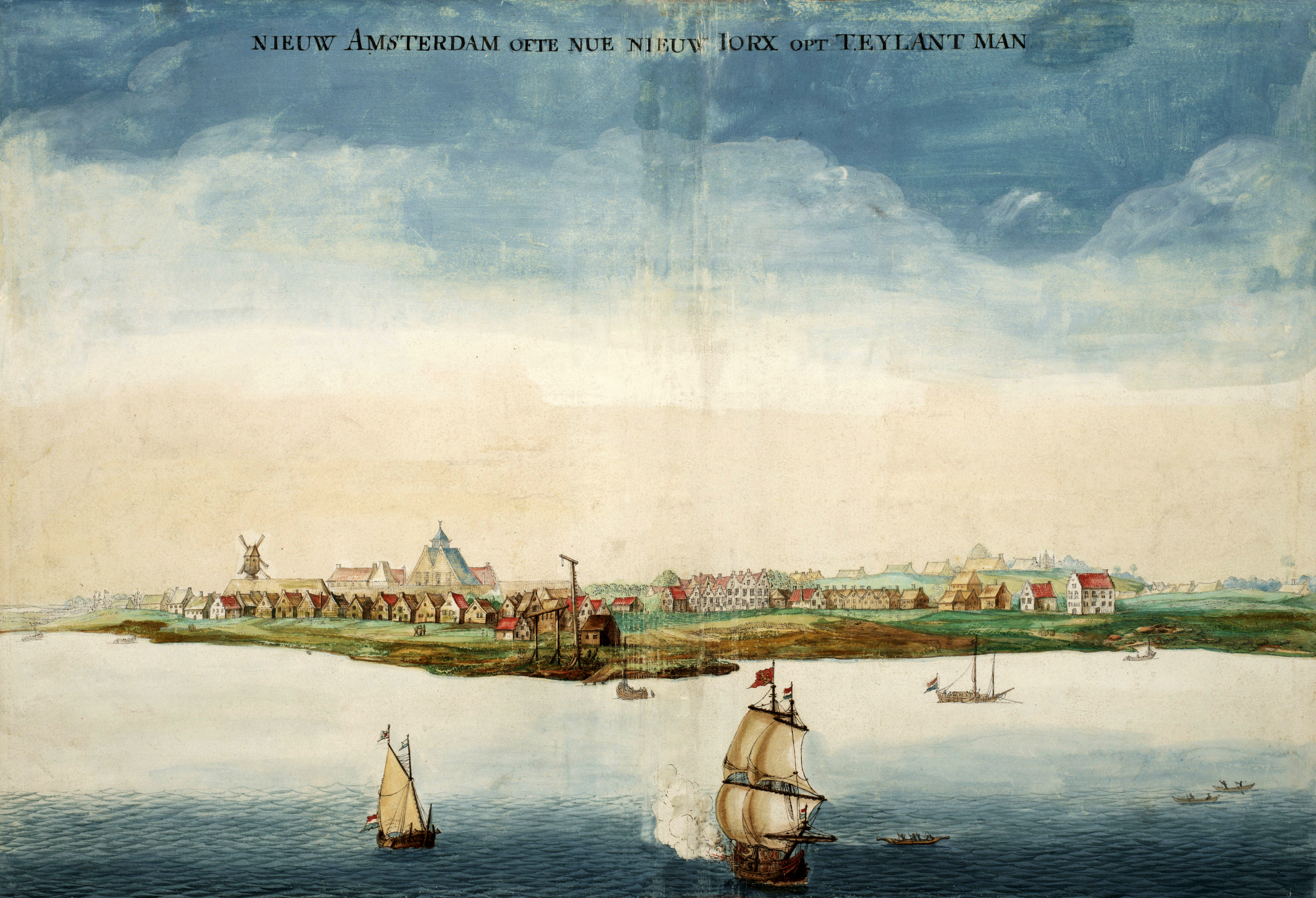
February 2: New Amsterdam (now New York City) is incorporated.

1653 (MDCLIII) was a common year starting on Wednesday of the Gregorian calendar and a common year starting on Saturday of the Julian calendar, the 1653rd year of the Common Era (CE) and Anno Domini (AD) designations, the 653rd year of the 2nd millennium, the 53rd year of the 17th century, and the 4th year of the 1650s decade. As of the start of 1653, the Gregorian calendar was 10 days ahead of the Julian calendar, which remained in localized use until 1923.

== Events ==
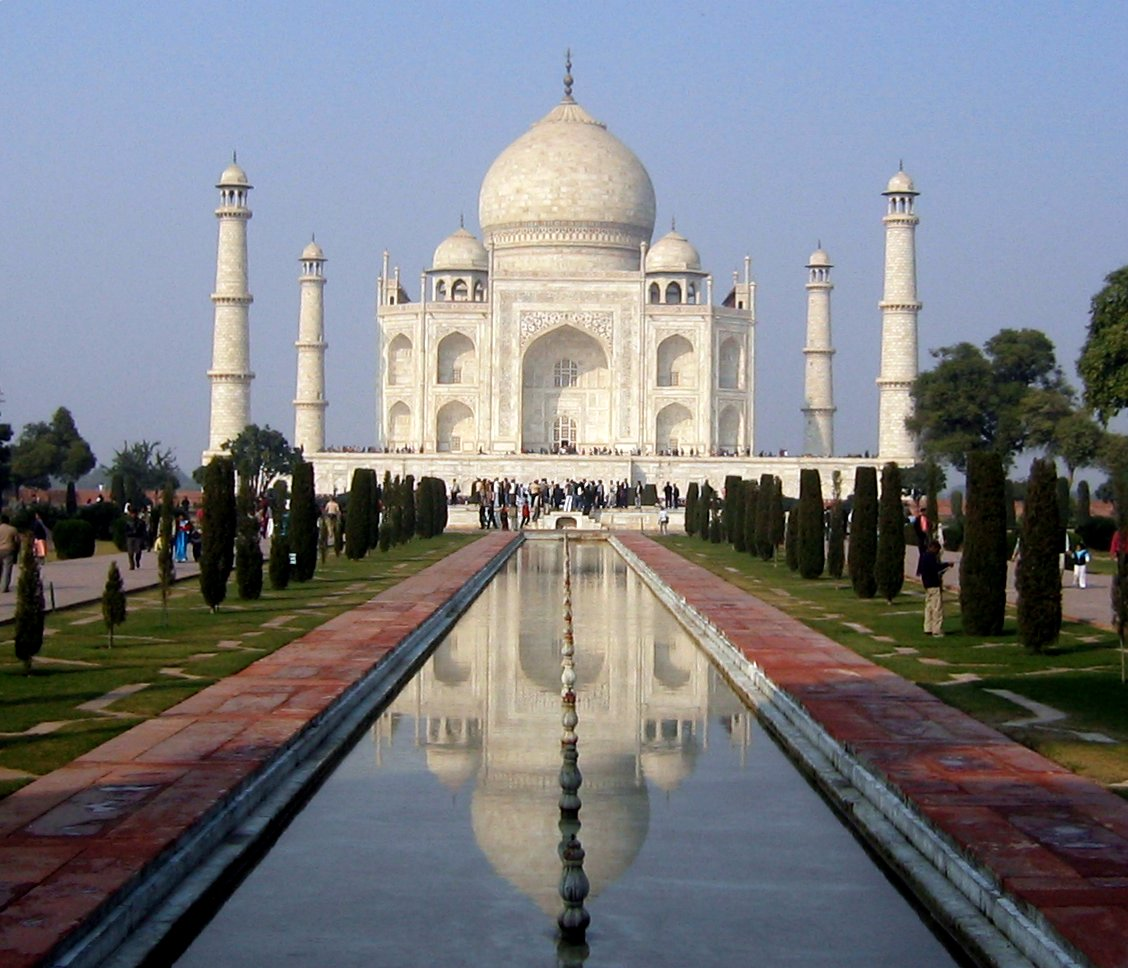
Taj Mahal mausoleum is completed.

=== January–March ===
- January 3 – By the Coonan Cross Oath, the Eastern Church in India cuts itself off from colonial Portuguese tutelage.
- January – The Swiss Peasant War begins after magistrates meeting at Lucerne refuse to hear from a group of peasants who have been financially hurt by the devaluation of the currency issued from Bern.
- February 2 – New Amsterdam (now New York City) received municipal rights by a charter from New Netherland Governor Peter Stuyvesant.
- February 3 – Cardinal Mazarin returns to Paris from exile.
- February 10 – Swiss peasant war of 1653: Peasants from the Entlebuch valley in Switzerland assemble at Heiligkreuz to organize a plan to suspend all tax payments to the authorities in the canton of Lucerne, after having been snubbed at a magisterial meeting in Lucerne. More communities in the canton join in an alliance concluded at Wolhusen on February 26.
- February – The Morning Star Rebellion (Morgonstjärneupproret) of peasants breaks out in Sweden's province of Närke, against Queen Christina. It is brutally suppressed by April, and its leader, the self-proclaimed King Olof Mårtensson (who uses a morning star as his scepter) is executed on a breaking wheel on April 6.
- March 14 – A Dutch fleet defeats the English in the Battle of Leghorn in the Mediterranean but the Dutch commander, Johan van Galen, later dies of his wounds.

=== April–June ===
- April 20 – Oliver Cromwell expels the Rump Parliament in England.
- April 28 – The Great Fire of Marlborough destroys 224 houses and much of the textile businesses in the Wiltshire town which, "at that date was one of considerable importance, and had merchants of affluence and repute."
- May 31 – Ferdinand IV, already the King of Bohemia, Hungary and Croatia, is elected King of the Romans by his fellow German monarchs, making him eligible to succeed his father Ferdinand III as Holy Roman Emperor. Ferdinand IV will not live to become Holy Roman Emperor, instead dying from smallpox 14 months after his designation.
- June 13 – First Anglo-Dutch War: The English navy defeats the Dutch fleet in the Battle of the Gabbard after a two-day fight.
- June 20 – The Swiss peasant war of 1653 ends after Swiss Army troops under the command of Sebastian Peregrin Zwyer suppress the last rebels in Switzerland's Entlebuch Valley.

=== July–September ===
- July 4 – Barebone's Parliament, named for a prominent Puritan member, Praise-God Barebone, opens its session in London with elected representatives to pass laws for the Commonwealth of England.
- July 8 – John Thurloe becomes Cromwell's head of intelligence.
- August 5 – Frederick William, Elector of Brandenburg reaffirms the nobility's freedom from taxation, and its unlimited control over the peasants, in return for a grant to him of 530,000 silver Joachimsthalers to be paid in installments over six years.
- August 8 – The petite post, a system of postage using prepaid labels and post boxes, is inaugurated in Paris by Jean-Jacques Renouard de Villayer for the mailing of letters within the city, an event noted by Madeleine de Scudéry in her manuscript Chroniques du samedi.
- August 10 – The Battle of Scheveningen, the final naval battle of the First Anglo-Dutch War, ends after three days of fighting off the island of Texel, as the English Navy gains a tactical victory over the Dutch fleet.
- September 13 – A violent storm off the west coast of Scotland sinks the English Navy warship Swan, and the commandeered merchantmen Speedwell and Martha and Margaret, all of which have been anchored off of Mull. Most of the crews had gone ashore, but 23 of the men on the ship Speedwell are killed.
- September 29 – In India, the third and final attempt by the Mughal Empire, to recapture the city of Kandahar from the Safavid Empire, ends in failure after almost six months despite the presence of 70,000 Mughal soldiers under the command of Prince Dara Shukoh.

=== October–December ===
- October 11 (October 1 O.S.) – The Zemsky Sobor, the Russian Empire's national assembly, opens its session to declare a war against the Kingdom of Poland.
- October 20 – The Battle of Bordeaux is fought between French and Spanish warships in the Gironde estuary of France as part of the Franco-Spanish War. The Spanish fleet of 30 warships, under the command of Álvaro de Bazán y Manrique de Lara, Marquis of Santa Cruz, overwhelms the French fleet of César, Duke of Vendôme and captures ten galleys and brigantines, as well as burning four other warships and 15 barges.
- October 25 – Erdeni Bumba, the wife and chief consort of China's Shunzhi Emperor, is demoted from being the empress to being a concubine.
- October 29 – Pierre-Esprit Radisson, a French Canadian teenager who had been captured by a Mohawk raiding party two years earlier and then tortured, escapes captivity in what is now the U.S. state of New York.
- November 8 – The Battle of Arronches takes place near the town of Arronches on the Portuguese side of the border between Portugal and Spain, with the Portuguese Army outflanking and defeating a larger Spanish force.
- November 16 – The Krishnanattam, a series of eight dance dramas written by Mana Veda, Zamorin of Calicut in India to tell the epic of the Hindu god Krishna, is completed.
- November 30 – Jacques Dyel du Parquet completes his installment payments, totaling 41,500 French livres, to become the exclusive owner of the Caribbean islands of Martinique, Grenada, Saint Lucia and the Grenadines.
- November – John Casor, a servant of African descent in Northampton County of the colony of Virginia, leaves Anthony Johnson's farm, after claiming his contract of indenture had expired, and goes to work for a new employer, Robert Parker. Johnson sues Parker, claiming that Casor is a slave for life, rather than an indentured servant, and the court issues a landmark ruling on March 8, 1655, establishing African-Americans as property.
- December 7 – The Moti Masjid, an Islamic mosque made completely of white marble and within the walls of the Agra Fort in what is now the city of Agra in the Indian state of Uttar Pradesh, is dedicated by the Mughal Emperor, Shah Jahan, on 16 Muharram 1064.
- December 12 – The dissolution of Barebone's Parliament is voted by its members after having passed laws for the Commonwealth of England.
- December 16 – The Instrument of Government in England becomes Britain's first written constitution, under which Oliver Cromwell becomes Lord Protector of England, Scotland, and Ireland, being advised by a remodelled English Council of State. This is the start of The First Protectorate, bringing an end to the first period of republican government in the country, the Commonwealth of England.

=== Date unknown ===
- Marcello Malpighi, an Italian pioneer of microscopical anatomy becomes a doctor of medicine.
- Stephen Bachiler, a clergyman and early advocate for the separation of church and state returns to England after having spent more than 20 years overseas in the Massachusetts Bay Colony.
- The gardens surrounding the Taj Mahal mausoleum are completed at Agra.

== Births ==
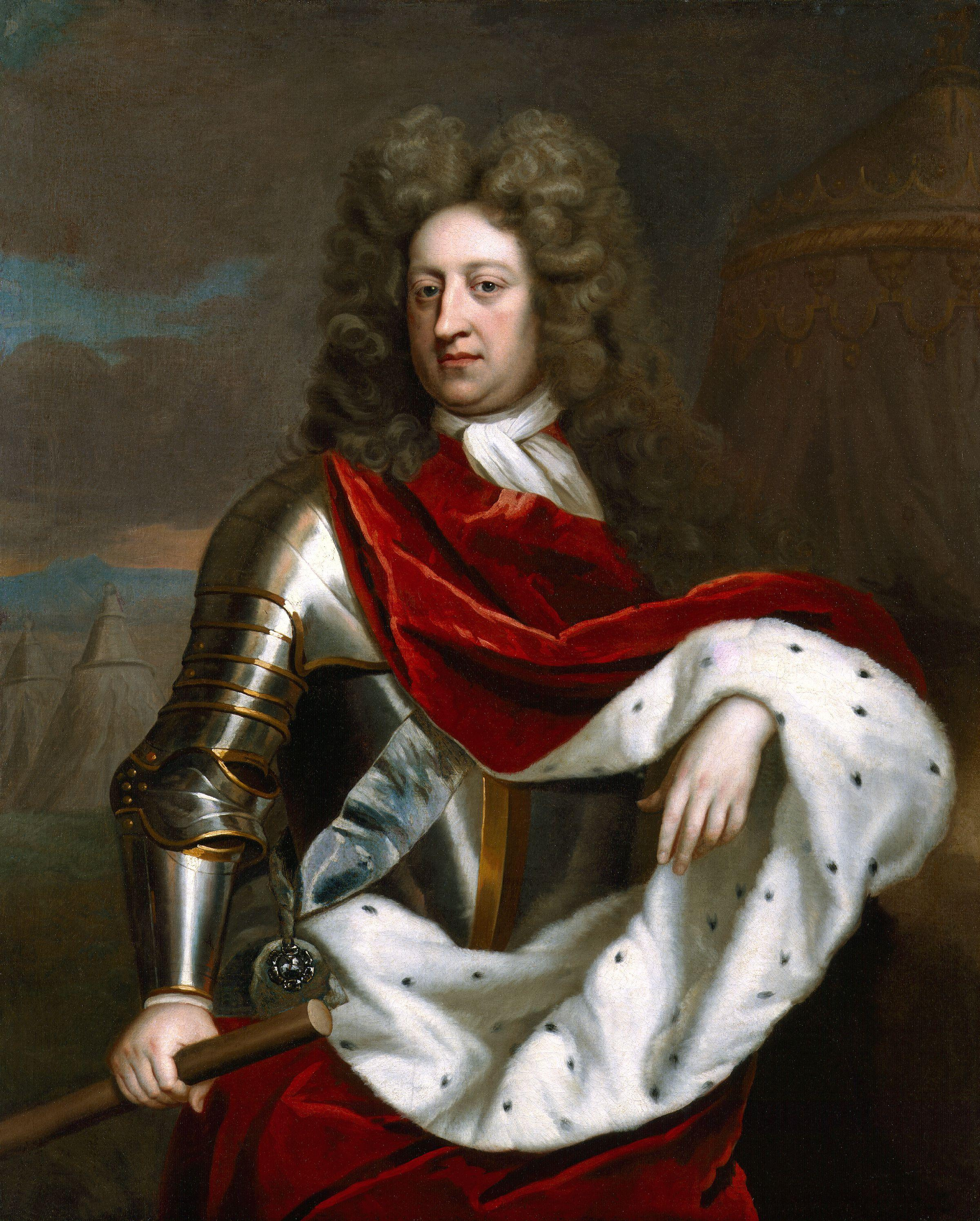
Prince George of Denmark

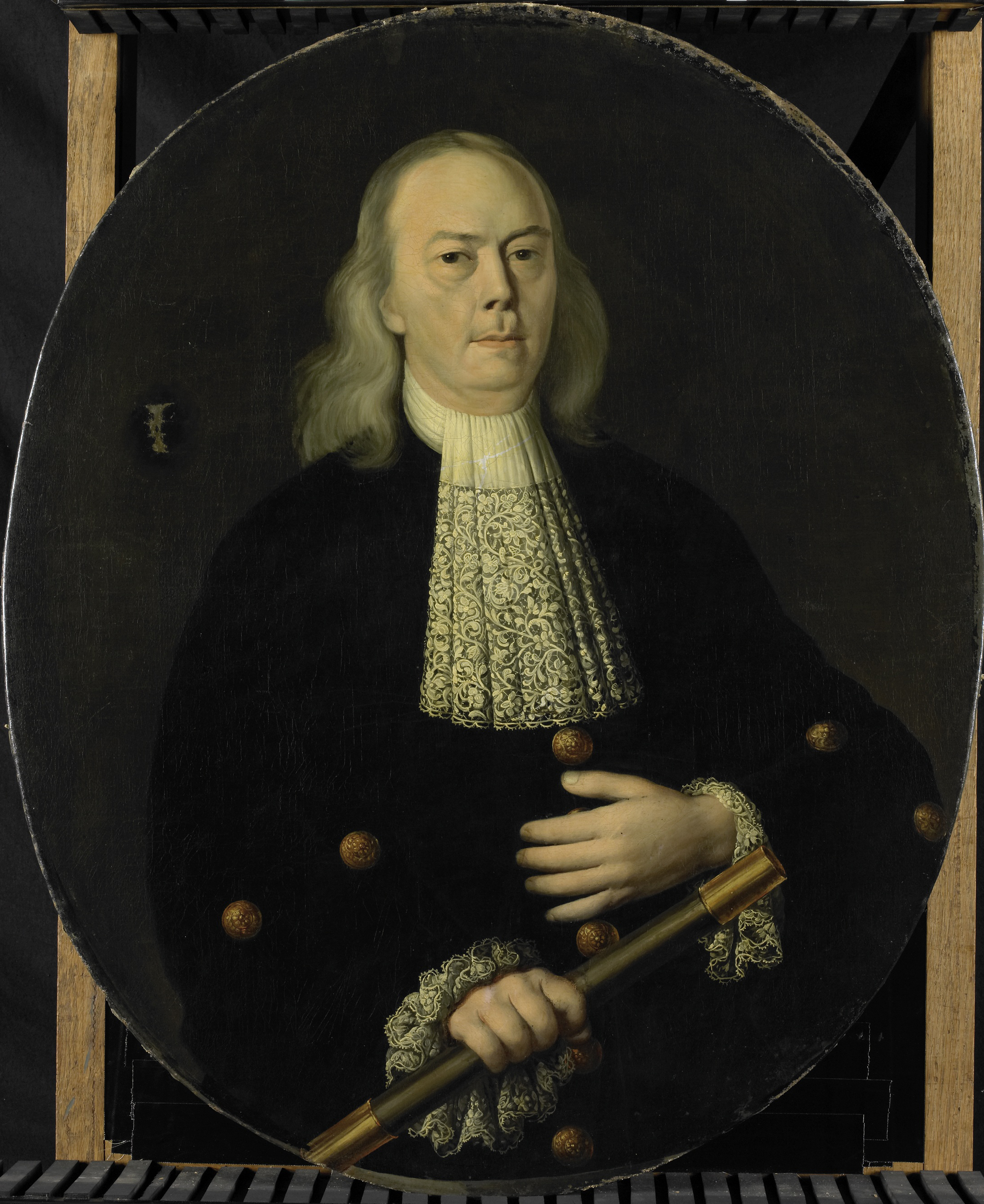
Abraham van Riebeeck

- January 6 – Christian, Duke of Saxe-Eisenberg (d. 1707)
- January 10 – Caspar Herman Hausmann, Danish-Norwegian general (d. 1718)
- January 11 – Anthony Günther, Prince of Anhalt-Zerbst, German prince (d. 1714)
- January 11 – Paolo Alessandro Maffei, Italian antiquarian, humanist (d. 1716)
- January 14 – Robert Price (judge), British judge and politician (d. 1733)
- January 16 – Johann Conrad Brunner, Swiss anatomist (d. 1727)
- January 24 – Dom Jacques Alexandre, French Benedictine (d. 1734)
- January 31 – William Tempest (politician), English Member of Parliament (d. 1700)
- January 31 – Anna Catherine of Nassau-Ottweiler, Wild and Rhinegravine of Salm-Dhaun by marriage (d. 1731)
- February 12 – Giovanni Francesco Grossi, Italian opera singer (d. 1697)
- February 17 – Arcangelo Corelli, Italian composer (d. 1713)
- February 22 – Martín de Ursúa, Spanish conquistador (d. 1715)
- February 22 – Elisabeth Johanna of Veldenz, Wild and Rhinegravine of Salm-Kyrburg (d. 1718)
- February 22 – Vidal Marín del Campo, Spanish Grand Inquisitor (d. 1709)
- March 1 – Jean-Baptiste-Henri de Valincour, French classical scholar (d. 1730)
- March 1 – Pacificus of San Severino, Italian saint (d. 1721)
- March 8 – Goodwin Wharton, British politician (d. 1704)
- March 10 – John Kettlewell, English clergyman (d. 1695)
- March 10 – John Benbow, English Royal Navy Admiral (d. 1702)
- March 21 – John Hampden (1653–1696), English politician (d. 1696)
- March 24 – Joseph Sauveur, French mathematician (d. 1716)
- April 2 – Prince George of Denmark, consort of Anne, Queen of Great Britain (d. 1708)
- April 2 – Egidio Quinto, Serbian Catholic bishop (d. 1722)
- April 6 – Frederick Louis, Duke of Schleswig-Holstein-Sonderburg-Beck (d. 1728)
- April 19 – William Sewel, Dutch historian (d. 1720)
- April 25 – Benedetto Pamphili, Italian cardinal, patron of the arts, composer and librettist (d. 1730)
- April 25 – Sir John Bowyer, 2nd Baronet, English politician (d. 1691)
- May 3 – Archibald Douglas, 1st Earl of Forfar, Scottish peer (d. 1712)
- May 8 – Claude Louis Hector de Villars, Marshal of France (d. 1734)
- May 21 – Eleanor of Austria, Queen of Poland (d. 1697)
- May 21 – Christopher Vane, 1st Baron Barnard, English politician and peer (d. 1723)
- May 22 – Peter Gott, English politician (d. 1712)
- May 30 – Claudia Felicitas of Austria, Holy Roman Empress (d. 1676)
- June 1 – Georg Muffat, German composer and organist (d. 1704)
- June 11 – Gaspar de la Cerda, 8th Count of Galve (d. 1697)
- June 12 – Maria Amalia of Courland, Landgravine of Hesse-Kassel (d. 1711)
- June 16 – James Bertie, 1st Earl of Abingdon, English nobleman (d. 1699)
- June 20 – Richard Maitland, 4th Earl of Lauderdale, Scottish politician (d. 1695)
- June 26 – André-Hercule de Fleury, Catholic Cardinal and chief minister of France under Louis XV (d. 1743)
- June 28 – Muhammad Azam Shah, Mughal emperor (d. 1707)
- July 4 – Sir Walter Clarges, 1st Baronet, English politician (d. 1706)
- July 5 – Thomas Pitt, British Governor of Madras (d. 1726)
- July 11 – Sarah Good, accused Massachusetts witch (d. 1692)
- August 9 – John Oldham, English poet (d. 1683)
- August 10 – Louis-Guillaume Pécour, French dancer and choreographer (d. 1729)
- August 14 – Christopher Monck, 2nd Duke of Albemarle, English statesman (d. 1688)
- August 15 – Johann Friedrich Gleditsch, German book publisher (d. 1716)
- August 18 – Julius Siegmund, Duke of Württemberg-Juliusburg (d. 1684)
- August 28 – Jesper Swedberg, Swedish hymnwriter (d. 1735)
- September 1 – Johann Pachelbel, German organist and composer (d. 1706)
- September 3 – Roger North, English lawyer and biographer (d. 1734)
- September 4 – Henry Wise (gardener), English gardener (d. 1738)
- September 8 – Sir Walter Yonge, 3rd Baronet, English politician (d. 1731)
- September 8 – Fuquan (prince), Chinese Qing Dynasty prince (d. 1703)
- September 17 – Sir Henry Monson, 3rd Baronet, English politician (d. 1718)
- October 1 – Sir George Speke, 2nd Baronet, English politician (d. 1683)
- October 8 – Michel Baron, French actor (d. 1729)
- October 10 – Anton Günther II, Count of Schwarzburg-Sondershausen-Arnstadt (d. 1716)
- October 18 – Abraham van Riebeeck, Governor-General of the Dutch East Indies (d. 1713)
- November 11 – Carlo Ruzzini, Doge of Venice (d. 1735)
- November 14 – Jean-Baptiste de La Croix de Chevrières de Saint-Vallier, Catholic bishop of Quebec (d. 1727)
- November 19 – Christian II, Duke of Saxe-Merseburg (d. 1694)
- November 26 – Empress Xiaochengren, Chinese Qing Dynasty empress (d. 1674)
- November 29 – Thomas Cromwell, 3rd Earl of Ardglass, English nobleman (d. 1682)
- December 3 – Giovanni Battista Tolomei, Italian Jesuit priest, theologian and cardinal (d. 1726)
- December 26 – Johann Conrad Peyer, Swiss anatomist (d. 1712)
- December 28 – Mary Howard, of the Holy Cross, English nun of the Poor Clares (d. 1735)
- date unknown
  - Chikamatsu Monzaemon, Japanese playwright (d. 1725)
  - Rahman Baba, Afghan Pashto Sufi poet (d. 1711)
  - Johann Pachelbel, German composer (d. 1706)

== Deaths ==
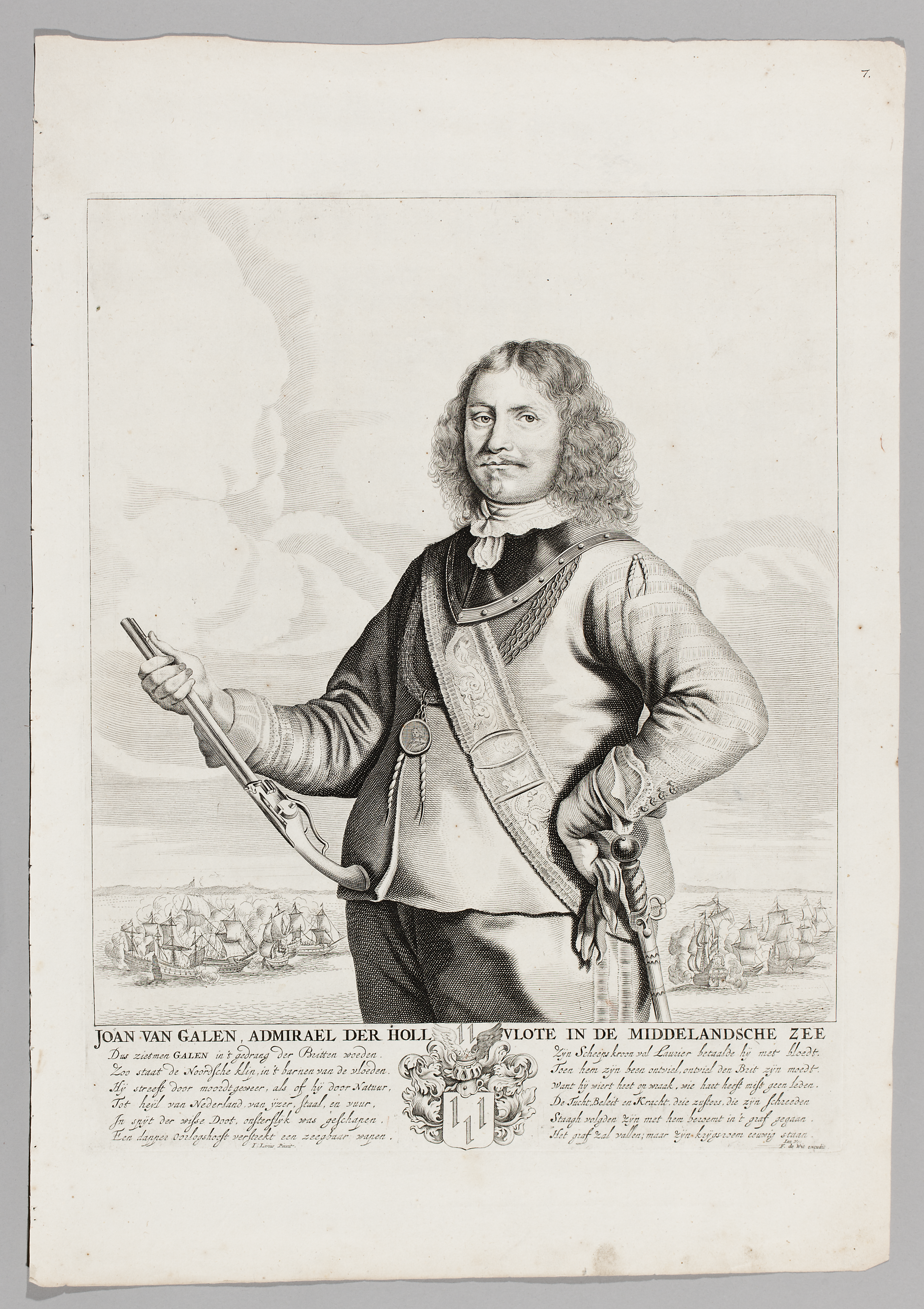
Johan van Galen

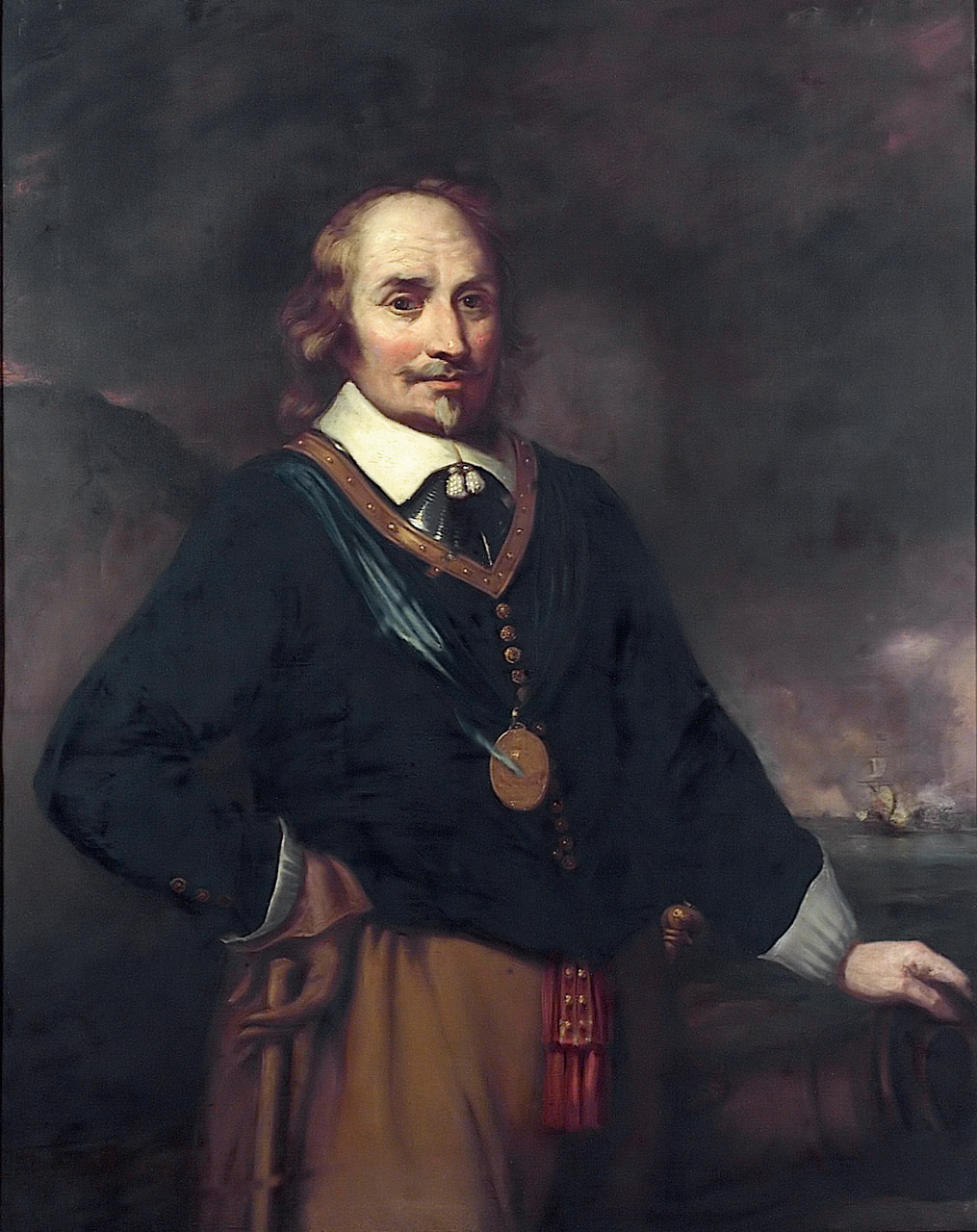
Maarten Tromp

- January 14 – George Rudolf of Liegnitz, Polish noble (b. 1595)
- January 21 – John Digby, 1st Earl of Bristol, English diplomat (b. 1580)
- February 13 – Georg Rudolf Weckherlin, German poet (b. 1584)
- February 16 – Johannes Schultz, German composer (b. 1582)
- February 20 – Luigi Rossi, Italian composer (b. 1597)
- February 21 – Adriaan Pauw, Grand Pensionary of Holland (b. 1585)
- February 27 – Diego López Pacheco, 7th Duke of Escalona, Spanish noble (b. 1599)
- March 6 – Juan de Dicastillo, Spanish theologian (b. 1584)
- March 23 – Johan van Galen, Dutch naval officer (b. 1604)
- May 13 – Teodósio, Prince of Brazil, Portuguese prince (b. 1634)
- May 26 – Robert Filmer, English writer (b. 1588)
- March 10 – Count John Louis of Nassau-Hadamar (b. 1590)
- March 25 – Nicholas Martyn, English politician (b. 1593)
- March 30 – Mikołaj Łęczycki, Polish Jesuit (b. 1574)
- April 20 – Celestyn Myślenta, Polish theologian (b. 1588)
- April 26 – Matthias Faber, German Jesuit priest and writer (b. 1586)
- May 11 – Petronio Veroni, Roman Catholic prelate, Bishop of Boiano (1652–1653) (b. 1600)
- May 19 – Elizabeth Lucretia, Duchess of Cieszyn, Duchess suo jure of Cieszyn (b. 1599)
- June 5 – Federico Baldissera Bartolomeo Cornaro, Italian Catholic cardinal (b. 1579)
- June 26 – Juliana Morell, Spanish-French scholar (b. 1594)
- July 10 – Gabriel Naudé, French librarian and scholar (b. 1600)
- July 31 – Thomas Dudley, Governor of Massachusetts Bay Colony (b. 1576)
- August 10 – Maarten Tromp, Dutch admiral (b. 1598)
- August 22 – Augustus, Prince of Anhalt-Plötzkau, German prince (b. 1575)
- September 3 – Claudius Salmasius, French classical scholar (b. 1588)
- September 14 – Wolfgang Wilhelm, Count Palatine of Neuburg, Duke of Jülich and Berg (b. 1578)
- September 26 – Charles de l'Aubespine, marquis de Châteauneuf, French diplomat and government official (b. 1580)
- October 3 – Marcus Zuerius van Boxhorn, Dutch scholar (b. 1612)
- October 7 – Fausto Poli, Italian Catholic prelate and cardinal (b. 1581)
- October 22 – Thomas de Critz, British artist (b. 1607)
- October 25 – Gustav, Count of Vasaborg, illegitimate son of King Gustavus Adolphus and his mistress Margareta Slots (b. 1616)
- November 17 – Joana, Princess of Beira, Portuguese infanta (princess) (b. 1635)
- December 7 – Ludwig Crocius, German Calvinist minister (b. 1586)
- December 21 – Elisabeth of Schleswig-Holstein-Sonderburg, Duchess consort of Pomerania (b. 1580)
- December 28 – Giovanni Battista Rinuccini, archbishop of Fermo (b. 1592)
- date unknown
  - Lucrezia Marinella, Italian poet and author (b. 1571)
  - Jusepa Vaca, Spanish stage actress (b. 1589)
  - Constantia Zierenberg, German-Polish singer (b. 1605)
  - George Skutt, English merchant and politician
