= 1584 =

1584 in various calendars
- Gregorian calendar: 1584; MDLXXXIV
- Ab urbe condita: 2337
- Armenian calendar: 1033; ԹՎ ՌԼԳ
- Assyrian calendar: 6334
- Balinese saka calendar: 1505–1506
- Bengali calendar: 990–991
- Berber calendar: 2534
- English Regnal year: 26 Eliz. 1 – 27 Eliz. 1
- Buddhist calendar: 2128
- Burmese calendar: 946
- Byzantine calendar: 7092–7093
- Chinese calendar: 癸未年 (Water Goat); 4281 or 4074 — to — 甲申年 (Wood Monkey); 4282 or 4075
- Coptic calendar: 1300–1301
- Discordian calendar: 2750
- Ethiopian calendar: 1576–1577
- Hebrew calendar: 5344–5345
- Hindu calendars
- Vikram Samvat: 1640–1641
- Shaka Samvat: 1505–1506
- Kali Yuga: 4684–4685
- Holocene calendar: 11584
- Igbo calendar: 584–585
- Iranian calendar: 962–963
- Islamic calendar: 991–992
- Japanese calendar: Tenshō 12 (天正１２年)
- Javanese calendar: 1503–1504
- Julian calendar: Gregorian minus 10 days
- Korean calendar: 3917
- Minguo calendar: 328 before ROC 民前328年
- Nanakshahi calendar: 116
- Thai solar calendar: 2126–2127
- Tibetan calendar: ཆུ་མོ་ལུག་ལོ་ (female Water-Sheep); 1710 or 1329 or 557 — to — ཤིང་ཕོ་སྤྲེ་ལོ་ (male Wood-Monkey); 1711 or 1330 or 558

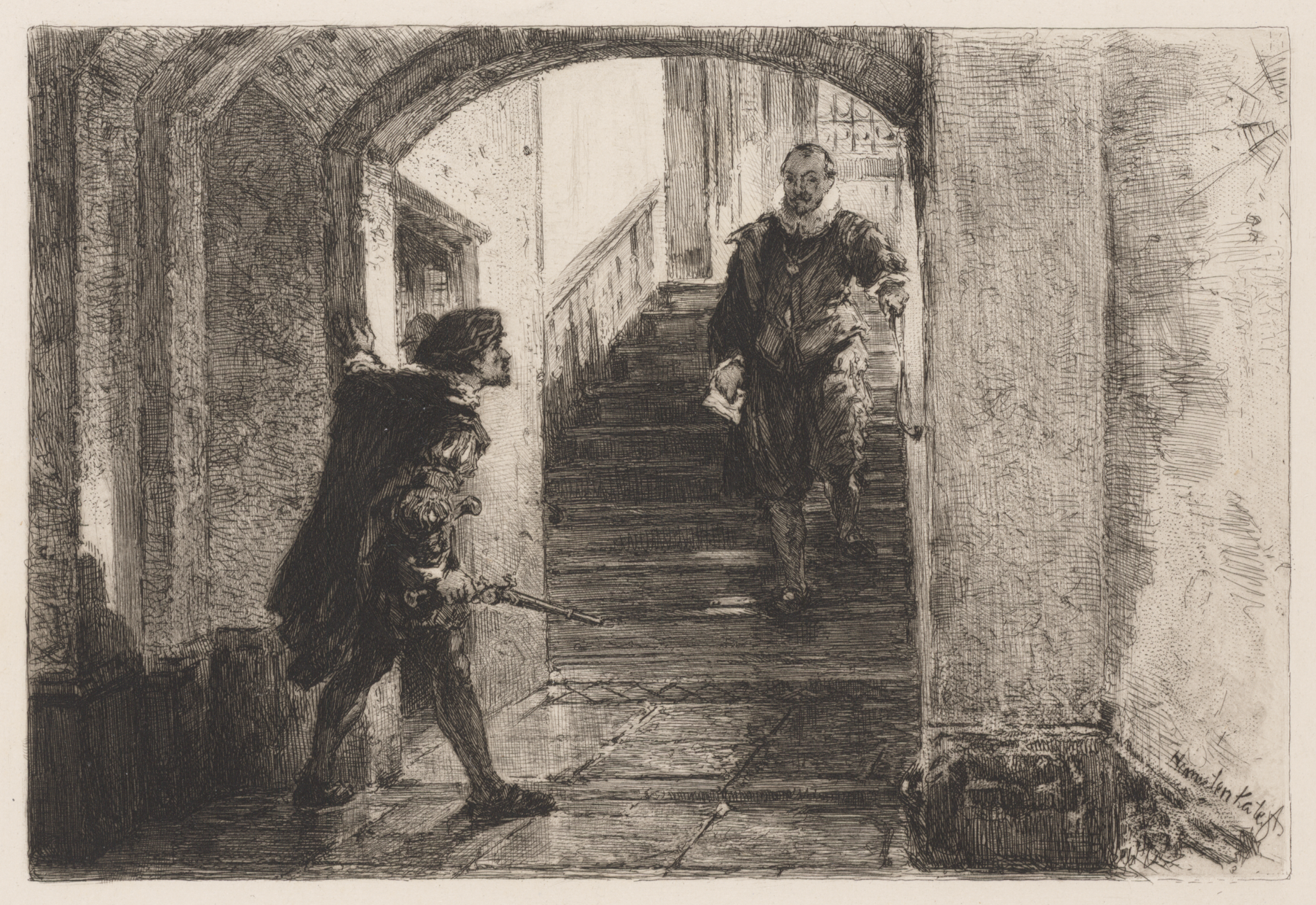
July 10: Willem van Oranje, leader of the Dutch Republic, is assassinated by gunman

1584 (MDLXXXIV) was a leap year starting on Sunday of the Gregorian calendar and a leap year starting on Wednesday of the Julian calendar, the 1584th year of the Common Era (CE) and Anno Domini (AD) designations, the 584th year of the 2nd millennium, the 84th year of the 16th century, and the 5th year of the 1580s decade. As of the start of 1584, the Gregorian calendar was 10 days ahead of the Julian calendar, which remained in localized use until 1923.

== Events ==
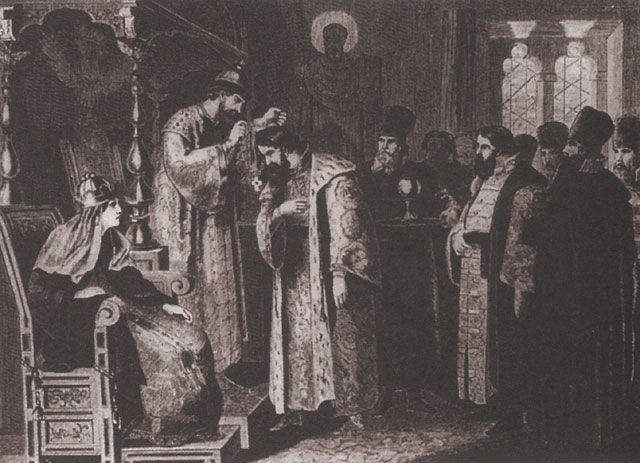
March 18: Feodor I becomes the new Tsar of Russia.

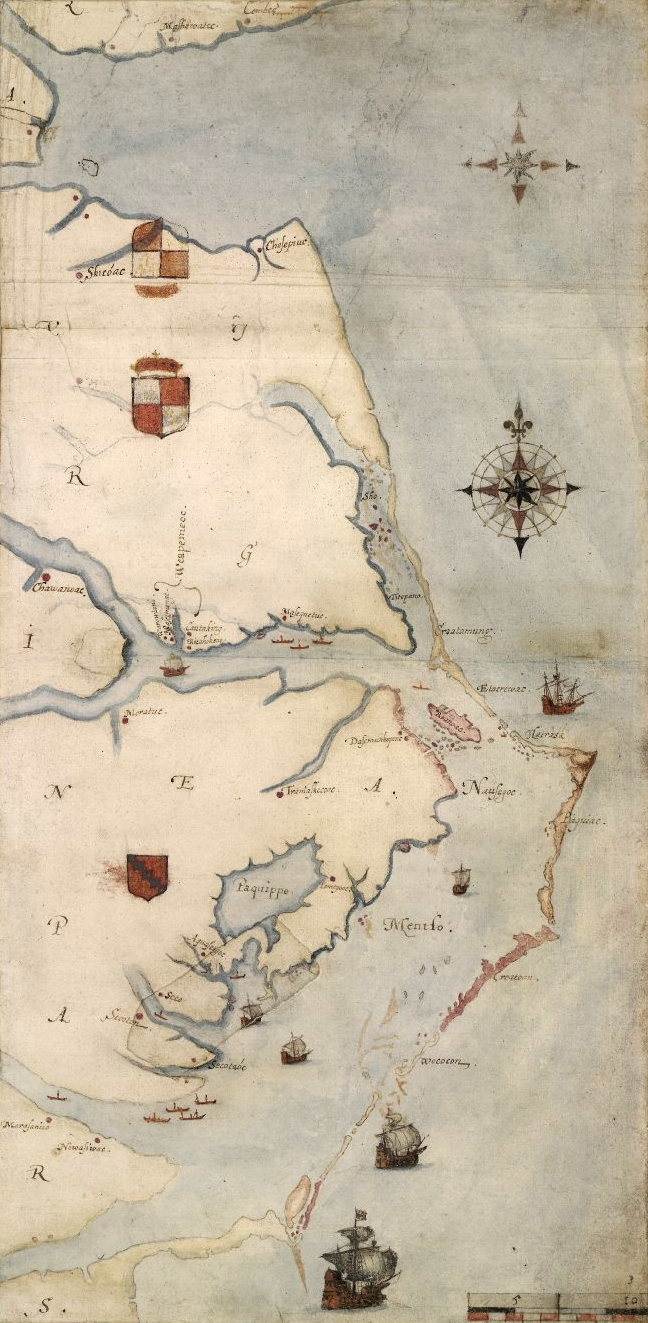
June 4: Roanoke Island is discovered by English settlers.

=== January–March ===
- January 11 – Sir Walter Mildmay is given a royal licence to found Emmanuel College, Cambridge in England.
- January 16 – Roman Catholic priest George Haydock, imprisoned in the Tower of London since 1582, states during an interrogation that he claimed that Queen Elizabeth, leader of the Church of England, was a heretic. Convicted of treason, he is executed on February 12.
- February 2 (6th waning moon of the Magha, BE 2126) – In modern-day Thailand, Prince Naresuan, the Uparaja of the Ayutthaya Kingdom and the son of King Mahathammarachathirat carries out the orders of Burma's King Nanda Bayin, and leads an army to suppress a rebellion by the Viceroy of the Ava Kingdom, Thado Minsaw. Arriving in April, Naresuan learns that King Nanda has ordered Naresuan to be assassinated, and begins his own rebellion against Burma, the Burmese–Siamese War.
- February 22 – After being falsely accused of various charges, Jeremias II Tranos, leader of the Eastern Orthodox Church as Ecumenical Patriarch of Constantinople, is deposed by his fellow bishops and exiled to the island of Rhodes. Jeremias is replaced by Pachomius II Patestos.
- February 27 – Merton Speiss opens a paper mill near Dassel in Saxony, origin of the Hahnemühle art paper manufacturing company, which will still exist in the 21st century.
- March 5 – The city of Karlstad in Sweden is granted city status by Duke Charles.
- March 28 (O.S. March 18) – Ivan the Terrible, ruler of Russia since 1533, dies; he is succeeded as Tsar by his son, Feodor.

=== April–June ===
- April 24 (1st waning of Kason 946 ME) – In modern-day Myanmar, Prince Naresuan of the Ayutthaya Kingdom (modern Thailand) suppresses the rebellion of Thado Minsaw of the Ava Kingdom.
- April 28 (Tenshō 12, 18th day of the 3rd month) – In Japan, the Battle of Komaki begins as fight between Toyotomi Hideyoshi and Tokugawa Ieyasu when Ieyasu, commander of 100,000 men, begins the occupation of the Komakiyama Castle, prompting Hideyoshi to advance from Osaka with 30,000 troops.
- May 17 (Tenshō 12, 8th day of the 4th month) – The conflict between Toyotomi Hideyoshi and Tokugawa Ieyasu culminates in the Battle of Nagakute.
- June 1 – With the death of the Duc d'Anjou, the Huguenot Henry of Navarre becomes heir-presumptive to the throne of France.
- June 4 – Walter Raleigh sends Philip Amadas and Arthur Barlowe to explore the Outer Banks of Virginia (modern-day North Carolina), with a view to establishing an English colony; they locate Roanoke Island.
- June 11 – Walk (modern-day Valka and Valga, towns in Latvia and Estonia respectively), receives city rights from Polish king Stefan Bathory.

=== July–September ===
- July 3 – The Siege of Antwerp by the Spanish Army begins and lasts for 13 months until the city's surrender on August 17, 1585.
- July 5 – The Maronite College is established in Rome.
- July 10 – William the Silent, the leader of the Dutch Republic as Stadtholder of Holland, is assassinated in Delft. Balthasar Gérard, who has bought two wheel-lock pistols with money donated by the Prince and then made an appointment at the Prinsenhof, shoots William in the chest at close range and fatally wounds him, making William the first head of state to be assassinated with a handgun.
- August 6 – Russian conquest of Siberia: Russian General Yermak Timofeyevich, who had been dispatched by Ivan the Terrible in 1582 to conquer the Khanate of Sibir, is killed along with all but one member of his invading force in an ambush commanded by Kuchum Khan, the ruler of Siberia.
- August 7 – In Lima in the Viceroyalty of Peru, Italian printer Antonio Ricardo receives official permission to set up the first printing press in South America, and prints the first publication there, Pragmatica, a four-page outline of how the new Gregorian calendar (adopted 1582) works.
- August 11 (Tenshō 12, 16th day of the 7th month) – The Tenshō embassy, Japan's first diplomatic mission to Europe, arrives in Portugal with four teenagers — Julião Nakaura, Mancio Itō, Martinho Hara and Miguel Chijiwa — who have become converts to Christianity.
- September 17 – In modern-day Belgium, the Calvinist Republic of Ghent comes to an end after seven years when its capital, Ghent, falls following a siege of 13 months. Jan van Hembyze, leader of the republic since October 1583, surrenders the city to Alexander Farnese, Governor of the Spanish Netherlands.

=== October–December ===
- October 26 – At the Battle of Slunj in the Kingdom of Croatia, an Ottoman invasion led by Ferhad Pasha Sokolović is turned back by Croatian forces, aided by troops of the Habsburg monarchy.
- November 23 – In the wake of the Throckmorton Plot to overthrow her government, Queen Elizabeth convenes the first new session of the English House of Commons since 1581. John Puckering is appointed by her as the Speaker of the House, which has 460 members. The parliament passes the Safety of the Queen Act and the Jesuits Act (which in effect will exile priests from England).
- November 24 – Albert Fontenay sends an enciphered letter to Mary, Queen of Scots that will become the chief evidence against her in her trial for treason during the Babington Plot. After becoming a witness for the English government in return for immunity from prosecution, Jérôme Pasquier will decipher the letter in 1586, leading to Mary's conviction for an attempt to assassinate Queen Elizabeth and to overthrow the English government.
- December 31 – The Treaty of Joinville is signed secretly between the French Catholic League and the Spanish citizens .

=== Date unknown ===
- Ratu Hijau becomes queen regnant of the Malay Patani Kingdom.
- Tsar Ivan orders establishment of New Kholmogory, which becomes the city of Arkhangelsk in the Russian Empire.
- Flemish cartographer and geographer Abraham Ortelius features Ming dynasty-era Chinese carriages with masts and sails, in his atlas Theatrum Orbis Terrarum; concurrent and later Western writers also take note of this peculiar Chinese invention.
- This year, according to Italian heretic Jacopo Brocardo, is regarded as an apocalyptic inauguration of a major new cycle.

== Births ==
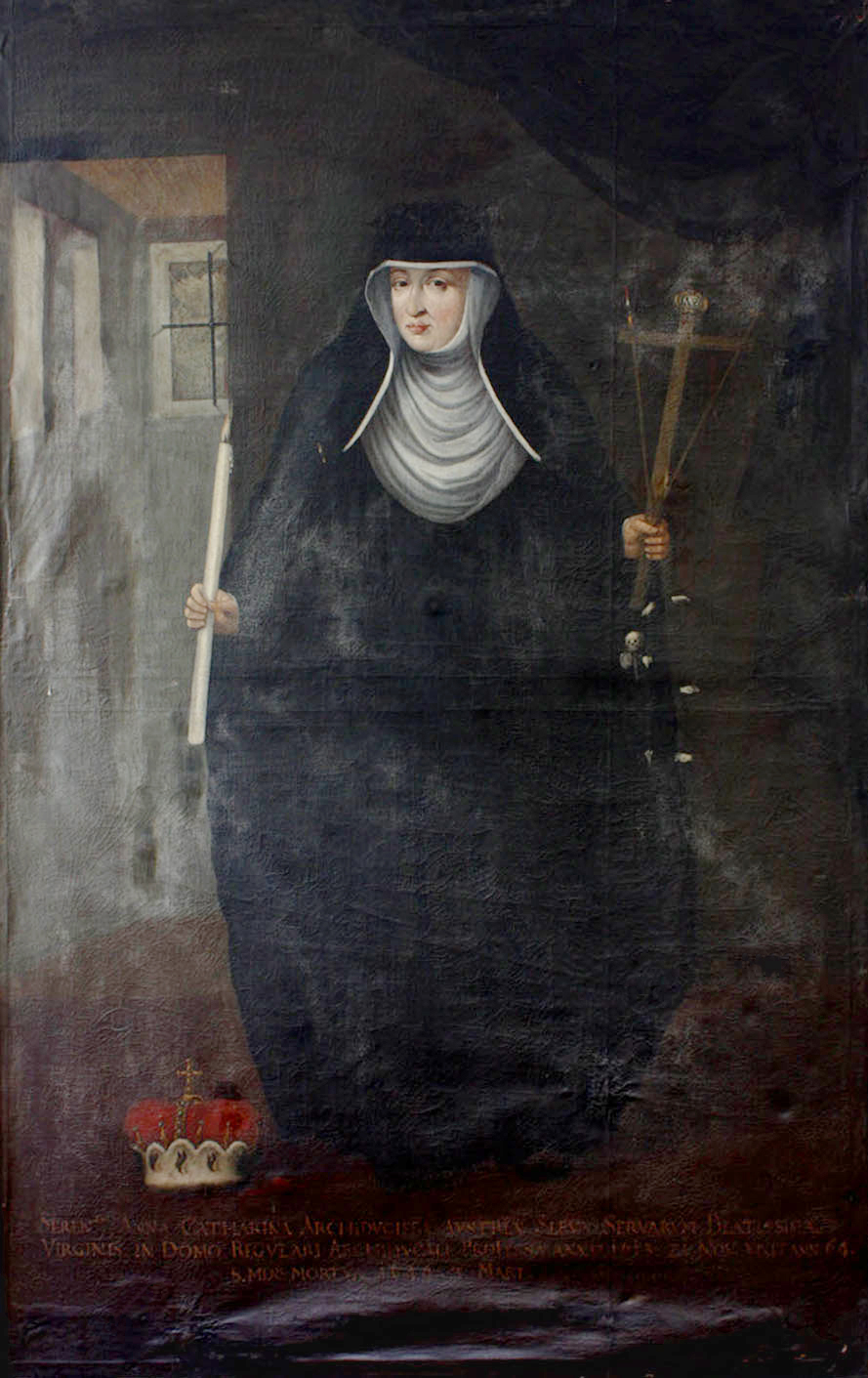
Archduchess Maria of Austria

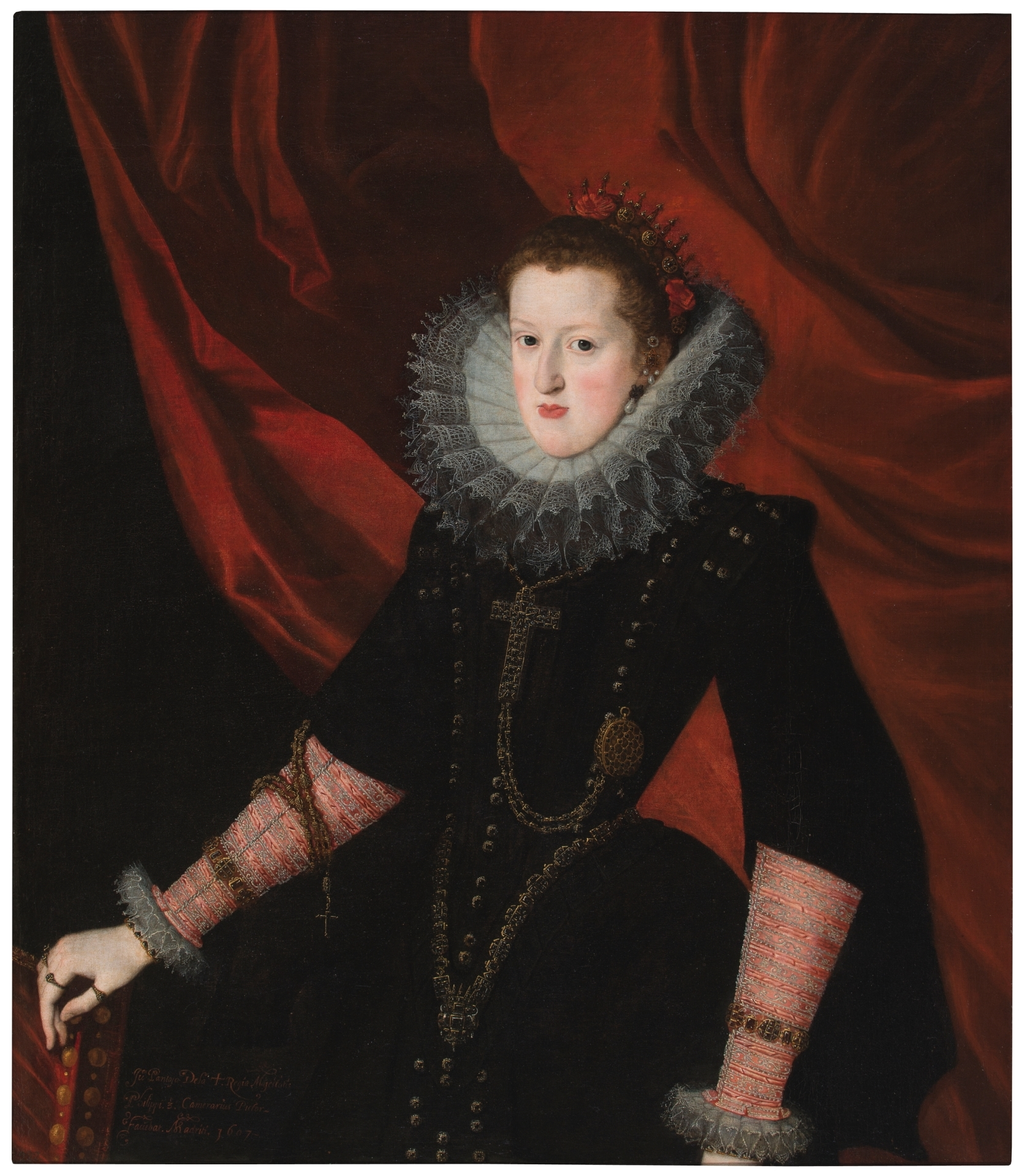
Margaret of Austria, Queen of Spain

- January 1 – Charles Delorme, French physician and the royal doctor for Kings Henri IV, Louis XIII and Louis XIV (d. 1678)
- January 7 – Karan Singh II, Maharana of Mewar (d. 1628)
- January 29 – Frederick Henry, Prince of Orange (d. 1647)
- February 9 – Francesco Maria Richini, Italian architect (d. 1658)
- February 12 – Caspar Barlaeus, Dutch polymath (d. 1648)
- February 18 – Philippe de Carteret II, governor of Jersey (d. 1643)
- February 19 – Angelo Nardi, Italian painter (d. 1664)
- February 26 – Albert VI of Bavaria (d. 1666)
- March 15 – Philip, Duke of Schleswig-Holstein-Sonderburg-Glücksburg (d. 1663)
- March 22 – Grégoire de Saint-Vincent, Flemish Jesuit mathematician (d. 1667)
- March 26 – John II, Count Palatine of Zweibrücken (d. 1635)
- March 29 – Ferdinando Fairfax, 2nd Lord Fairfax of Cameron, English parliamentary general (d. 1648)
- April 6 – Bridget de Vere, Countess of Berkshire, English noblewoman (d. 1630)
- April 10 – Sibylle Elisabeth of Württemberg, Duchess consort of Saxony (d. 1606)
- April 19 – John Hales, English theologian (d. 1656)
- April 20 – Sir John Langham, 1st Baronet, English Member of Parliament (d. 1671)
- April 23 – Jorge de Cárdenas y Manrique de Lara, Spanish noble (d. 1644)
- April 29 – Melchior Teschner, German cantor, composer and theologian (d. 1635)
- May 17 – John Jacob Hess, Swiss Anabaptist minister and martyr (d. 1639)
- May 23 – Maximilian von und zu Trauttmansdorff, Austrian diplomat (d. 1650)
- May 27 – Michael Altenburg, German composer (d. 1640)
- June 6 – Yuan Chonghuan, Chinese politician, military general and writer (d. 1630)
- June 15 – Anna Sophie of Anhalt, German noblewoman (d. 1652)
- June 16 – Archduchess Maria of Austria (d. 1649)
- June 25 – Richard Strode, English politician (d. 1669)
- June 26 – Robert Cholmondeley, 1st Earl of Leinster, English politician (d. 1659)
- July 17 – Agnes of Brandenburg, Duchess of Pomerania, later Duchess of Saxe-Lauenburg (d. 1629)
- July 26 – Gaspard III de Coligny, Marshal of France (d. 1646)
- August 1 – Emanuel Scrope, 1st Earl of Sunderland, English statesman (d. 1630)
- August 6 – Robert Pierrepont, 1st Earl of Kingston-upon-Hull, English soldier (d. 1643)
- August 10 – John Casimir, Count of Erbach-Breuberg (1606–1627) (d. 1627)
- August 11 – Philip Ernest, Count of Hohenlohe-Langenburg (1610–1628) (d. 1628)
- August 13 – Theophilus Howard, 2nd Earl of Suffolk, English politician (d. 1640)
- August 28 – Richard Treat, American city founder (d. 1669)
- August 29 – Patrick Young, Scottish librarian (d. 1652)
- September 11 – Thomas van Erpe, Dutch Orientialist, cartographer (d. 1624)
- September 13 – Francis Julius of Saxe-Lauenburg, Prince (d. 1634)
- September 15 – Georg Rudolf Weckherlin, German poet (d. 1653)
- September 16 – Giulio Roma, Italian Catholic cardinal (d. 1652)
- September 17 – John Finch, 1st Baron Finch, English judge (d. 1660)
- October 10 – Philip Herbert, 4th Earl of Pembroke (d. 1650)
- November 3 – Jean-Pierre Camus, French Catholic bishop (d. 1652)
- November 10 – Catherine of Sweden, Countess Palatine of Kleeburg (d. 1638)
- November 16 – Barbara Sophie of Brandenburg, duchess consort and later regent of Württemberg (d. 1636)
- November 18 – Gaspar de Crayer, Flemish painter (d. 1669)
- December 15 – Queen Inmok, Korean royal consort (d. 1632)
- December 16 – John Selden, English jurist (d. 1654)
- December 25 – Margaret of Austria, Queen of Spain (d. 1611)
- December 27 – Philipp Julius, Duke of Pomerania (d. 1625)
- December 28 – Juan de Dicastillo, Spanish theologian (d. 1653)
- date unknown
  - William Baffin, English explorer (d. 1622)
  - Francis Beaumont, English dramatist (d. 1616)
  - Antonio Cifra, Italian composer (d. 1629)
  - Hu Zhengyan, Chinese artist, printmaker, calligrapher and publisher (d. 1674)
  - Miyamoto Musashi, Japanese samurai, artist, strategist, rōnin and philosopher, known for The Book of Five Rings (written 1643) (d. 1645)
  - Mathieu Molé, French statesman (d. 1656)
  - Chiara Varotari, Italian Baroque painter (d. 1663)
  - Herman Wrangel, Swedish soldier and politician (d. 1643)

== Deaths ==
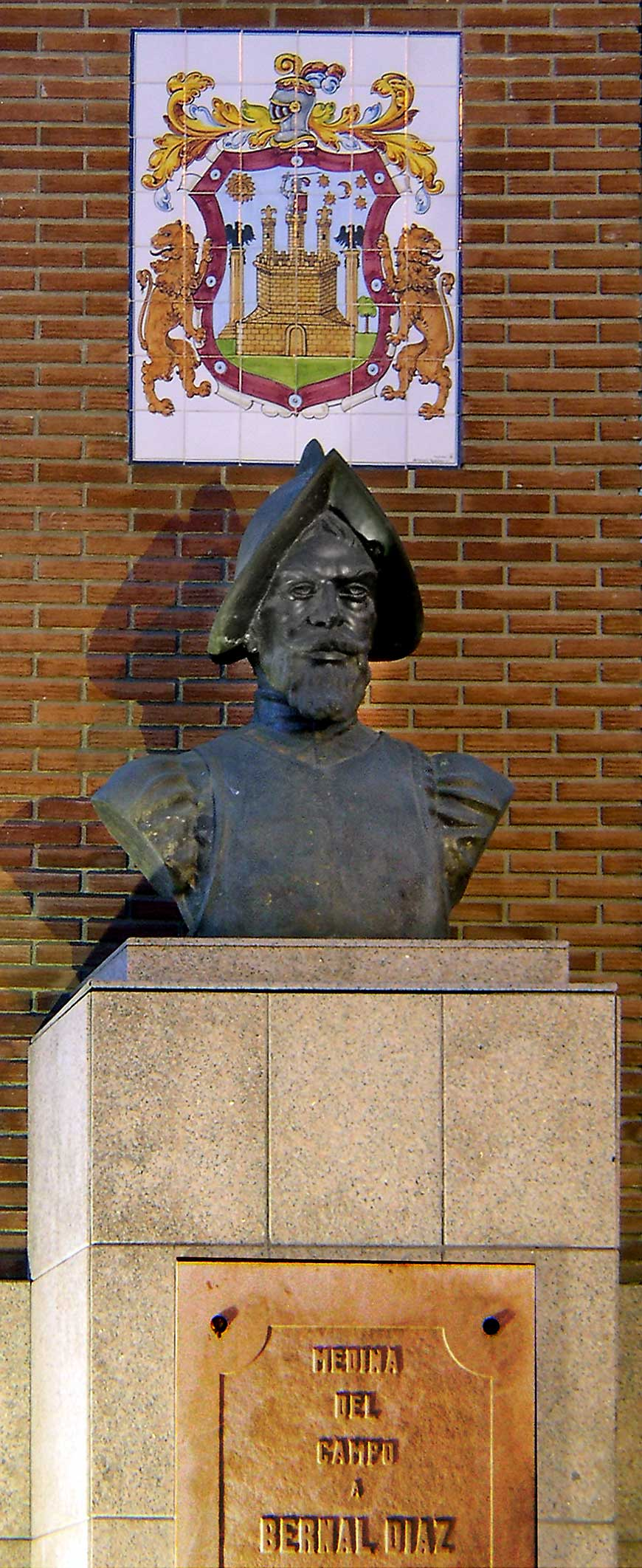
Bernal Díaz del Castillo

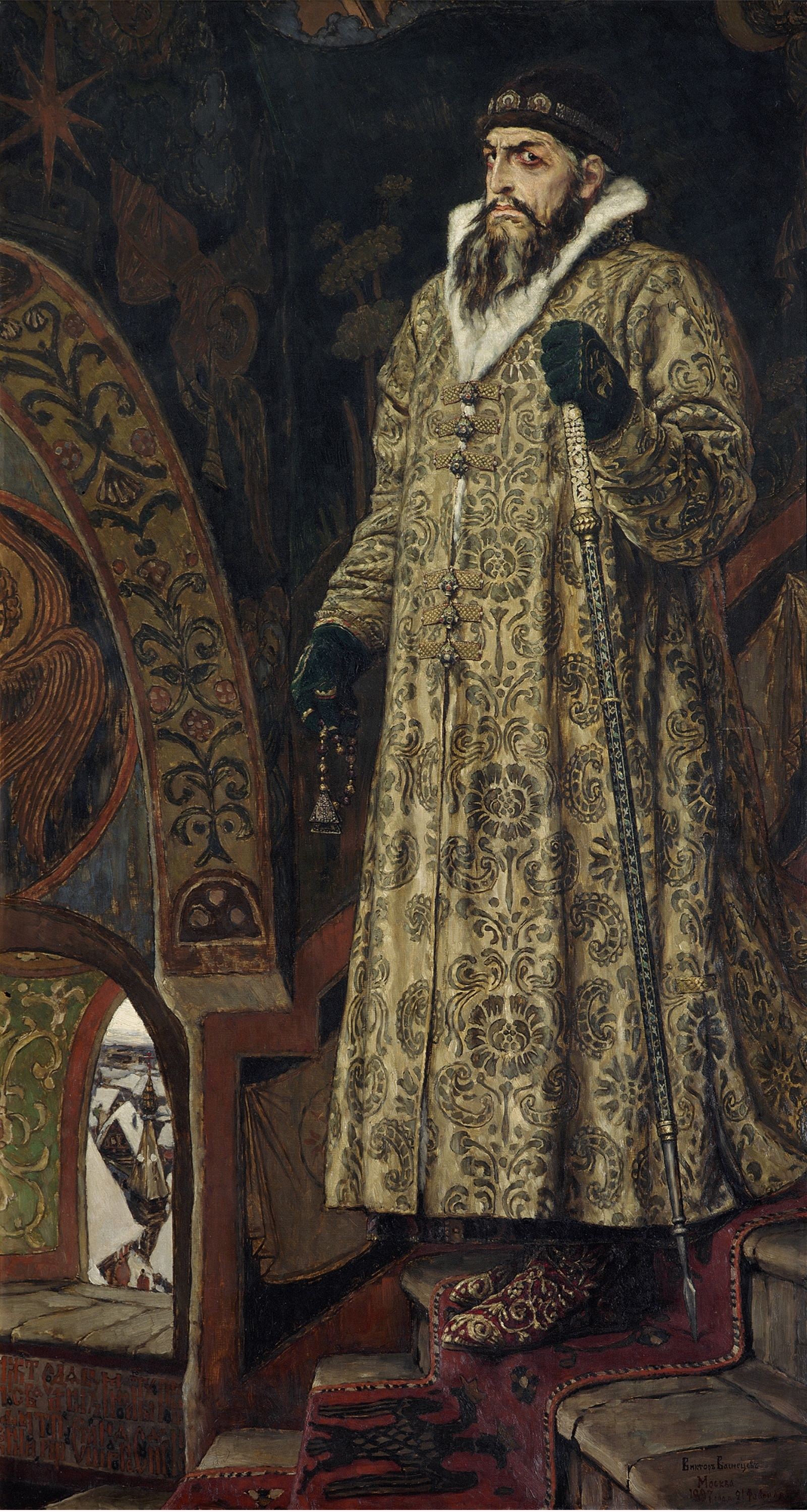
Tsar Ivan IV of Russia

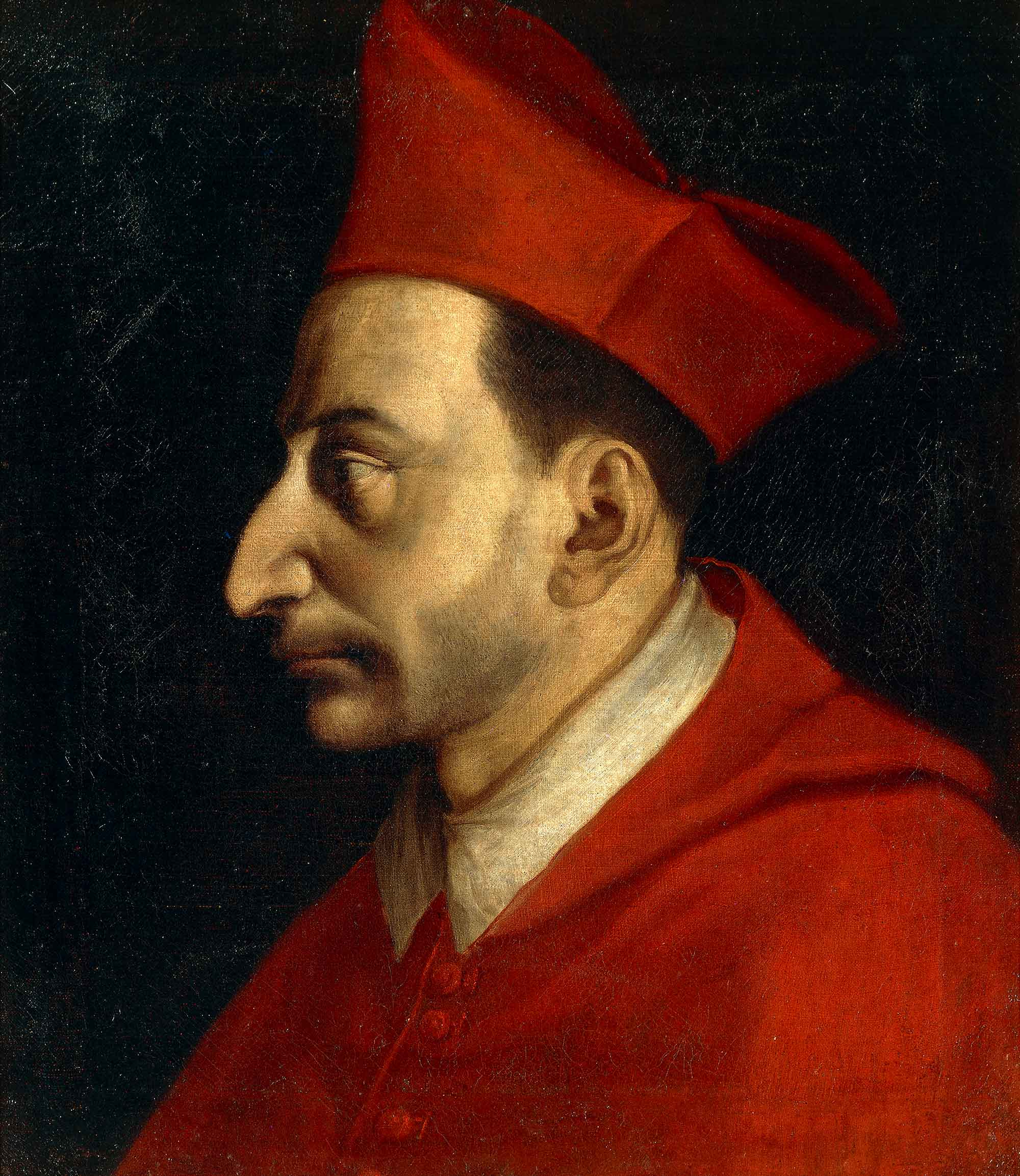
Saint Charles Borromeo

- January 4 – Tobias Stimmer, Swiss painter and drawer (b. 1539)
- January 11 – Bernal Díaz del Castillo, Spanish constiquador (b. 1496)
- January 15 – Martha Leijonhufvud, politically active Swedish noble (b. 1520)
- February 18 – Antonio Francesco Grazzini, Italian writer (b. 1503)
- February 19 – Anna de' Medici, Tuscan princess (b. 1569)
- February 27 – Yi I of Joseon, Korean Confucian scholar (b. 1536)
- March 10 – Thomas Norton, English politician and writer (b. 1532)
- March 18 – Tsar Ivan IV of Russia (b. 1530)
- May 10 – Luigi Cornaro, Italian Catholic cardinal (b. 1517)
- March 12 – Kasper Franck, German theologian (b. 1543)
- April 13 – Jan Borukowski, royal secretary of Poland (b. 1524)
- April 27 – Mikołaj "the Red" Radziwiłł, Polish magnate (b. 1512)
- May 18 – Ikeda Tsuneoki, Japanese daimyō and military commander (in battle) (b. 1536)
- May 25 – Prospero Spani, Italian sculptor (b. 1516)
- June 10 – François, Duke of Anjou (b. 1555)
- June 13 – János Zsámboky, Hungarian scholar (b. 1531)
- July 10
  - Francis Throckmorton, conspirator against Queen Elizabeth I of England (executed; b. 1554)
  - William the Silent, Prince of Orange (assassinated; b. 1533)
- July 12 – Steven Borough, English explorer (b. 1525)
- July 14 – Balthasar Gérard, French assassin of William the Silent (executed; b. 1557)
- July 23 – John Day, English Protestant printer (b. 1522)
- August 12 – Carolus Sigonius, Italian humanist (b. 1524)
- August 22 – Jan Kochanowski, Polish writer (b. 1530)
- October – Colin Campbell, 6th Earl of Argyll, Scottish noble and politician (b. 1541)
- October 17 – Richard Gwyn, Welsh Catholic martyr, canonised
- November 3 – Charles Borromeo, Italian Roman Catholic cardinal, canonised (b. 1538)
- November 17 – Eric II, Duke of Brunswick-Lüneburg (b. 1528)
- December 26 – Giovanni Francesco Commendone, Italian Catholic cardinal (b. 1523)
- date unknown
  - Elena Anguissola, Italian painter and nun (b. c. 1532)
  - Michał Wiśniowiecki, Polish–Lithuanian noble (b. 1529)
