= List of protected heritage sites in Flémalle =

This table shows an overview of the protected heritage sites in the Walloon town Flémalle. This list is part of Belgium's national heritage.

Object	Year/architect	Town/section	Address	Coordinates	Number^{?}	Image
Organs of the church Saint-Mathias ^{(nl)} ^{(fr)}		Flémalle		50.600354°N 5.466474°E	62120-CLT-0002-01 Info	
Castle Aigremont with surrounding land ^{(nl)} ^{(fr)}		Flémalle		50.590910°N 5.414974°E	62120-CLT-0003-01 Info	Kasteel van Aigremont, ensemble van kasteel met omliggend terrein
Extension of Castle site Aigremont ^{(nl)} ^{(fr)}		Flémalle		50.590625°N 5.413065°E	62120-CLT-0004-01 Info	
Corner pavilions of the gardens, a chapel, outbuildings, farm on the estate and the surrounding walls and iron work ^{(nl)} ^{(fr)}		Flémalle		50.591009°N 5.414547°E	62120-CLT-0005-01 Info	Hoekpaviljoens van de tuinen, een kapel, bijgebouwen, boerderij op het domein en de omringende muren en ijzerwerk
Schmerling caves ^{(nl)} ^{(fr)}		Flémalle		50.592145°N 5.407560°E	62120-CLT-0006-01 Info	Grotten Schmerling
Haultepenne site: area of special value ^{(nl)} ^{(fr)}		Flémalle		50.608529°N 5.394925°E	62120-CLT-0007-01 Info	Site van Hautepenne: gebied van bijzondere waarde
Chokier Castle with the park, the farm and surrounding areas ^{(nl)} ^{(fr)}		Flémalle		50.590245°N 5.437312°E	62120-CLT-0008-01 Info	Kasteel van Chokier: gevels en daken, en ensemble van het kasteel, het park, de boerderij en de omliggende terreinen
Werixhet ^{(nl)} ^{(fr)}		Flémalle		50.589504°N 5.439346°E	62120-CLT-0009-01 Info	
Ramet castle and outbuildings ^{(nl)} ^{(fr)}		Flémalle		50.583512°N 5.447161°E	62120-CLT-0010-01 Info	Kasteel van Ramet en bijgebouwen: gevels en daken
Haultepenne Castle: walls and roofs, and the retaining wall, the railing of the terrace and the rim of the basin in stone ^{(nl)} ^{(fr)}		Flémalle		50.608515°N 5.401514°E	62120-CLT-0011-01 Info	Kasteel Haultepenne: gevels en daken, en de keermuur, de reling van het terras en de rand van het bassin in steen
Châtaigneraie Castle and its surroundings ^{(nl)} ^{(fr)}		Flémalle		50.583793°N 5.440228°E	62120-CLT-0012-01 Info	
Ramioul cave ^{(nl)} ^{(fr)}		Flémalle		50.577376°N 5.425060°E	62120-CLT-0013-01 Info	
Church Saint-Marcellin ^{(nl)} ^{(fr)}		Flémalle		50.590508°N 5.442844°E	62120-CLT-0014-01 Info	Kerk Saint-Marcellin: al het meubilair gebouw bij de ingang aan en onderbroken door vier pijlers met raster
Church Saint-Lambert ^{(nl)} ^{(fr)}		Flémalle		50.609315°N 5.396161°E	62120-CLT-0015-01 Info	Kerk Saint-Lambert: interieur, exterieur en meubilair
Schmerling caves ^{(fr)}		Flémalle		50.592145°N 5.407560°E	62120-PEX-0001-01 Info	

== See also ==
- List of protected heritage sites in Liège (province)
