= Capture of Breda (1581) =

1581 battle during the Eighty Years' War

Coordinates: 51°34′N 4°48′E

The Capture of Breda of 1581, also known as the Haultepenne Fury, occurred on 26–27 July when Spanish troops under the command of Claude de Berlaymont, lord of Haultepenne, took Breda by surprise after a sentry was bribed by a follower of the king, Charles de Gavre, who was kept a prisoner at the castle. The corrupt sentry allowed the Spanish troops to enter the castle.

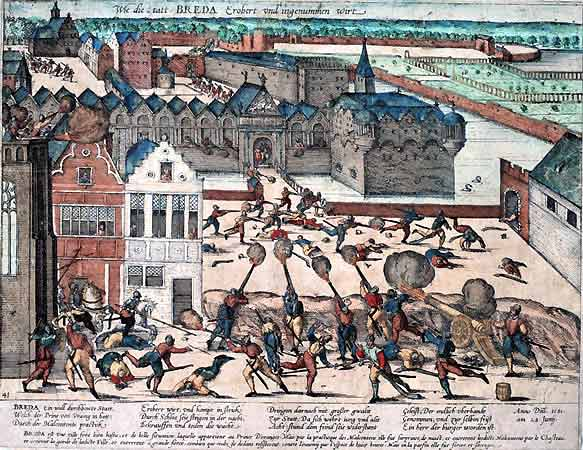
Berleymont's army overwhelms the defenses of Breda after bribing a sentry, and sacks the city.

Despite the resistance by Breda's citizens, the attackers succeeded in taking the most important city gates and launched an attack on the city hall, the tower, and the church. The defenders surrendered on the condition that the city would not be looted. At 10.00 a.m. fighting stopped and the sack and massacre started. Some 584 citizens died during this relatively short event.
