= Jacques de Bela =

Jacques de Bela (15 February 1586 – 28 May 1667) was a French-basque lawyer and writer in basque language, born at Mauléon. Among his works, he wrote Dictionnaire Basque and Compendium de grammaire Basque.

== Life ==
At age 20 he obtained a doctorate in law from the University of Toulouse. Being Calvinist he suffered great difficulties to register between the lawyers of the Court of Mauleon. He was admitted in 1614, but spent 17 years before obtaining the position of dance and Royal judge. Miserable in her marriage to Jeanne d'Arbide who was Catholic intransigent, sought refuge in his deeply religious spirit. Its currency, adopted later by the Bela family, was: is hala, "Jadis, comme cela", Orain hula, "Aujourd'hui ' hui comme ceci", Guero, ez dakit nola, "Plus tard, je ne sais comment". With a special mood and a difficult character, initially not sought in the Studio rather than a form of entertainment, but soon driven by his passion for writing, he composed a dictionary and a Basque grammar, that has been lost. Later, he made two huge manuscripts: the first, comprising 6 volumes. The fourth, is a kind of encyclopedia, known as Tablettes, containing, in alphabetical order, theological, moral, medical, and scientific matters; the second, eighth and with more than 600 pages, says the charters of the country of the Soule. Regardless of these writings, it has some works of law. Despite its incorrect and sometimes diffuse language should recognize his vast knowledge. G. Clément-Simon in his work Le Hélène l'érudition et dans Le Pays Basque au commencement du XVIIe siécle (1896), picks up a few proverbs and Basque sayings taken from the unpublished works of Bela and inserts in the biography that this character brings the author. Bela died on May 28, 1667. Among the descendants of Jacques is the Jeanne-Philippe Bela Knight, His great-grandson was Jean-Philippe Bela, known as chevalier de Bela.

== Bibliography ==
- Nichols, John: The Gentleman's magazine: Vol. 290-291 (1967).
- Mitxelena, Luis: selected writings of a Basque scholar (Center for Basque Studies, University of Nevada) (2008)
