= Haultepenne Castle =

Belgian castle

Coordinates: 50°36′33.84″N 5°23′59.17″E

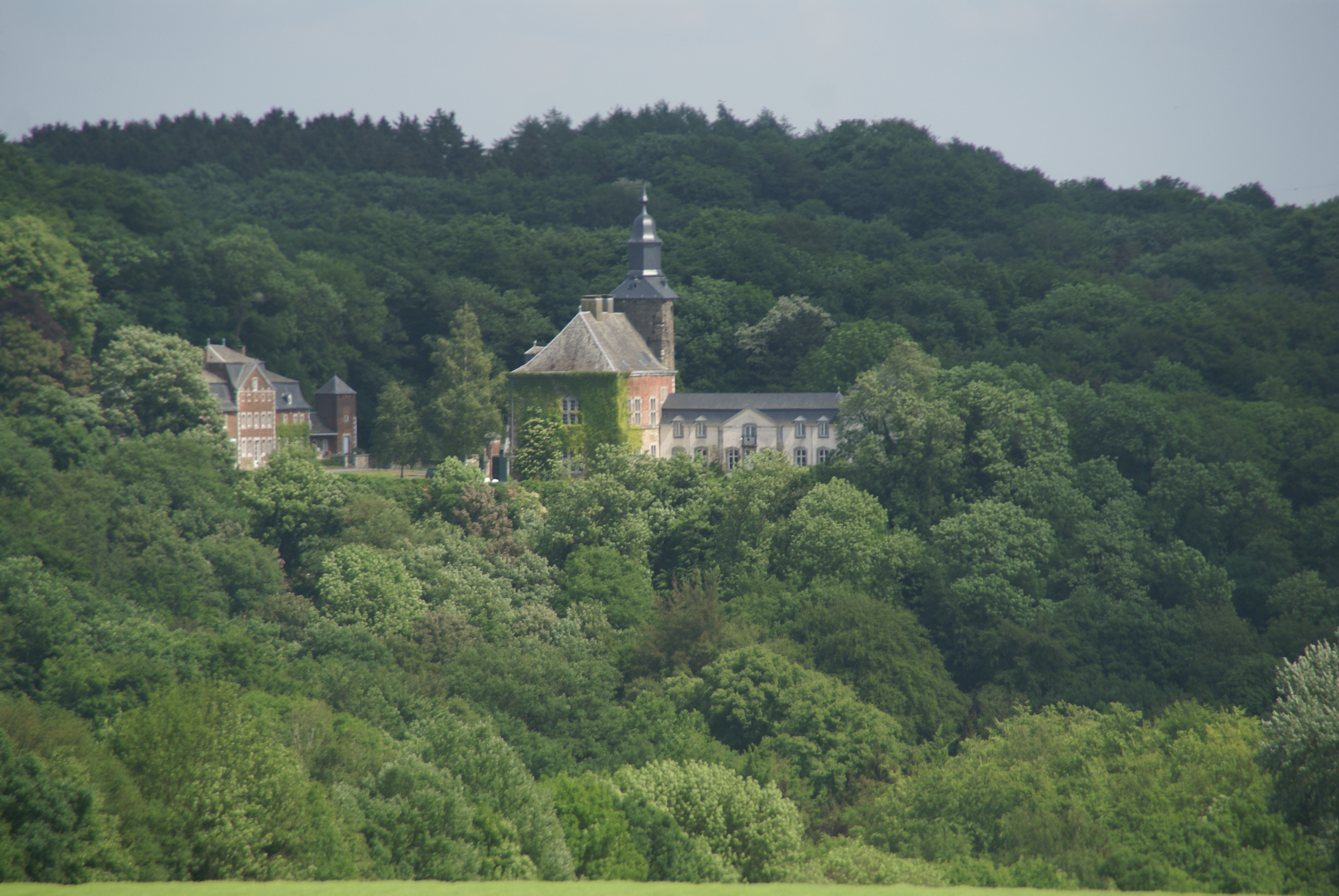
Haultepenne Castle

Haultepenne Castle, also spelled Hautepenne Castle (French: Château de Hautepenne), is a part medieval, part Renaissance structure located in the village of Gleixhe in the municipality of Flémalle in Wallonia, Belgium. It is known for its red brick and uniquely shaped tower.

For several centuries, the castle was in the possession of a Flemish noble family, Berlaymont. The name of the castle is bound to the sobriquet, the Fury of Haultepenne, when the army of Claude de Berlaymont (1550–1587) overran the Breda following a siege in 1581. The city surrendered on the condition that it would not be sacked, and when the fighting stopped, the soldiers were turned loose. Over 500 residents died.

== See also ==
- List of castles in Belgium
