= Hans Jacob Hess =

Anabaptist minister and martyr

Reverend John Jacob Hess
- Born: 17 May 1584; Wald, Zurich, Switzerland
- Died: 1639 (age 55); Othenbach Prison, Switzerland
- Other names: Hans Jacob Hess, Jakob Kuntz Hess
- Occupation: Minister
- Known for: Anabaptist martyr

John Jacob Hess (German: Hans Jacob Hess) (17 May 1584 – 1639) was a Swiss-German Anabaptist minister and martyr.

== Early life ==
John Jacob Hess was born in Wald, Zurich, Switzerland on 17 May 1584 to Hans Heinrich Hess, a bailiff, (1534–1587) and Adelheid Kuntz (1546–1585). He had eight older full siblings: Margaretha, Christian, Matheus, Hans, Elsy, Margaretha, Heinrich, and Dorothea; five older half-siblings from his father's first two marriages: Adelheid, Barbara, Veronica, Catharina and Anna; and one younger half-brother, Hans, from his father's fourth marriage.

== Marriage and children ==
He married Anna Egli (1584–1639) on 27 April 1606. They had 7 children: Anna (b: September 1607), Christian (b. 15 February 1609), Heinrich (b. 28 January 1615), Hans Egli (b. 24 May 1617), Samuel (b. 28 August 1621), Veronica (b. 10 February 1623) and Dorothea (b. 7 October 1627).

== Imprisonment and death ==
In 1637, he was arrested for being Anabaptist, and locked in Othenbach Prison for 19 days. Later that year, he was again arrested, this time spending eight weeks in Othenbach Prison. In 1638, he was arrested for the third and final time, and thrown in Othenbach Prison for 83 weeks. While imprisoned, he was stripped and put in iron bonds for 16 weeks. He, along with his wife, who was imprisoned for 63 weeks, contracted tuberculosis (then known as consumption), and died. His property was seized and sold for 4,000 guilders (approximately $800,000 in modern US dollars). None of the money was restored to his descendants.
