= Battle of Arronches =

1653 battle

- Part of Portuguese Restoration War
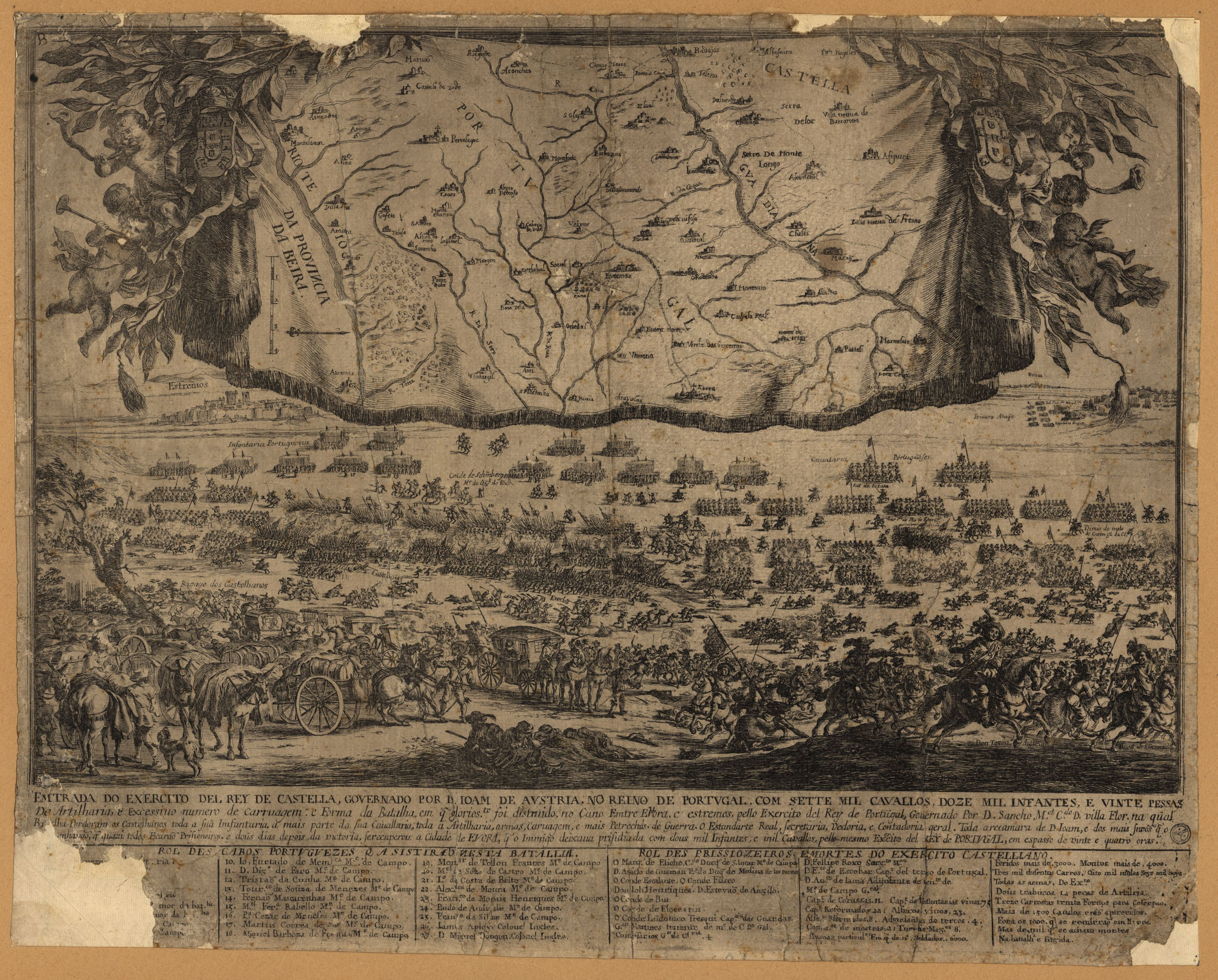
- 17th-century Portuguese engraving depicting the Battle of Ameixial, one of the battles of the War
Date	8 November 1653
Location	Near Arronches, Portugal
Result	Portuguese victory

Belligerents
Portugal	Spain

Commanders and leaders
André de Albuquerque Ribafria	Unknown

Strength
950 men	1,300 men

Casualties and losses
Low	Very high

The Battle of Arronches was an encounter between the forces of the Portuguese Empire and of the Spanish Empire in 1653, near Arronches, Alentejo. The Portuguese, significantly outnumbered, managed to outflank the Spanish forces and defeat them badly.
