= Juan Bautista de Lezana =

Juan Bautista de Lezana (23 November 1586 – 29 March 1659) was a Spanish Carmelite theologian. Lezana was an authority on canon law, dogmatic theology, and philosophy; his historical works are not of the same standard.

== Life ==
Lezana was born at Madrid. He took the habit at Alberca, in Old Castile, on 18 October 1600, and made his profession at the house of the Carmelites of the Old Observance, at Madrid, in 1602. He studied philosophy at Toledo, theology at Salamanca, partly at the college of the order, partly at the university under Juan Marquez, and finally at Alcalá under Luis de Montesion.

For some years he was employed as lecturer at Toledo and Alcalá, but having been sent to the general chapter of 1625 as delegate of his province, he remained in Rome as professor of theology. At the following chapter (1645), at which he assisted in the quality of titular provincial of Palestine, he obtained some votes for the generalship, but remaining in the minority he was nominated assistant general; for some years he also filled the office of procurator general.

In addition to these dignities within the order, he filled for sixteen years the chair of metaphysics at the Sapienza and became consultor to the Congregation of the Index under Pope Urban VIII, and to that of Rites under Pope Innocent X. Appointed to a bishopric, he requested a nun to recommend an important matter (the nature of which he did not disclose) to Our Lord in prayer, and received through her the answer, which he acted upon, that it would be more perfect for him to refuse the dignity. He died in Rome.

== Works ==
His "Annals of the Carmelite Order" (four folio vols.) were published between 1645 and 1656, and there remained another volume in manuscript.

The following are his main works:

1. "Liber apologeticus pro Immaculata Conceptione" (Madrid, 1616).
2. "De regularium reformatione" (Rome, 1627), four times reprinted and translated into French, although it is doubtful whether the translation appeared in print.
3. "Summa quæstionum regularium", five vols., the first of which appeared in Rome (1637), the last in 1647, most of them were repeatedly reprinted.
4. Two works, "Columna immobilis", and "Turris Davidica", on Our Lady of the Pillar at Saragossa (1655 and 1656).
5. "Maria patrona" (Rome, 1648).
6. Life of St. Mary Magdalene de Pazzi, in Spanish (Rome, 1648).
7. "Summa theologiæ sacræ" (3 vols., Rome, 1651 sqq.).
8. "Consulta varia theologica" (Venice, 1656).

Also some less important works.
