= Claude de Berlaymont =

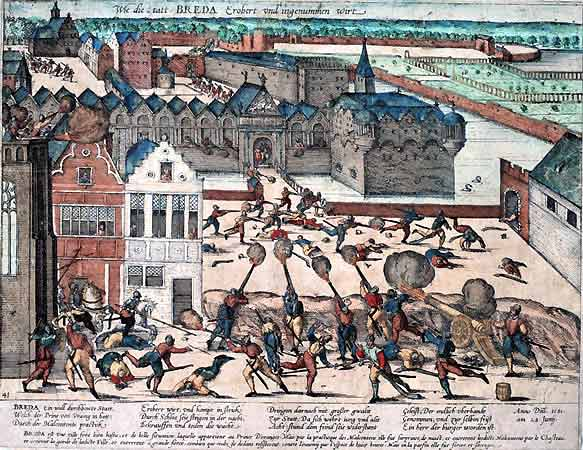
- The city of Breda is overrun and destroyed by Claude von Berlaymont's soldiers, known as Haultepenne's Fury
- Born: circa 1550
- Died: 14 July 1587 (aged 36-37) 's-Hertogenbosch
- Military career
- Service years: 1579–1587
- Nickname: Haultpenne
- Conflicts: Siege of Breda (1581) Battle of Werl (1586)

Claude de Berlaymont (or Claudius van Barlaymont), lord of Haultpenne (ca. 1550 – 14 July 1587), was a Waloon military commander in Spain's Army of Flanders during the Eighty Years' War.

== Family ==
He was the seventh and last son of count Charles de Berlaymont (1510–1578) and Adriana de Ligne Barbançon. His father was a supporter and councilor to Margaret of Parma; he is reported to have referred to the Dutch citizens requesting the Compromise of Nobles as "geuzen" (beggars), an appellation the Dutch proudly adopted.

=== Siblings ===
- Gilles of Berlaymont, count of Hierges, stadtholder of Friesland (1572–1574), Guelders (1572–1577), Groningen (1572–1574). He died in the Siege of Maastricht (1579).
- John of Berlaymont, provost of the Saint Gervais, in Maastricht, and a member of the cathedral chapter in Liege.
- Charles of Berlaymont, Knight of Malta in 1554
- Louis of Berlaymont (? – 15 February 1596), archbishop of Cambrai
- Lancelot of Berlaymont, lord of Beauraing
- Florent of Berlaymont (? – 1626), count of Berlaymont, lord of Floyon, knight of the Golden Fleece, hereditary chamberlain of Hainault, and governor of Luxembourg.
- Marie of Berlaymont
- Adrienne of Berlaymont (? – 1582), married Johann of Brandenburg

He married Adrienne de Brimeu, but left no offspring. At his death, his property and honors passed to his brother, Florent.

== Career ==
Claude was lord of Haultpenne in Flémalle, a Walloon area in the bishopric of Liege. His nickname is derived from the name of the castle, an elegant medieval and Renaissance structure. He was a member of the council of states of the Seventeen Provinces, and he was captured in 1576 with his father. Although he signed the Union of Brussels, but immediately afterwards travelled to Namur, where he joined the Spanish faction and tried to win the favour of Don John of Austria. His father died in 1578, and in 1579, his oldest brother, Gilles, killed at the Siege of Maastricht; Claude succeeded his brother as governor of Charleville.

In 1581 Haultpenne was sent to fight Dutch rebels in the eastern province of Friesland, but the capture of Steenbergen on 12 August 1583 signalled the need for his return to Brabant. In 1581 he led the Siege of Breda, also known as the Haultepenne's Fury. Breda had been in the hands of William of Orange since the Pacification of Ghent in 1576. Haultpenne managed to enter the city by bribing a sentry, after which his troops sacked and plundered it, murdering more than 500 citizens. He defended 's-Hertogenbosch, and reconquered Lier, Eindhoven, Nijmegen and Guelders, after which he became its Stadtholder from 1583–1585.

The Duke of Parma had great confidence in Haultpenne's abilities, and sent him to the Electorate of Cologne, which was rife with disorder arising out of conflicting claims by Calvinists and Catholics to the Electorate and its possessions. In the Cologne War, Berlaymount laid siege to Werl in 1586,. Although Martin Schenck von Nydeggen had a force of approximately 500 men, and Berlaymount over 4000 plus horse and cannons, Schenck succeeded in fighting his way out of the city and to safety. While at Boxtel, Haultpenne received a call for aid from 's- Hertogenbosch. On his way there, he engaged an enemy army led by Philip of Hohenlohe at a redoubt at Engelen, and was mortally wounded in the throat. He was taken to 's-Hertogenbosch, where he died on 14 July.

== Sources ==
- Royal Academy Biography
- (in Dutch) Patriots and Heroes
