= Diego de Colmenares =

Spanish historian and writer

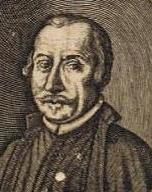
Diego de Colmenares

Diego de Colmenares (26 July 1586 – 29 January 1651) was a Spanish historian and writer. He wrote Historia de la insigne Ciudad de Segovia y compendio de las historias de Castilla.
