= Juan de Dicastillo =

Spanish Jesuit theologian

Juan de Dicastillo (28 December 1584 – 6 March 1653) was a Spanish Jesuit theologian. He was born in Naples. He entered the novitiate of the Society of Jesus in 1600, and was professor of theology for twenty-five years at Toledo, Murcia, and Vienna. He died in Ingolstadt.

== Works ==
In moral theology, Dicastillo followed the principles of probabilism. His principal works are:

- De justitia et jure ceterisque virtutibus cardinalibus libriduo (Antwerp, 1641)
- De Sacramentis in genere disputationes scholastic et morales (Antwerp, 1646–52);
- De sacramentis disputations scholastic & Morales: torus terminus, in quo gaiter de sacramento et contractu matrimonio et de sponsalibus
- Tractatus duo de juramento, perjurio, et adjuratione, necnon de censuris et poenis ecclesiasticis (Antwerp, 1662)
- Tractatus de incarnatione (Antwerp, 1642).
