= Matthias Faber =

German Jesuit priest

Matthias Faber, S.J., (24 February 1587 – 26 April 1653) was a German Jesuit priest, who gained fame as a religious writer and preacher.

== Life ==
Faber was born in Altomünster, in Bavaria. He received Holy Orders and became pastor of the Parish of St. Maurice in Ingolstadt, where he became a professor at the university of that city. He gained such a great reputation that he was appointed to serve as a Canonical Visitor to examine the Prince-bishopric of Eichstätt. His sermons had already won for him a reputation as a sacred orator when he entered the Society of Jesus at Vienna in 1637. He was then already fifty years old.

Faber joined the faculty of the Jesuit university in Tyrnau (which became the University of Budapest), then in the Kingdom of Hungary, now Trnava in Slovakia. It was there that he died in 1653.

== Works ==
Faber published a three-volume collection of his sermons in 1631, entitled Concionum opus tripartitum pluribus in singula Evangelia argumentis instructum, providing ten sermons for every Sunday of the year. It was reprinted several times, both in Germany and in the Netherlands, over the next twenty years. The sermons which Faber has left are remarkable for the clarity of their Catholic doctrine and learning. He is even more a controversialist than orator in the ordinary sense of the word. The goal of his preaching was, before everything, polemical, either to convert non-Catholics or to safeguard Catholics from the Protestant Reformation.

According to the custom of the times, Faber made exhaustive use of Scriptural texts, which overwhelm his instructive sermons and render the reading of them difficult. They are all written in Latin, and have been published in many editions.

After his admission to the Jesuits, Faber continued his sermon writing and in 1646 published another volume of sermons, this one for all Sundays and major feast days of the day. The work, entitled Auctarium operis concionum tripartiti, is divided into two parts, and was published in combination with his earlier work. The Concionum opus tripartitum, combined with the Auctarium, contain one thousand and ninety-six sermons. Besides these, he preached sermons at funerals and weddings, which were published after his death.

In Faber's one of the sermons in his published collection, he treated the topic of "curiosity", a popular one in that period. It was one of eight sermons he provided for the Feast of St. John the Evangelist, reflecting on the Gospel passage of John 21:22. He divided curiosity into five directions, based upon the object of the curiosity. These sermons were referred to approvingly by Lutheran writers as late as 1690.
