= Destruction of the Oberstift =

- Part of The Cologne War
- Several dozen small towns and fortified farms and villages south of Bruhl were plundered and burned.
| Date | late December 1582 – June 1583 |
| Location | Electorate of Cologne 50°41′0″N 7°8′0″E |
| Result | no winners |

Belligerents
| Gebhard Truchsess von Waldburg, Prince-Elector, Cologne 1578-1588; House of Neuenahr-Alpen; House of Waldburg | Ernst of Bavaria Prince-Elector, Cologne, 1583-1612; House of Wittelsbach; House of Isenburg-Grenzau; House of Mansfeld (main line) |

Commanders and leaders
| Karl, Truchsess von Waldburg | Ferdinand of Bavaria |

Casualties and losses
| Unknown | Unknown |

The destruction of the Oberstift, which included Linz, Ahrweiler, and other small towns and villages, occurred in the opening months of the Cologne War, from Christmas Day, 1582 until the end of March, 1583. Over these few weeks, armies of the competing archbishops of Cologne burned the southernmost villages, cloisters, and small towns.

In the Cologne War (1583–1589) two men competed for control of the Electorate of Cologne and sought to control one of the wealthiest Electorates in the Holy Roman Empire. Their contest lasted until 1589, when Gebhard Truchsess von Waldburg renounced his claim and moved to Strassbourg; Ernst of Bavaria became uncontested Prince elector of Cologne, the first Wittelsbach to hold the position; his family maintained their hold on it until 1761. Under his direction, Jesuits introduced the Counter-Reformation to the north-western German states and under the leadership of his successors, these territories remained a Catholic stronghold until the late eighteenth century.

== Context ==
In this phase of the war, it was a localized feud between supporters of Gebhard, and supporters of the Catholic core of the Cathedral chapter. In the initial outburst after Gebhard's conversion, several of the key men of the Electorate had taken sides. Salentin von Isenburg and his son in law, Count Arenberg, and the Duke Frederick of Saxe-Lauenburg stood against the supporters of Gebhard Truchsess. Gebhard had three primary supporters: his brother, Karl, Truchsess von Waldburg (1548–1593), who had married Eleonore, Countess of Hohenzollern (1551–after 1598); his longtime ally and supporter Count Adolph Neuenar and Herman Neuenar, a member of the Cathedral chapter, and Neuenar's brother-in-law, Count Bentheim.

== Campaign for the Upper Electorate ==
Karl Truchsess, the Elector's brother, burned the Dietkirchen cloister to the ground.

Initially, in the Oberstift, Salentin von Isenburg took the cities of Linz (Linz am Rhein) and Ahrweiler and the district of Altenrath for the Catholic faction. The count Werner von of Reifferscheid, who was the hereditary marshal of the Archdiocese, took command of the Catholic faction's troops. He occupied Bonn, and the Alfter Castle. All the villages and cloisters that lay there, he plundered and set to the torch. Reifferscheid overran Bonn and then took the village of Mehlem, from there he went to a powder supply that Karl Truchsess had established in the vicinity of the city, and took it, and then burned the facility. In the night, overran Bonn by the village of Mehlem. After that, in the middle of the night, he overcame the sentries, and overcame the enemy in deep sleep.

There passed a dreadful carnage. On both sides were the deaths enough. All of the villages by the Rhine were burned. There were dreadful crackling and glow in the deep night. Everything was destroyed, what the one side didn't burn, the other side did. The victor moved toward Bonn and took it in Triumph.

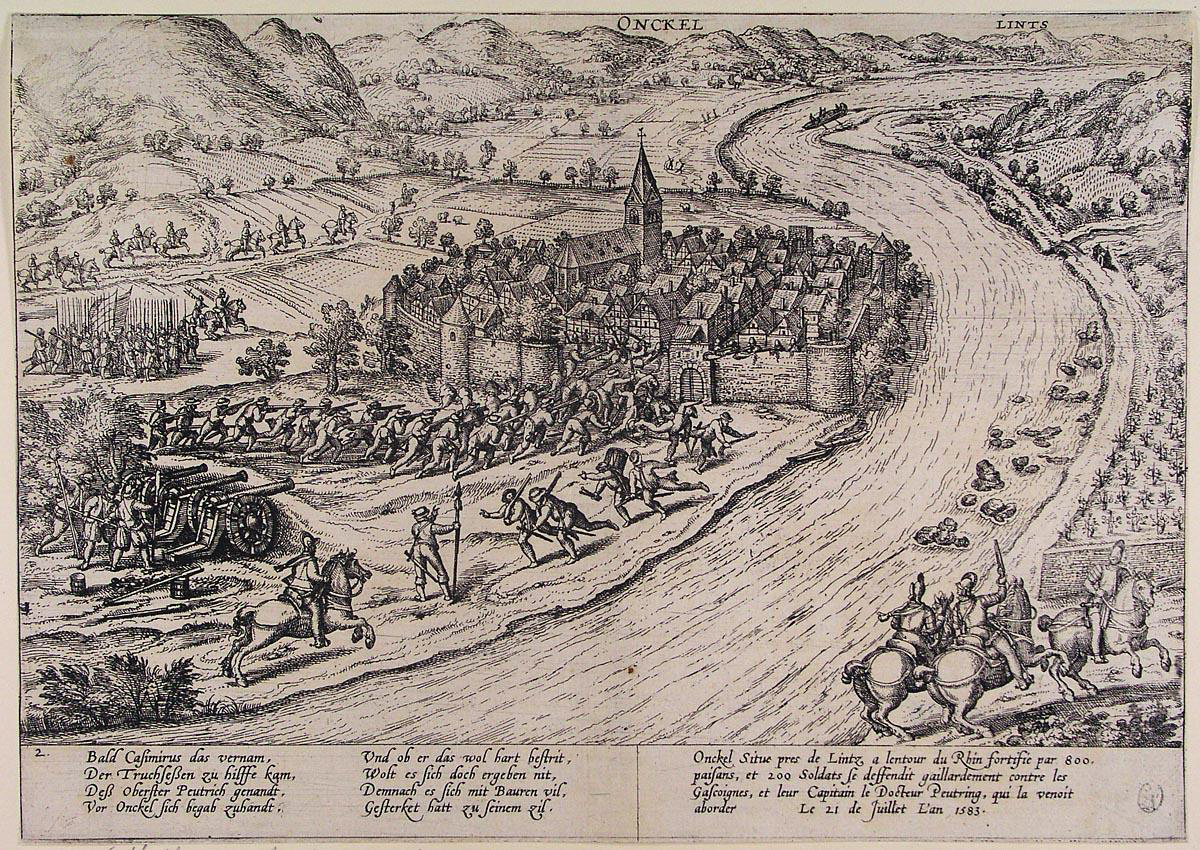
Attack on Neuwied and Onckel

== Siege of Poppelsdorf ==
In November 1583, Ernst's brother laid siege to the Elector's palace at Poppelsdorf. A gothic water fortress had been built in 1341 and was expanded the following year into a double-fortress. Despite its relatively low walls, it held out for two weeks, and Ernst's troops breached the gates on 18 November.

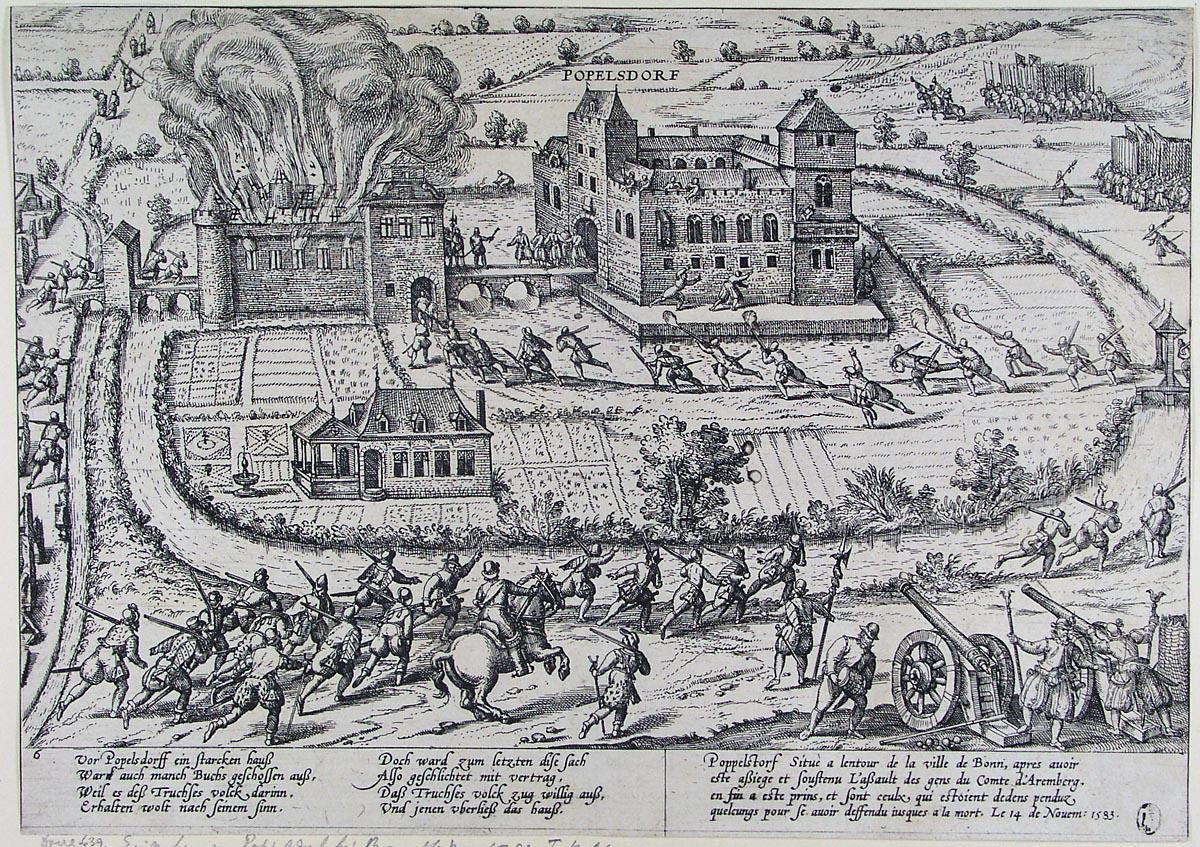
Ernst's troops enter the double fortress at Poppelsdorf November 1583.

== Siege of Hülchrath ==
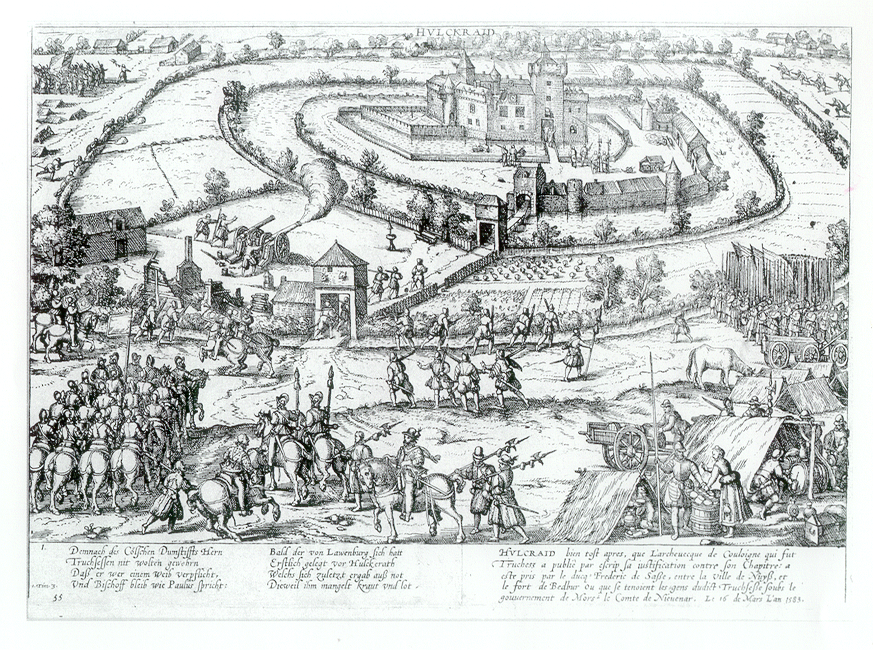
Hülchrath besieged.

== Campaign for the Lower Electorate ==
Rheinberg taken by count Neuenar. He had English and Scottish soldiers that he had recruited in the Netherlands. The church was plundered and the priests abused and mishandled.

== Consequences ==
At this point, on 22 March, in Rome, Pope Gregory XIII excommunicated Gebhard. He declared him alienated from all his possessions, funds, and everything to which he was entitled, including services of people who had promised loyalty to him.

During this early part of the war, the two factions became more clearly defined and from either side, the lines became clearer: if you are not for us, you are against us. It was not possible to remain neutral.
