= Vest Recklinghausen =

Territory of the Holy Roman Empire

Map showing Vest Recklinghausen, the Electorate of Cologne, and nearby cities.

Vest Recklinghausen was an ecclesiastical territory in the Holy Roman Empire, located in the center of today's North Rhine-Westphalia. The rivers Emscher and Lippe formed the border with the County of Mark and Essen Abbey in the south, and to the Bishopric of Münster in the north. In the east, a fortification secured the border with Dortmund and in the west it was bordered by the Duchy of Cleves.

Today Vest Recklinghausen is divided into the Kreis Recklinghausen as well as the city of Bottrop, the northern half of Gelsenkirchen and the Osterfeld Borough of Oberhausen. The term Vest, which denotes a type of judicial district, is still used locally, for instance by a local radio station, a Shopping mall, a Bank and the municipal public transport company Vestische Straßenbahnen GmbH.

== History ==
=== Lordship of Vest Recklinghausen ===
Vest Recklinghausen was first mentioned in 1228 as a fiefdom of the Archbishopric of Cologne. The administrator lived in castle Westerholt, located in Herten. From 1446 to 1576 it was used as collateral, first pawned to the lords of Gemen (now part of the city Borken) and after 1492 to the Lords of Schauenburg and Holstein-Pinneberg, who pawned the territory back to the Archbishops of Cologne in 1576.

During the Cologne War (1583–1589), Vest Recklinghausen was occupied and sacked several times by troops from both sides of the conflict. In 1583, although much of the territory was already Protestant, the Calvinist Elector of Cologne, Gebhard, Truchsess von Waldburg and his wife, Agnes, ordered the destruction of the icons and decorative elements of the churches. In 1584, the territory was sacked again, this time by the competing archbishop, Ernst of Bavaria. In 1586, the territory was invaded by Martin Schenck and Hermann Cloedt, who caused great damage to the farms and small villages, and were besieged by Claude de Berlaymont, also known as Haultpenne, in the city of Werl.

After the turmoil of the Cologne Wars, the administration of Vest Recklinghausen was divided in (circa 1600) in two districts: Recklinghausen continued to administer the eastern section, but Dorsten assumed responsibility for the western section. The town of Recklinghausen including the parish of Recklinghausen and the filial parishes Ahsen, Datteln, Flaesheim, Hamm-Bossendorf, Henrichenburg, Herten, Horneburg, Oer, Suderwich, Waltrop and Westerholt appertained to the eastern part of the Vest Recklinghausen. The western parishes included Dorsten and the parishes Dorsten, Bottrop, Buer, Gladbeck, Horst, Kirchhellen, Marl, Osterfeld and Polsum.

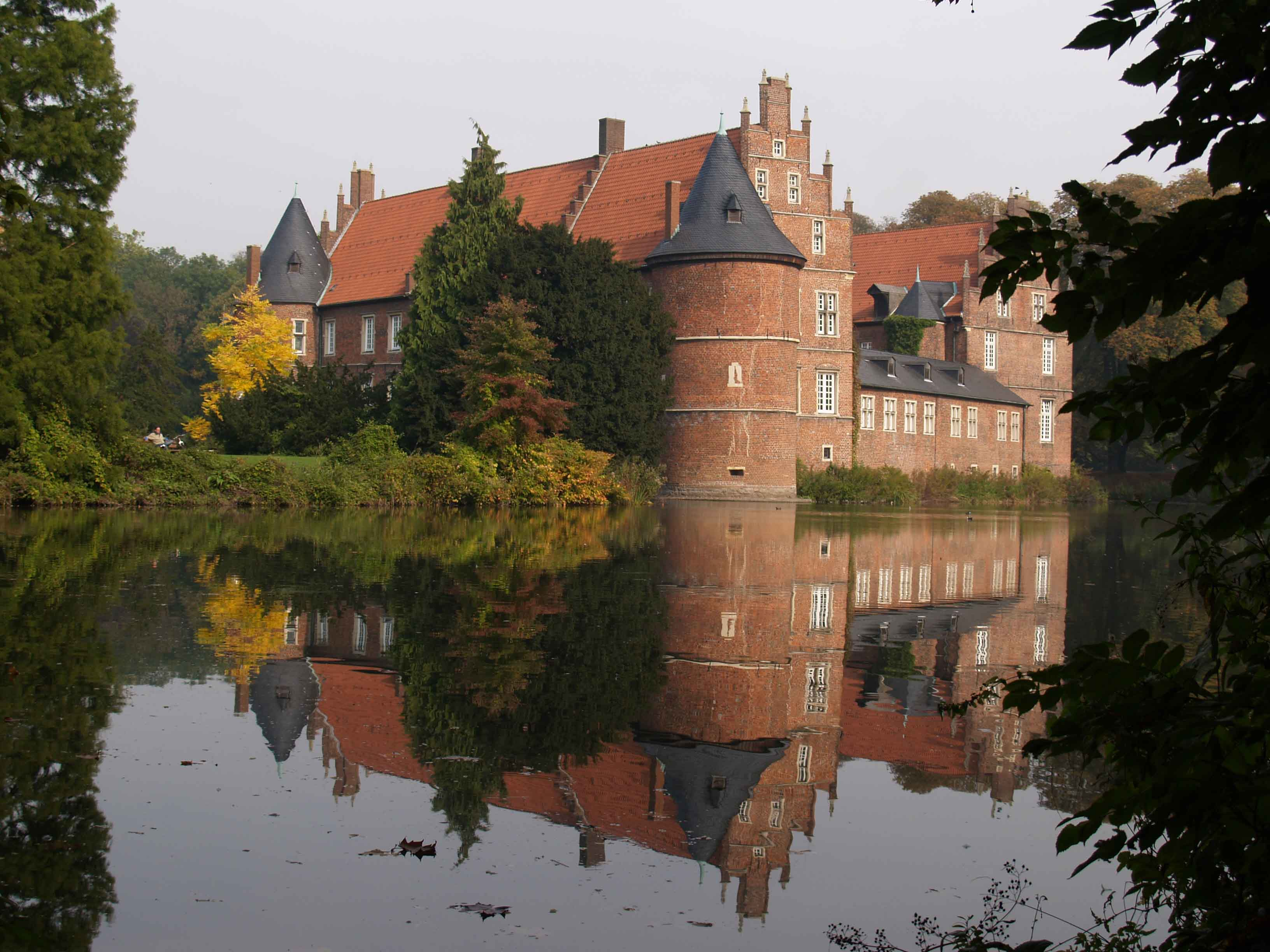
Castle Herten, former residence of the governor of Vest Recklinghausen

On 4 September 1614, Ferdinand of Bavaria, the successor to his uncle, Ernst of Bavaria, as the Elector of Cologne, forbade non-Catholics from staying in Vest Recklinghausen.

During the secularization of the ecclesiastical states in 1802–03, also known as the German Mediatisation, the electorate was abolished and Vest Recklinghausen was annexed by the Dukes of Arenberg. In 1811 it was added to the Grand Duchy of Berg and in 1815 became part of the Prussian province of Westphalia.
