= Destruction of Neuss =

1586 action of the Cologne War

Coordinates: 51°12′1″N 6°41′38″E

- Part of the Cologne War
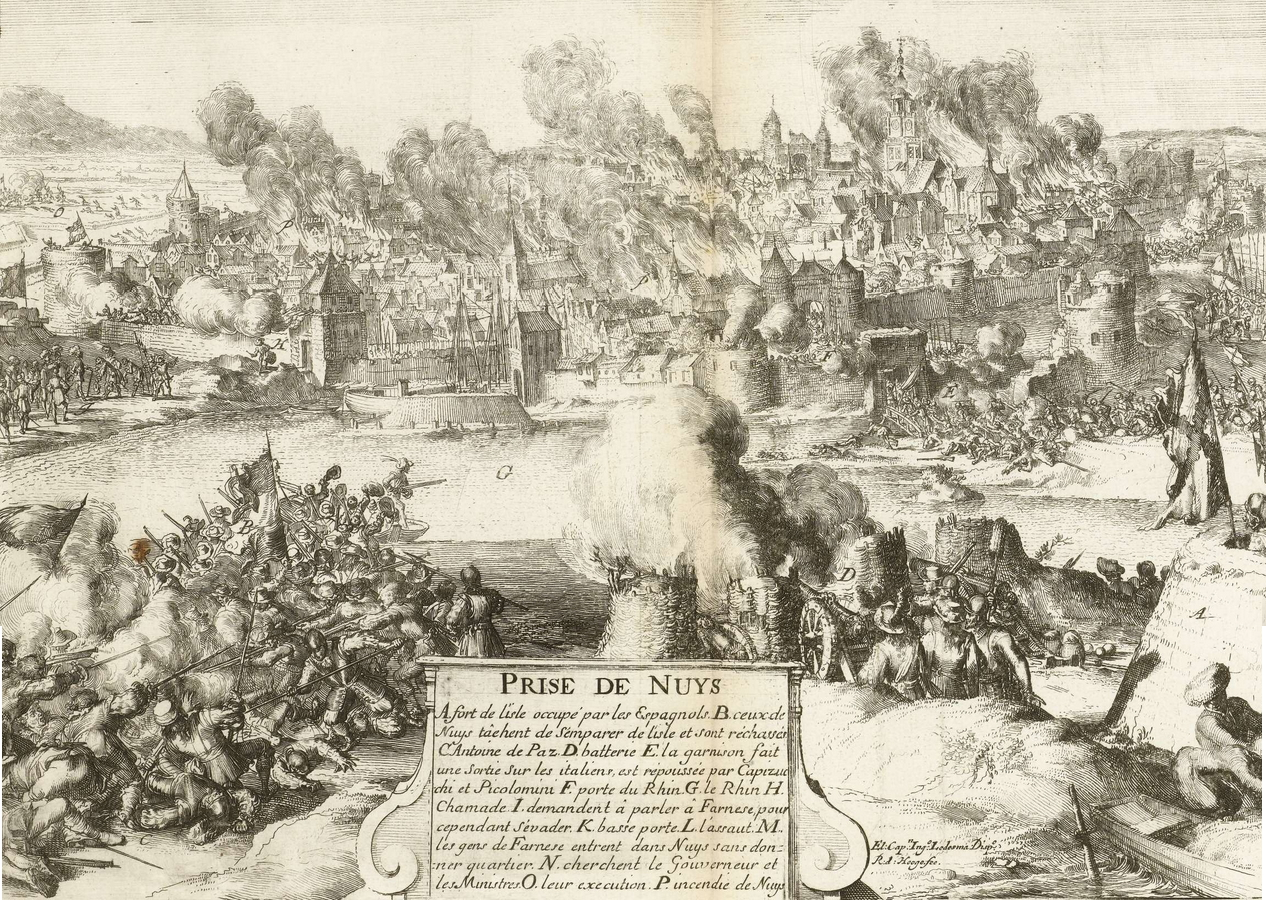
- Great city fire after the siege of Neuss.
Date	July 1586, concluded 26 July 1586
Location	Neuss
Result	Victory for Ernest of Bavaria

Belligerents
(Electorate of Cologne) Pro-Gebhard Truchsess Cologne (Dutch Republic) States-General	(Electorate of Cologne) Pro-Ernest of Bavaria Cologne (Spanish Empire) Spain

Commanders and leaders
(Dutch Republic) Hermann Friedrich Cloedt †	(Spanish Empire) Alexander Farnese, Duke of Parma

Strength
Garrison: 1,600 Dutch and German; Artillery: none	Troops: 8,000 infantry, 2,000 cavalry Artillery: 45

Casualties and losses
Garrison: no known survivors Civilian and military dead: 4,000+	<500

The Destruction of Neuss occurred in July 1586, during the Cologne War. Alexander Farnese, Duke of Parma's troops surrounded the city of Neuss, an important Protestant garrison in the Electorate of Cologne. After the city refused to capitulate, Parma's army reduced the city to rubble through a combination of artillery fire, destructive house-to-house fighting, and plundering; during the battle, a fire started that destroyed most of the rest of the city. Approximately 3,000 civilians died, out of a population of around 4,500, and the entire garrison was killed.

== Situation in 1586 ==
Neuss had been seized by supporters of the Protestant Prince-Elector Gebhard Truchsess von Waldburg in February 1586. Adolf, Count of Moers and Neuenahr, reinforced and supplied the city and took most of his troops north, to Moers and Venlo, leaving the young Friedrich Cloedt in command of the city. Cloedt had a garrison of 1600 men, mostly Germans and Dutch soldiers; some had military experience, but many were recent recruits. One hundred years earlier it had resisted a lengthy siege by Charles the Bold of Burgundy, and for its efforts, the emperor had granted Neuss the right to mint its own coins and to incorporate the imperial arms in its own coat of arms. In June, the Duke of Parma approached the city and surrounded its landed fortifications; he was supported by Karl von Mansfeld, Francisco Verdugo, and Salentin VII of Isenburg-Grenzau.

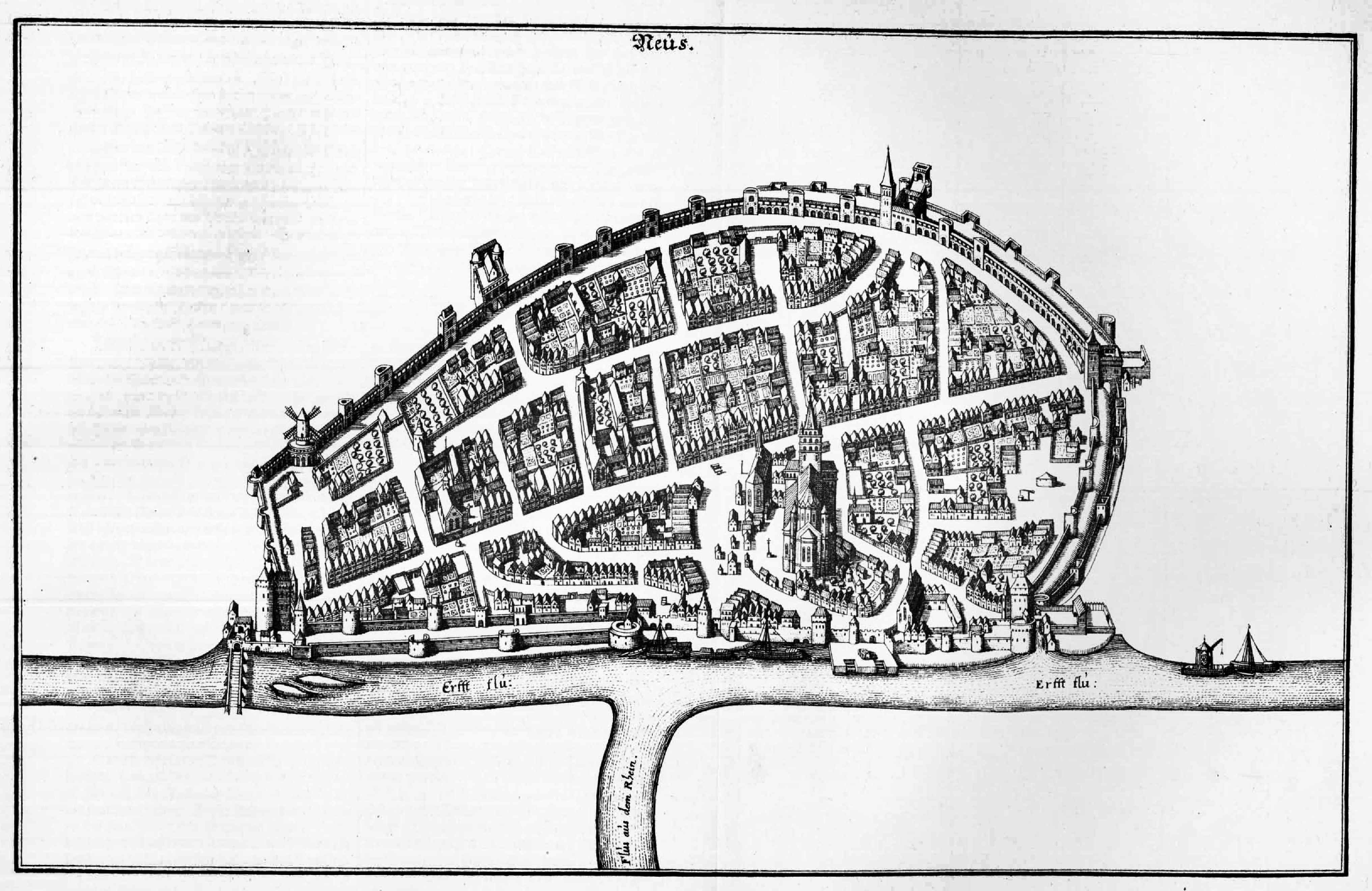
Engraved map of the city of Neuss

Parma had an impressive force at his command; in addition to Mansfeld's 2000 troops, he had another 6,000 or so foot and Tercios, plus 2,000 mounted, experienced Italian, Spanish, and some German soldiers, plus some 45 cannons, which Parma distributed on the redoubt across the river, and on the heights some short distance from the city walls. Prior to the cannonade, Parma requested the capitulation of the city, which was declined, officially with great politeness, but as Parma's emissary returned to the Spanish camp, he was followed by jeers and insults from the townsmen. The next day, being the feast of St. James, and the patron day for the Spanish, the battle was not joined, however, reports circulated in the Spanish camp that two soldiers, captured in the previous days' sorties, had been roasted alive in the market square to desecrate the Holy day.

The Electorate of Cologne, circa 1580. The City of Cologne, although part of the archdiocese, was not part of the Electorate.

== Battle ==
Once the cannonade began, Parma's 45 artillery pounded at the walls for 30 hours with iron cannonballs weighing 30 to 50 pounds, in total 2700 rounds were fired. The Spanish made several attacks, each repelled. With the ninth assault, the outer wall was breached, and soldiers poured into the city, the Italians from one end, and the Spanish from the other. They met in the marketplace in the middle (see map of the city—above).

Cloedt, gravely injured (his leg was reportedly nearly ripped off and he had five other serious wounds), had been carried into the town. The Spanish and Italian forces entered the town from opposing ends, and met in the middle. Parma was reportedly inclined to honor the garrison commander; Ernst demanded his blood. Soldiers found Cloedt and the dying man was hanged from the window, along with several dozen others in his force. Italian and Spanish soldiers, on their rampage through the city, slaughtered the rest of the garrison, even the men who tried to surrender. Women, who had taken refuge in some of the churches, were initially spared, but when the fire started, they were forced into the street. Contemporary accounts refer to children, women, and old men, their clothes in sparks or flames, trying to escape the conflagration, only to be trapped by the enraged soldiers; if they escaped the flames and the Spanish, they still had to elude the Italians. Parma wrote to the king (of Spain) that over 4000 lay dead in the ditches. English observers confirmed this report, and elaborated that only 8 buildings remained standing.

== Aftermath ==
Although Parma had taken the city, his Protestant opponents took some comfort in the fact that the city had been destroyed in the process and was of no use as a garrison. Yet this was in no way a Pyrrhic victory; Parma had lost fewer than 500 of his own force, and the Protestant rebels had lost a significant geographical and militarily strategic point, and one of their more intrepid young commanders in Cloedt. Parma had nearly unfettered access to the Electorate's northern regions, called the Niederstift, from which he could mount an attack on the rebellious provinces of the Netherlands. Gebhard renounced of the Electorate in 1588. Despite Ernst of Bavaria's unchallenged possession, Parma continued to acquire and fortify towns throughout the region.

== Bibliography ==
- Davies, Charles Maurice. The history of Holland and the Dutch nation, vol. 3, London: G. Willis, 1851.
- (in German) Ennen, Leonard. Geschichte der Stadt Köln. Düsseldorf: Schwann'schen. (1863–1880).
- (in German) Hennes, Johann Heinrich. Der Kampf um das Erzstift Köln zur Zeit der Kurfürsten. Köln: DuMont-Schauberg. 1878.
- Holborn, Hajo, A History of Modern Germany, The Reformation. Princeton NJ: Princeton University Press, 1959.
