= Cologne War =

1583–1588 religious war in Germany

- Part of the European wars of religion
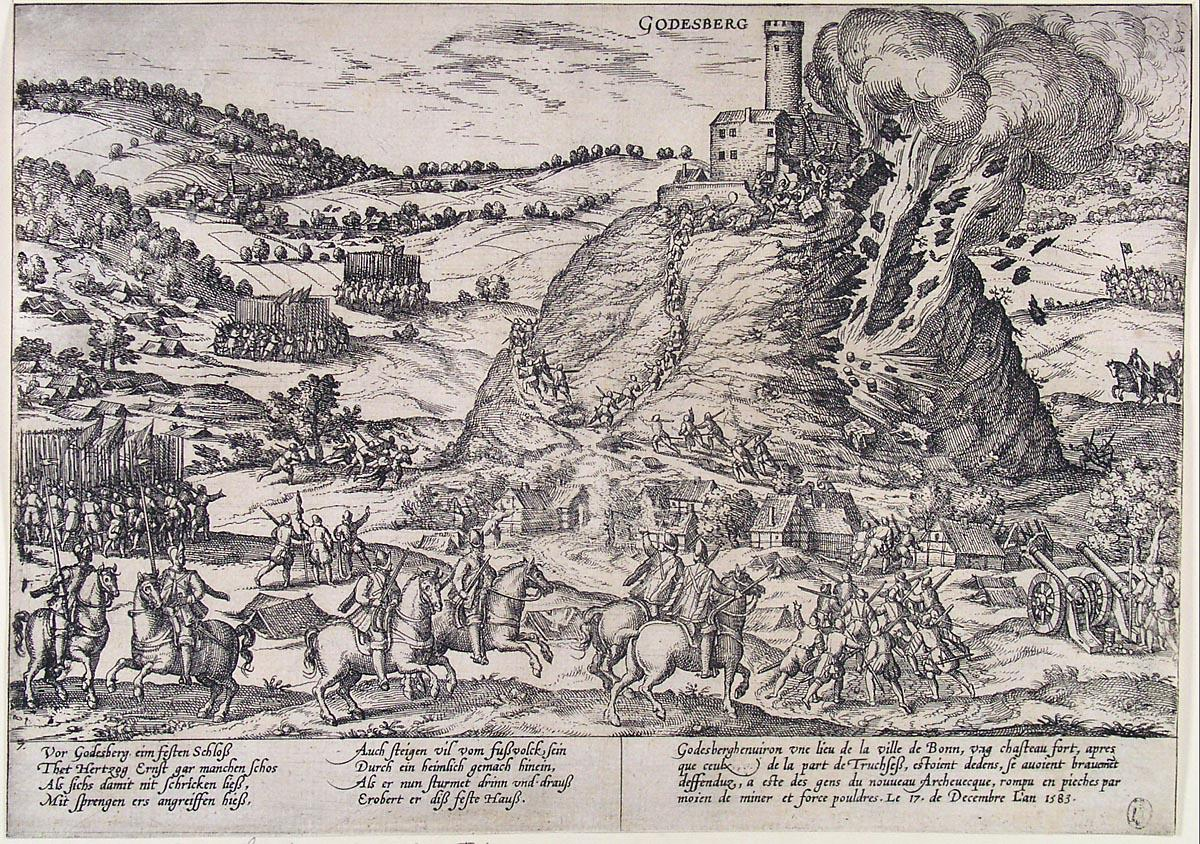
- Destruction of Godesburg fortress during the Cologne War, 1583
Date	1583–1588 (5 years)
Location	Electorate of Cologne 50°44′2″N 7°6′0″E
Result	Roman Catholic victory

Belligerents
Gebhard Truchsess von Waldburg, Prince-Elector, Cologne 1578–1588; House of Neuenahr-Alpen; House of Waldburg; House of Palatinate-Zweibrücken; House of Nassau; House of Solms-Braunfels; (Dutch Republic) States-General (until 1588); Dutch Republic (from 1588)	Ernst of Bavaria Prince-Elector, Cologne, 1583–1612; House of Wittelsbach; Free Imperial City of Cologne; Philip of Spain, and for him: House of Farnese; House of Isenburg-Grenzau; House of Mansfeld-Vorderort; House of Berlaymont-Flyon; Spanish Empire

Commanders and leaders
Johann Casimir of Simmern; Adolf, Count von Neuenahr; Karl, Truchsess von Waldburg; Martin Schenk von Nydedeck †; (Dutch Republic) Friedrich Cloedt †	Ferdinand of Bavaria; Alexander Farnese, Duke of Parma; Karl von Mansfeld; Frederick, Duke of Saxe-Lauenburg; Claude de Berlaymont †; Salentin IX of Isenburg-Grenzau; Francisco Verdugo

Strength
variable: 10,000–28,000 until 1586	variable: 10,000–28,000 until 1586, plus 18,000–28,000 troops of the Spanish Army of Flanders after 1586

Casualties and losses
Over 4,000	Over 1,000
- Location within present day Germany

The Cologne War (German: Kölner Krieg, Kölnischer Krieg, Truchsessischer Krieg; 1583–1588) was a conflict between Protestant and Catholic factions that devastated the Electorate of Cologne, a historical ecclesiastical principality of the Holy Roman Empire, within present-day North Rhine-Westphalia, in Germany. The war occurred within the context of the Protestant Reformation in Germany and the subsequent Counter-Reformation, and concurrently with the Dutch Revolt and the French Wars of Religion.

Also called the Seneschal's War (Truchsessischer Krieg) or the Seneschal Upheaval (Truchsessischer Wirren) and occasionally the Sewer War, the conflict tested the principle of ecclesiastical reservation, which had been included in the religious Peace of Augsburg (1555). This principle excluded, or "reserved", the ecclesiastical territories of the Holy Roman Empire from the application of cuius regio, eius religio, or "whose rule, his religion", as the primary means of determining the religion of a territory. It stipulated instead that if an ecclesiastical prince converted to Protestantism, he would resign from his position rather than force the conversion of his subjects.

In December 1582, Gebhard Truchsess von Waldburg, the Prince-elector of Cologne, converted to Protestantism. The principle of ecclesiastical reservation required his resignation. Instead, he declared religious parity for his subjects and, in 1583, married Agnes von Mansfeld-Eisleben, intending to convert the ecclesiastical principality into a secular, dynastic duchy. A faction in the Cathedral Chapter elected another archbishop, Ernst of Bavaria.

Initially, troops of the competing archbishops of Cologne fought over control of sections of the territory. Several of the barons and counts holding territory with feudal obligations to the Elector also held territory in nearby provinces: Westphalia, Liege, and the Southern, or Spanish Netherlands. Complexities of enfeoffment and dynastic appanage magnified a localized feud into one including supporters from the Electorate of the Palatinate and Dutch, Scots, and English mercenaries on the Protestant side, and Bavarian and papal mercenaries on the Catholic side. The conflict coincided with the Dutch Revolt, 1568–1648, encouraging the participation of the rebellious Dutch provinces and the Spanish. In 1586, the conflict expanded further, with the direct involvement of Spanish troops and Italian mercenaries on the Catholic side, and financial and diplomatic support from Henry III of France and Elizabeth I of England on the Protestant side.

The war concluded with the victory of the Catholic archbishop Ernst, who expelled the Protestant archbishop Gebhard from the Electorate. This outcome consolidated Wittelsbach authority in north-west Germany and encouraged a Catholic revival in the states along the lower Rhine. More broadly, the conflict set a precedent for foreign intervention in German religious and dynastic matters, which would be widely followed during the Thirty Years' War (1618–1648).

== Background ==
=== Religious divisions in the Holy Roman Empire ===
Prior to the 16th century, the Catholic Church had been the sole official Christian faith in the Holy Roman Empire. Martin Luther's initial agenda called for the reform of the Church's doctrines and practices, but after his excommunication from the Church his ideas became embodied in an altogether separate religious movement, Lutheranism. Initially dismissed by Holy Roman Emperor Charles V as an inconsequential argument between monks, the idea of a reformation of the Church's doctrines, considered infallible and sacrosanct by Catholic teaching, accentuated controversy and competition in many of the territories of the Holy Roman Empire and quickly devolved into armed factions that exacerbated existing social, political, and territorial grievances. These tensions were embodied in such alliances as the Protestant Schmalkaldic League, through which many of the Lutheran princes agreed to protect each other from encroachment on their territories and local authority; in retaliation, the princes that remained loyal to the Catholic Church formed the Holy League. By the mid-1530s, the German-speaking states of the Holy Roman Empire had devolved into armed factions determined by family ties, geographic needs, religious loyalties, and dynastic aspirations. The religious issue both accentuated and masked these secular conflicts.

Princes and clergy alike understood that institutional abuses hindered the practices of the faithful, but they disagreed on the solution to the problem. The Protestants believed a reform of doctrine was needed (especially regarding the Church's teachings on justification, indulgences, Purgatory, and the Papacy) while those that remained Catholic wished to reform the morals of the clergy only, without sacrificing Catholic doctrine. Pope Paul III convened a council to examine the problem in 1537 and instituted several internal, institutional reforms intended to obviate some of the most flagrant prebendary abuses, simony, and nepotism; despite efforts by both the Holy Roman Emperor Charles V and the Roman Pontiff, unification of the two strands of belief foundered on different concepts of "Church" and the principle of justification. Catholics clung to the traditional teaching that the Catholic Church alone is the one true Church, while Protestants insisted that the Church Christ founded was invisible and not tied to any single religious institution on earth. Regarding justification, the Lutherans insisted that it occurred by faith alone, while the Catholics upheld the traditional Catholic doctrine that justification involves both faith and active charity. The Schmalkaldic League called its own ecumenical council in 1537, and set forward several precepts of faith. When the delegates met in Regensburg in 1540–41, representatives agreed on the doctrine of faith and justification, but could not agree on sacraments, confession, absolution, and the definition of the church. Catholic and Lutheran adherents seemed further apart than ever; in only a few towns and cities were Lutherans and Catholics able to live together in even a semblance of harmony. By 1548, political disagreements overlapped with religious issues, making any kind of agreement seem remote.

In 1548 Charles declared an interreligio imperialis (also known as the Augsburg Interim) through which he sought to find some common ground for religious peace. This effort alienated both Protestant and Catholic princes and the papacy; even Charles, whose decree it was, was unhappy with the political and diplomatic dimensions of what amounted to half of a religious settlement. The 1551–52 sessions convened by Pope Julius III at the supposedly ecumenical Council of Trent solved none of the larger religious issues but simply restated Catholic teaching and condemned Protestant teaching as heresies.

=== Overcoming religious division ===
Peace of Augsburg
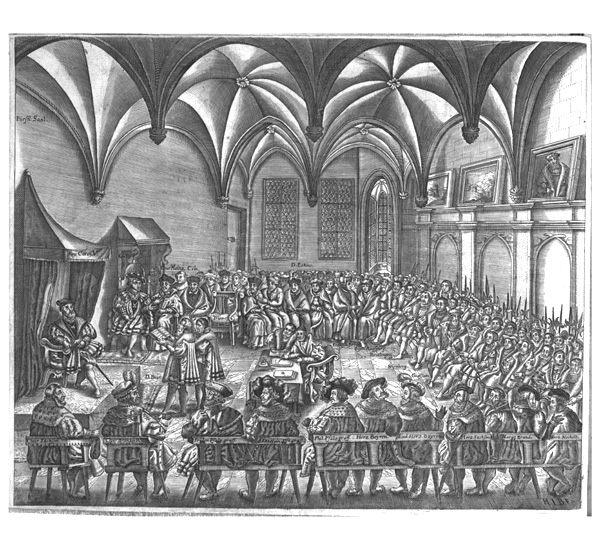
- Negotiating the Peace of Augsburg
- Date: 1555
- Location: Augsburg
- Participants: Ferdinand, King of the Romans acting for Charles V. Delegates from the Imperial Estates
- Outcome: (1) The principle of cuius regio, eius religio established religious conformity within a single state. Two confessions of faith were acceptable: Catholicism or the Augsburg Confession (Lutheranism). Any other expression of faith was heretical. (2) The principle of reservatum ecclesiasticum protected religious conformity within the ecclesiastical estates, but it did not clearly state how this was to be protected. (3) The Declaratio Ferdinandei granted certain exemptions to the principle of cuius regio, eius religio to some knights, sovereign families, and imperial cities.

Charles' interim solution failed. He ordered a general Diet in Augsburg at which the various states would discuss the religious problem and its solution. He himself did not attend, and delegated authority to his brother, Ferdinand, to "act and settle" disputes of territory, religion, and local power. At the conference, Ferdinand cajoled, persuaded, and threatened the various representatives into agreement on three important principles. The principle of cuius regio, eius religio provided for internal religious unity within a state: The religion of the prince became the religion of the state and all its inhabitants. Those inhabitants who could not conform to the prince's religion were allowed to leave, an innovative idea in the 16th century; this principle was discussed at length by the various delegates, who finally reached agreement on the specifics of its wording after examining the problem and the proposed solution from every possible angle. The second principle covered the special status of the ecclesiastical states, called the ecclesiastical reservation, or reservatum ecclesiasticum. If the prelate of an ecclesiastic state changed his religion, the men and women living in that state did not have to do so. Instead, the prelate was expected to resign from his post, although this was not spelled out in the agreement. The third principle, known as Ferdinand's Declaration, exempted knights and some of the cities from the requirement of religious uniformity, if the reformed religion had been practiced there since the mid-1520s, allowing for a few mixed cities and towns where Catholics and Lutherans had lived together. It also protected the authority of the princely families, the knights, and some of the cities to determine what religious uniformity meant in their territories. Ferdinand inserted this at the last minute, on his own authority.

=== Remaining problems ===
After 1555, the Peace of Augsburg became the legitimating legal document governing the co-existence of the Lutheran and Catholic faiths in the German lands of the Holy Roman Empire, and it served to ameliorate many of the tensions between followers of the so-called Old Faith and the followers of Luther, but it had two fundamental flaws. First, Ferdinand had rushed the article on ecclesiastical reservation through the debate; it had not undergone the scrutiny and discussion that attended the widespread acceptance and support of cuius regio, eius religio. Consequently, its wording did not cover all, or even most, potential legal scenarios. The Declaratio Ferdinandei was not debated in plenary session at all; using his authority to "act and settle," Ferdinand had added it at the last minute, responding to lobbying by princely families and knights.

While these specific failings came back to haunt the Empire in subsequent decades, perhaps the greatest weakness of the Peace of Augsburg was its failure to take into account the growing diversity of religious expression emerging in the evangelical (Lutheran) and Reformed traditions. Other confessions had acquired popular, if not legal, legitimacy in the intervening decades and by 1555, the reforms proposed by Luther were no longer the only possibilities of religious expression: Anabaptists, such as the Frisian Menno Simons and his followers; the followers of John Calvin, who were particularly strong in the southwest and the northwest; and the followers of Huldrych Zwingli were excluded from considerations and protections under the Peace of Augsburg. According to the Augsburg agreement, their religious beliefs remained heretical.

=== Charles V's abdication ===
In 1556, amid great pomp, and leaning on the shoulder of one of his favorites (the 24-year-old William, Count of Nassau and Orange), Charles gave away his lands and his offices. The Spanish Empire, which included Spain, the Netherlands, Naples, Milan, and Spain's possessions in the Americas, went to his son, Philip. His brother, Ferdinand, who had negotiated the treaty in the previous year, was already in possession of the Austrian lands and was also the obvious candidate to succeed Charles as Holy Roman Emperor.

Charles' choices were appropriate. Philip was culturally Spanish: he was born in Valladolid and raised in the Spanish court, his native tongue was Spanish, and he preferred to live in Spain. Ferdinand was familiar with, and to, the other princes of the Holy Roman Empire. Although he too had been born in Spain, he had administered his brother's affairs in the Empire since 1531. Some historians maintain Ferdinand had also been touched by the reformed philosophies, and was probably the closest the Holy Roman Empire ever came to a Protestant emperor; he remained at least nominally a Catholic throughout his life, although reportedly he refused last rites on his deathbed. Other historians maintain that while Ferdinand was a practicing Catholic, unlike his brother he considered religion to be outside the political sphere.

Charles' abdication had far-reaching consequences in imperial diplomatic relations with France and the Netherlands, particularly in his allotment of the Spanish kingdom to Philip. In France, the kings and their ministers grew increasingly uneasy about Habsburg encirclement and sought allies against Habsburg hegemony from among the border German territories; they were even prepared to ally with some of the Protestant kings. In the Netherlands, Philip's ascension in Spain raised particular problems; for the sake of harmony, order, and prosperity, Charles had not oppressed the Reformation as harshly there as did Philip, and Charles had even tolerated a high level of local autonomy. An ardent Catholic and rigidly autocratic prince, Philip pursued an aggressive political, economic, and religious policy toward the Dutch, resulting in their rebellion shortly after he became king. Philip's militant response meant the occupation of much of the upper provinces by troops of, or hired by, Habsburg Spain and the constant ebb and flow of Spanish men and provisions over the Spanish road from northern Italy, through the Burgundian lands, into and from Flanders.

== Cause of the war ==
A map of the Electorate of Cologne showing key cities and towns. The city of Cologne was not a part of the territory of the Electorate, although it was part of the episcopal diocese. The gray lines are modern borders and the rivers are shown in their modern course; all boundaries are approximate.

As an ecclesiastical principality of the Holy Roman Empire, the Electorate of Cologne (German: Kurfürstentum Köln or Kurköln) included the temporal possessions of the Archbishop of Cologne (German: Erzbistum Köln): the so-called Oberstift (the southern part of the Electorate), the northern section, called the Niederstift, the fiefdom of Vest Recklinghausen and the Duchy of Westphalia, plus several small uncontiguous territories separated from the Electorate by the neighboring Duchies of Cleves, Berg, Julich and Mark. Encircled by the electoral territory, Cologne was part of the archdiocese but not among the Elector's temporal possessions. The Electorate was ruled by an archbishop prince-elector of the empire. As an archbishop, he was responsible for the spiritual leadership of one of the richest sees in the Empire, and entitled to draw on its wealth. As a prince-prelate, he stood in the highest social category of the Empire, with specific and expansive legal, economic, and juridical rights. As an Elector, he was one of the men who elected the Holy Roman Emperor from among a group of imperial candidates.

The Electorate obtained its name from the city, and Cologne had served as the capital of the archbishopric until 1288. After that, the archbishop and Prince-elector used the smaller cities of Bonn, 30 kilometers (19 mi) south of Cologne, and Brühl, 12 km (7.5 mi) south of Cologne, on the Rhine River, as his capital and residence; by 1580, both his residence and the capital were located in Bonn. Although the city of Cologne obtained its status as a free imperial city in 1478, the Archbishop of Cologne retained judicial rights in the city; he acted as a Vogt, or reeve, and reserved the right of blood justice, or Blutgericht; only he could impose the so-called blood punishments, which included capital punishments, but also physical punishments that drew blood. Regardless of his position as judge, he could not enter the city of Cologne except under special circumstances, and between the city council and the elector-archbishop, a politically and diplomatically precarious and usually adversarial relationship developed over the centuries.

The position of archbishop was usually held by a scion of nobility, and not necessarily a priest; this widespread practice allowed younger sons of noble houses to find prestigious and financially secure positions without the requirements of priesthood. The archbishop and prince-elector was chosen by the cathedral chapter, the members of which also served as his advisers. As members of a cathedral chapter, they participated in the Mass, or sang the Mass; in addition, they performed other duties as needed. They were not required to be priests but they could, if they wished, take Holy orders. As prebendaries, they received stipends from cathedral income; depending on the location and wealth of the cathedral, this could amount to substantial annual income. In the Electorate, the Chapter included 24 canons of various social ranks; they each had a place in the choir, based on their rank, which in turn was usually derived from the social standing of their families.

=== Election of 1577 ===
When his nephew, Arnold, died without issue, Salentin von Isenburg-Grenzau resigned from the office of Elector (September 1577) and, in December, married Antonia Wilhelmine d'Arenburg, sister of Charles de Ligne, Prince of Arenberg. Salentin's resignation required the election of a new archbishop and prince-elector from among the Cathedral Chapter. Two candidates emerged. Gebhard was the second son of William, Truchsess of Waldburg, known as William the younger, and Johanna von Fürstenberg. He was descended from the Jacobin line of the House of Waldburg; his uncle was a cardinal, and his family had significant imperial contacts. The second candidate, Ernst of Bavaria, was the third son of Albert V, Duke of Bavaria. As a member of the powerful House of Wittelsbach, Ernst could marshal support from his extensive family connections throughout the Catholic houses of the empire; he also had contacts in important canonic establishments at Salzburg, Trier, Würzburg, and Münster that could exert collateral pressure.

Ernst had been a canon at Cologne since 1570. He had the support of the neighboring Duke of Jülich and several allies within the Cathedral Chapter. Although supported by both the papacy and his influential father, a 1571 effort to secure for him the office of coadjutor of the electorate of Cologne had failed once Salentin had agreed to abide by the Trentine proceedings; as the coadjutor bishop, Ernst would have been well-positioned to present himself as Salentin's logical successor. Since then, however, he had advanced in other sees, becoming bishop of Liège, Freising, and Hildesheim, important strongholds of Counter-Reformation Catholicism. He was a career cleric, not necessarily qualified to be an archbishop on the basis of his theological erudition, but by his family connections. His membership in several chapters extended the family influence, and his status as a prebendary gave him a portion of revenues from several cathedrals. He had been educated by Jesuits and the papacy considered collaboration with his family as a means to limit the spread of Lutheranism and Calvinism in the northern provinces.

Also a younger son, Gebhard had prepared for an ecclesiastical career with a broad, Humanist education; apart from his native German, he had learned several languages (including Latin, Italian, French), and studied history and theology. After studying at the universities of Dillingen, Ingolstadt, Perugia, Louvain, and elsewhere, he began his ecclesiastical career in 1560 at Augsburg. His conduct at Augsburg caused some scandal; the bishop, his uncle, petitioned the Duke of Bavaria to remonstrate with him about it, which apparently led to some improvement in his behavior. In 1561, he became a deacon at Cologne Cathedral (1561–1577), a canon of St. Gereon, the basilica in Cologne (1562–1567), a canon in Strassburg (1567–1601), in Ellwangen (1567–1583), and in Würzburg (1569–1570). In 1571, he became deacon of Strassburg Cathedral, a position he held until his death. In 1576, by papal nomination, he also became provost of the Cathedral in Augsburg. Similar to his opponent, these positions brought him influence and wealth; they had little to do with his priestly character.

If the election had been left to the papacy, Ernst would have been the choice, but the Pope was not a member of the Cathedral Chapter and Gebhard had the support of several of the Catholic, and all the Protestant, canons in the Chapter. In December 1577, he was chosen Elector and Archbishop of Cologne after a spirited contest with the papacy's candidate, Ernst: Gebhard won the election by two votes. Although it was not required of him, Gebhard agreed to undergo priestly ordination; he was duly consecrated in March 1578, and swore to uphold the Council of Trent's decrees.

=== Gebhard's conversion ===
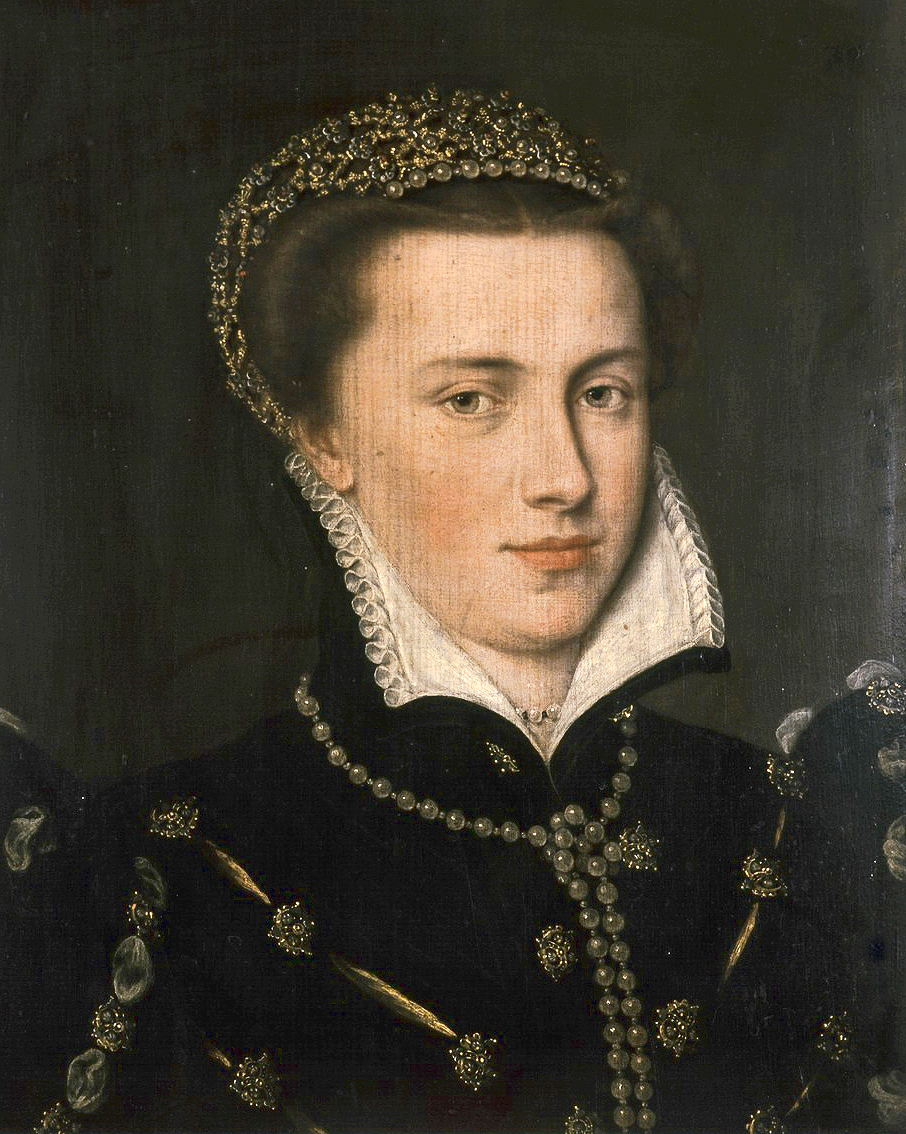
Agnes von Mansfeld-Eisleben

Agnes von Mansfeld-Eisleben was a Protestant canoness at the cloister in Gerresheim, today a district of Düsseldorf. Her family was a cadet line of the old House of Mansfeld which, by the mid-16th century, had lost much of its affluence, but not its influence. The Mansfeld-Eisleben line retained significant authority in its district; several of Agnes' cousins and uncles had signed the Book of Concord, and the family exercised considerable influence in Reformation affairs. She had been raised in Eisleben, the town in which Martin Luther had been born. The family's estates were located in Saxony, but Agnes' sister lived in the city of Cologne, married to the Freiherr (or Baron), Peter von Kriechingen. Although a member of the Gerresheim cloister, Agnes was free during her days to go where she wished. Reports differ on how she came to Gebhard's notice. Some say he saw her on one of her visits to her sister in Cologne. Others claim he noticed her during a religious procession. Regardless, in late 1579 or early 1580, she attracted Gebhard's notice. He sought her out, and they started a liaison. Two of her brothers, Ernst and Hoyer Christoph, soon visited Gebhard at the archbishop's residence to discuss a marriage. "Gebhard's Catholic belief, which was by no means based on his innermost conviction, started to waver when he had to decide whether to renounce the bishop's mitre and stay faithful to the woman he loved, or to renounce his love and remain a member of the church hierarchy." While he considered this, rumors of his possible conversion flew throughout the Electorate.

The mere possibility of Gebhard's conversion caused consternation in the Electorate, in the Empire, and in such European states as England and France. Gebhard considered his options, and listened to his advisers, chief among them his brother Karl, Truchsess von Waldburg, and Adolf, Count von Neuenahr. His opponents in the Cathedral Chapter enlisted external support from the Wittelsbachs in Bavaria and from the Pope. Diplomats shuttled from court to court through the Rhineland, bearing pleas to Gebhard to consider the outcome of a conversion, and how it would destroy the Electorate. These diplomats assured him of support for his cause should he convert and hold the Electorate and threats to destroy him if he did convert. The magistrates of Cologne vehemently opposed any possible conversion and the extension of parity to Protestants in the archdiocese. His Protestant supporters told Gebhard that he could marry the woman and keep the Electorate, converting it into a dynastic duchy. Throughout the Electorate, and on its borders, his supporters and opponents gathered their troops, armed their garrisons, stockpiled foodstuffs, and prepared for war. On 19 December 1582, Gebhard announced his conversion, from, as he phrased it, the "darkness of the papacy to the Light" of the Word of God.

=== Implications of his conversion ===
The conversion of the Archbishop of Cologne to Protestantism triggered religious and political repercussions throughout the Holy Roman Empire. His conversion had widespread implications for the future of the Holy Roman Empire's electoral process established by the Golden Bull of 1356. In this process, seven Imperial Electors—the four secular electors of Bohemia, Brandenburg, the Palatinate, and Saxony; and the three ecclesiastical electors of Mainz, Trier, and Cologne—selected an emperor. The presence of at least three inherently Catholic electors, who collectively governed some of the most prosperous ecclesiastical territories in the Empire, guaranteed the delicate balance of Catholics and Protestants in the voting; only one other elector needed to vote for a Catholic candidate, ensuring that future emperors would remain in the so-called Old Faith. The possibility of one of those electors shifting to the Protestant side, and of that elector producing an heir to perpetuate this shift, would change the balance in the electoral college in favor of the Protestants.

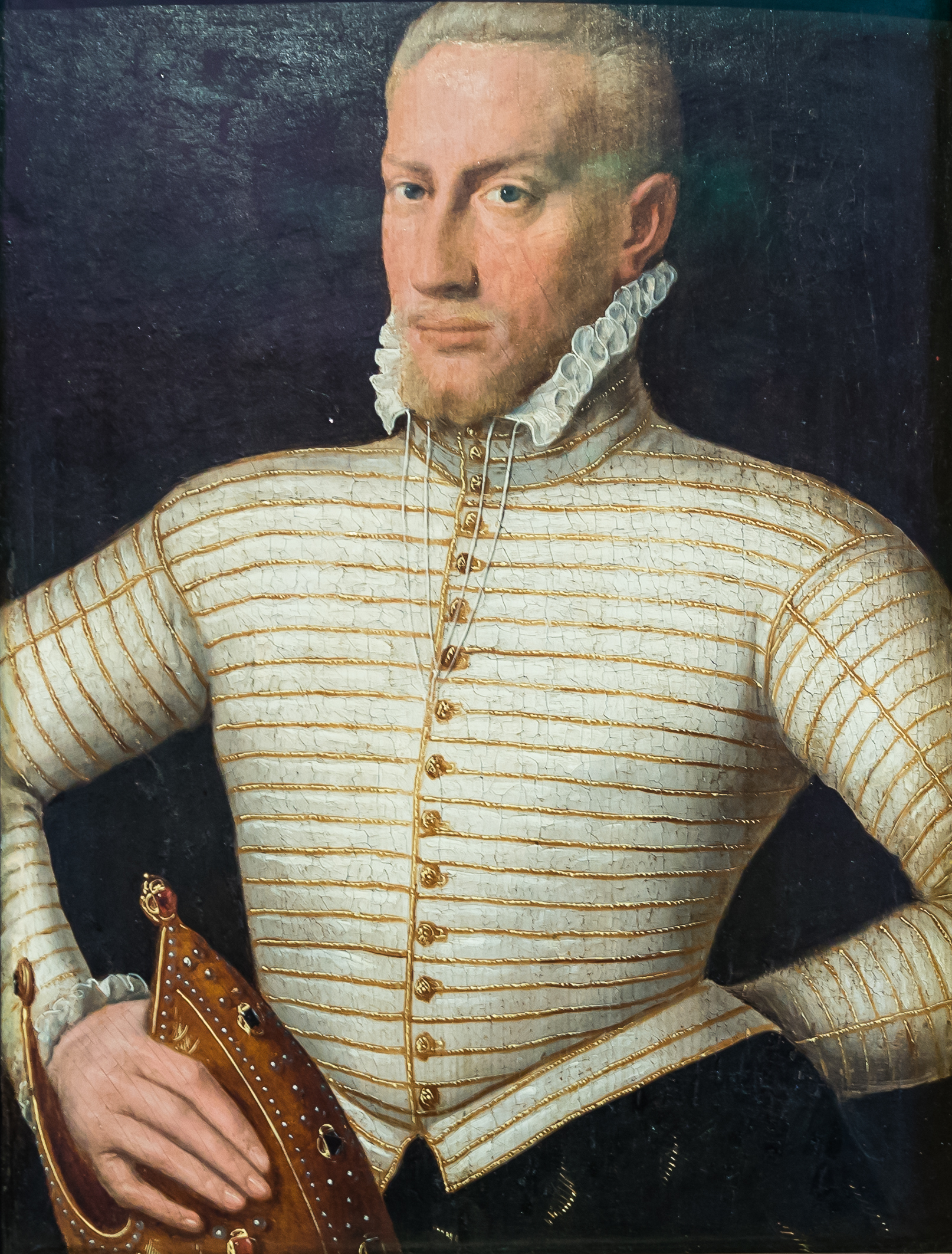
Gebhard von Waldburg-Trauchburg, whose conversion to Protestantism, subsequent marriage, and refusal to resign from the See triggered the war

The conversion of the ecclesiastic see to a dynastic realm ruled by a Protestant prince challenged the principle of ecclesiastical reservation, which was intended to preserve the ecclesiastical electorates from this very possibility. The difficulties of such a conversion had been faced before: Hermann von Wied, a previous prince-elector and archbishop in Cologne, had also converted to Protestantism, but had resigned from his office. Similarly, Gebhard's predecessor, Salentin von Isenburg-Grenzau had indeed married in 1577, but had resigned from the office prior to his marriage. Furthermore, the reason for his marriage—to perpetuate his house—differed considerably from Gebhard's. The House of Waldburg was in no apparent danger of extinction; Gebhard was one of six brothers, and only one other had chosen an ecclesiastical career. Unlike his abdicating predecessors, when Gebhard converted, he proclaimed the Reformation in the city of Cologne itself, angering Cologne's Catholic leadership and alienating the Catholic faction in the Cathedral Chapter. Furthermore, Gebhard adhered not to the teachings of Martin Luther, but to those of John Calvin, a form of religious observation not approved by the Augsburg conventions of 1555. Finally, he made no move to resign from his position as Prince-elector.

Affairs became further complicated when, on 2 February 1583, also known as Candlemas, Gebhard married Agnes von Mansfeld-Eisleben in a private house in Rosenthal, outside of Bonn. After the ceremony, the couple processed to the Elector's palace in Bonn, and held a great feast. Unbeknownst to them, while they celebrated their marriage, Frederick, Duke of Saxe-Lauenburg, who was also a member of the Cathedral Chapter, and his soldiers approached the fortified Kaiserswerth, across the river, and took the castle after a brief fight. When the citizens of Cologne heard the news, there was a great public exultation.

Two days after his marriage, Gebhard invested his brother Karl with the duties of Statthalter (governor) and charged him with the rule of Bonn. He and Agnes then traveled to Zweibrücken and, from there, to the territory of Dillingen, near Solms-Braunfels, where the Count, a staunch supporter, would help him to raise funds and troops to hold the territory; Adolf, Count von Neuenahr returned to the Electorate to prepare for its defense.

Gebhard clearly intended to transform an important ecclesiastical territory into a secular, dynastic duchy. This problematic conversion would then bring the principle of cuius regio, eius religio into play in the Electorate. Under this principle, all of Gebhard's subjects would be required to convert to his faith: his rule, his religion. Furthermore, as a relatively young man, heirs would be expected. Gebhard and his young wife presented the very real possibility of successfully converting a rich, diplomatically important, and strategically placed ecclesiastical territory of a prince-prelate into a dynastic territory that carried with it one of the coveted offices of imperial elector.

Pope Gregory XIII excommunicated him in March 1583, and the Chapter deposed him, by electing in his place the 29-year-old canon, Ernst of Bavaria, brother of the pious William V, Duke of Bavaria. Ernst's election ensured the involvement of the powerful House of Wittelsbach in the coming contest.

== Course of the war ==
The war had three phases. Initially it was a localized feud between supporters of Gebhard and those of the Catholic core of the Cathedral Chapter. With the election of Ernst of Bavaria as a competing archbishop, what had been a local conflict expanded in scale: Ernst's election guaranteed the military, diplomatic, and financial interest of the Wittelsbach family in the Electorate of Cologne's local affairs. After the deaths of Louis VI, Elector Palatine in 1583 and William the Silent in 1584, the conflict shifted gears again, as the two evenly matched combatants sought outside assistance to break the stalemate. Finally, the intervention of Alexander Farnese, Duke of Parma, who had at his command the Spanish Army of Flanders, threw the balance of power in favor of the Catholic side. By 1588, Spanish forces had pushed Gebhard from the Electorate. In 1588 he took refuge in Strassburg, and the remaining Protestant strongholds of the Electorate fell to Parma's forces in 1589.

=== Cathedral feud ===
Although Gebhard had gathered some troops around him, he hoped to recruit support from the Lutheran princes. Unfortunately for him, he had converted to another branch of the Reformed faith; such cautious Lutheran princes as Augustus I, Elector of Saxony, balked at extending their military support to Calvinists and the Elector Palatine was unable to persuade them to join the cause. Gebhard had three primary supporters. His brother, Karl, had married Eleonore, Countess of Hohenzollern, and Gebhard could hope that this family alliance with the power-hungry Hohenzollerns would help his cause. Another long-time ally and supporter, Adolf, Count von Neuenahr, was a successful and cunning military commander whose army secured the northern part of the territory. Finally, John Casimir, the brother of the Elector Palatine, had expressed his support, and made a great show of force in the southern part of the Electorate.

In the first months after Gebhard's conversion, two competing armies rampaged throughout the southern portion of the Electoral territory in the destruction of the so-called Oberstift. Villages, abbeys and convents and several towns, were plundered and burned, by both sides; Linz am Rhein and Ahrweiler avoided destruction by swearing loyalty to Salentin. In the summer of 1583, Gebhard and Agnes took refuge, first at Vest in Vest Recklinghausen, a fief of the Electorate, and then in the Duchy of Westphalia, at Arensberg castle. In both territories, Gebhard set in motion as much of the Reformation as he could, although his soldiers indulged in a bout of iconoclasm and plundering.

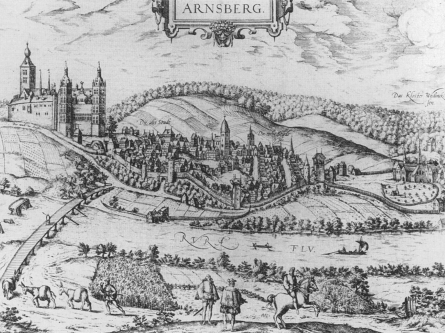
Arnsberg Castle, circa 1588. Gebhard lived there early in his reign as Elector, and sponsored the remaining reconstruction of the castle. During the Cathedral Feud, he and Agnes stayed there until 1584, when Ernst's army came too close, forcing them to flee to Delft.

Initially, despite a few setbacks, military action seemed to go in Gebhard's favor, until October 1583, when the Elector Palatine died, and Casimir disbanded his army and returned to his brother's court as guardian for the new duke, his 10-year-old nephew. In November 1583, from his castle Arensberg in Westphalia, he wrote to Francis Walsingham, adviser and spymaster to Queen Elizabeth: "Our needs are pressing, and you [Walsingham] and the Queen's other virtuous counsellors we believe can aid us; moreover, since God has called us to a knowledge of Himself, we have heard from our counsellors that you love and further the service of God."

On the same day, Gebhard wrote also to the Archbishop of Canterbury and the Bishop of London, presenting his case: "Verily, the Roman Antichrist moves every stone to oppress us and our churches...." Two days later, he wrote a more lengthy letter to the Queen: "We therefore humbly pray your Majesty to lend us 10,000 angelots, and to send it speedily, that we may preserve our churches this winter from the invasion of the enemy; for if we lost Bonn, they would be in the greatest danger, while if God permits us to keep it, we hope, by his grace, that Antichrist and his agents will be foiled in their damnable attempts against those who call upon the true God."

Godesburg, a fortress a few kilometers from the Elector's capital city of Bonn, was taken by storm in late 1583 after a brutal month-long siege; when Bavarian cannonades failed to break the bastions, sappers tunneled under the thick walls and blew up the fortifications from below. The Catholic Archbishop's forces still could not break through the remains of the fortifications, so they crawled through the garderobe sluices (hence the name, Sewer War). Upon taking the fortress, they killed every defender except four, a Captain of the Guard who could prove he was a citizen of Cologne, the son of an important Cologne politician, the commander, and his wife. The 5 mi (8 km) of road between Godesberg and Bonn was filled with so many troops that it looked like a military camp. At the same time, in one of the few set battles of the war, Gebhard's supporters won at Aalst (French: Alost) over the Catholic forces of the Frederick of Saxe-Lauenburg, who had raised his own army and had entered the fray of his own accord a few months earlier.

The Catholics offered Gebhard a great sum of money, which he refused, demanding instead, the restoration of his state. When further negotiations among the Electors and the Emperor at Frankfurt am Main, then at Mühlhausen, failed to reach an agreement settling the dispute, the Pope arranged for the support of several thousand Spanish troops in early 1584.

=== Engagement of outside military forces ===
The election of Ernst of Bavaria expanded the local feud into a more German-wide phenomenon. The pope committed 55,000 crowns to pay soldiers to fight for Ernst, and another 40,000 directly into the coffers of the new archbishop. Under the command of his brother, Ernst's forces pushed their way into Westphalia, threatening Gebhard and Agnes at their stronghold at Arensburg. Gebhard and Agnes escaped to the rebellious provinces of the Netherlands with almost 1000 cavalry, where Prince William gave them a haven in Delft. There, Gebhard solicited the impecunious William for troops and money. After William's assassination in July 1584, Gebhard wrote to Queen Elizabeth requesting assistance. Elizabeth responded toward the end of 1585, directing him to contact Robert Dudley, 1st Earl of Leicester, her deputy with the rebellious Dutch, and recently commissioned as the commander-in-chief of her army in the Netherlands. Elizabeth had her own problems with adherents of her cousin Mary, Queen of Scots, and the Spanish.

=== Stalemate ===
By late 1585, although Ernst's brother had made significant inroads into the Electorate of Cologne, both sides had reached an impasse. Sizable portions of the population subscribed to the Calvinist doctrine; to support them, Calvinist Switzerland and Strassburg furnished a steady stream of theologians, jurists, books, and ideas. The Calvinist barons and counts understood the danger of Spanish intervention: it meant the aggressive introduction of the Counter-Reformation in their territories. France, in the person of Henry III, was equally interested, since the encirclement of his Kingdom by Habsburgs was cause for concern. Another sizable portion of the electorate's populace adhered to the old faith, supported by Wittelsbach-funded Jesuits. The supporters of both sides committed atrocities of their own: in the city of Cologne, the mere rumor of Gebhard's approaching army caused rioters to murder several people suspected of sympathizing with the Protestant cause.

Ernst depended on his brother and the Catholic barons in the Cathedral Chapter to hold the territory he acquired. In 1585, Münster, Paderborn, and Osnabrück succumbed to Ferdinand's energetic pursuit in the eastern regions of the electorate, and a short time later, Minden. With their help, Ernst could hold Bonn. Support from the city of Cologne itself was also secure. To oust Gebhard, though, Ernst ultimately had to appeal for aid to Alexander Farnese, Duke of Parma, who commanded Spanish forces in the Netherlands, namely the Army of Flanders.

Parma was more than willing to help. The Electorate, strategically important to Spain, offered another land route by which to approach the rebellious northern Provinces of the Netherlands. Although the Spanish road from Spain's holdings on the Mediterranean shores led to its territories in what is today Belgium, it was a long, arduous march, complicated by the provisioning of troops and the potentially hostile populations of the territories through which it passed. An alternative route on the Rhine promised better access to the Habsburg Netherlands. Furthermore, the presence of a Calvinist electorate almost on the Dutch border could delay their efforts to bring the rebellious Dutch back to the Spanish rule and the Catholic confession. Philip II and his generals could be convinced to support Ernst's cause for such considerations. Indeed, the process of intervention had started earlier. In 1581, Philip's forces, paid for by papal gold, had taken Aachen, which Protestants had seized; by the mid–1580s, the Duke of Parma's forces, encouraged by the Wittelsbachs and the Catholics in Cologne, had secured garrisons throughout the northern territories of the Electorate. By 1590, these garrisons gave Spain access to the northern provinces and Philip felt comfortable enough with his military access to the provinces, and with their isolation from possible support by German Protestants, to direct more of his attention to France, and less to his problems with the Dutch.

On the other side of the feud, to hold the territory, Gebhard needed the full support of his military brother and the very able Neuenahr. To push Ernst out, he needed additional support, which he had requested from Delft and from England. It was clearly in the interests of England and the Dutch to offer assistance; if the Dutch could not tie up the Spanish army in Flanders, and if that army needed a navy to supply it, Philip could not focus his attention on the English and the French. His own diplomats had sought to present his case as one of pressing concern to all Protestant princes: in November 1583, one of his advisers, Dr. Wenceslaus Zuleger, wrote to Francis Walsingham: "I assure you if the Elector of Cologne is not assisted, you will see that the war in the Low Countries will shortly spread over the whole of Germany." The support Gebhard received, in the form of troops from the Earl of Leicester, and from the Dutch, in the form of the mercenary Martin Schenck, had mixed results. Leicester's troops, professional and well-led, performed well but their usefulness was limited: Elizabeth's instructions to help Gebhard had not come with financial support and Leicester had sold his own plate and had exhausted his own personal credit while trying to field an army. Martin Schenck had seen considerable service in Spain's Army of Flanders, for the French king and for Parma himself. He was a skilled and charismatic soldier, and his men would do anything for him; reportedly, he could sleep in his saddle, and seemed indomitable in the field. Unfortunately, Schenck was little more than a land-pirate, a free-booter, and rascal, and ultimately he did Gebhard more harm than good, as his behavior in Westphalia and at the Battle of Werl demonstrated.

==== Sack of Westphalia ====
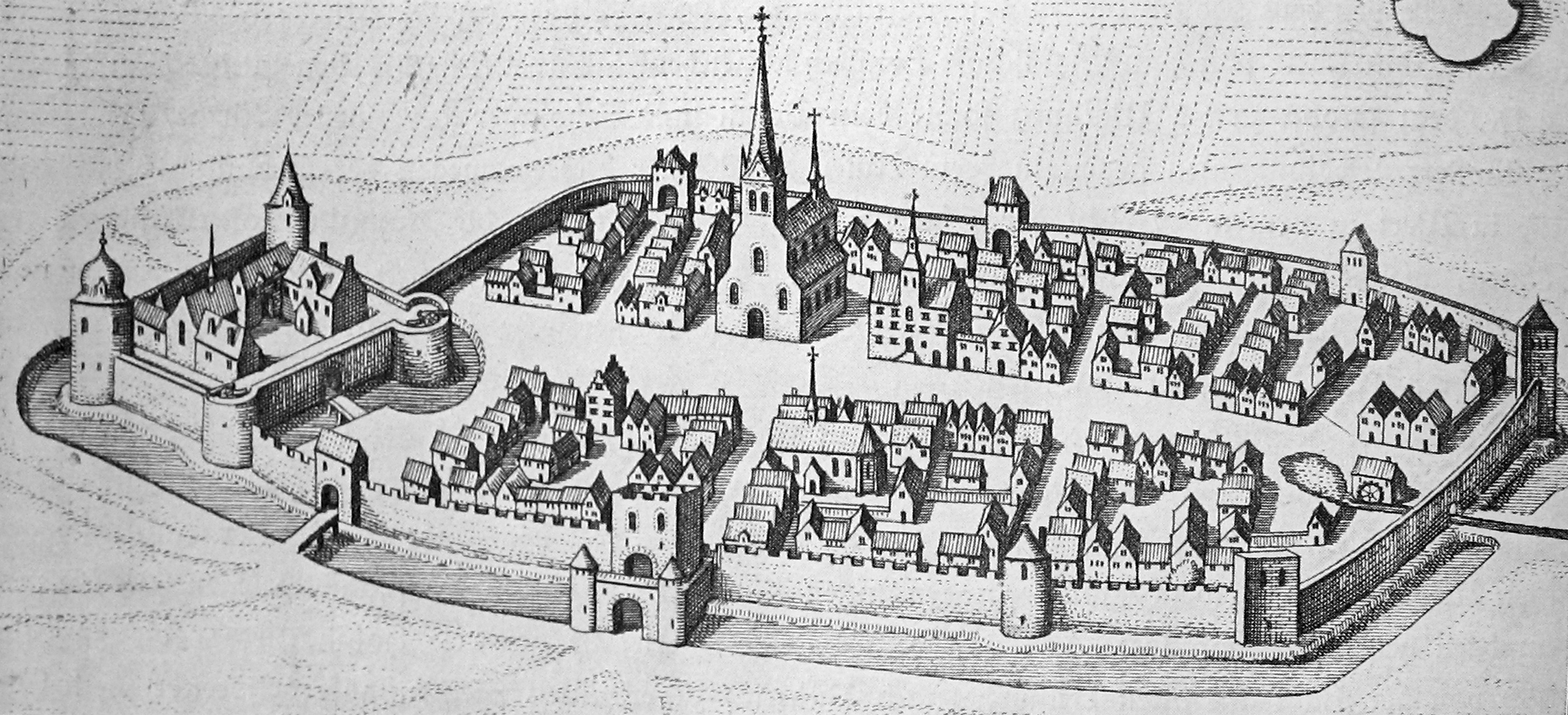
Cloedt and Schenck captured the well-fortified City of Werl through a "salty" stratagem: they hid several well-armed soldiers in a wagon and covered the men with salt, in a 16th-century version of the Trojan Horse.

In late February 1586, Friedrich Cloedt, whom Gebhard had placed in command of Neuss, and Martin Schenck went to Westphalia at the head of 500 foot and 500 horse. After plundering Vest Recklinghausen, on 1 March they captured Werl through trickery. They loaded a train of wagons with soldiers and covered them with salt. When the wagons of salt were seen outside the city gates, they were immediately admitted, salt being a valued commodity. The "salted soldiers" then over-powered the guard and captured the town. Some of the defenders escaped to the citadel, and could not be dislodged. Claude de Berlaymont, also known as Haultpenne after the name of his castle, collected his own force of 4000 and besieged Schenck and Cloedt in Werl. Attacked from the outside by Haultpenne, and from the inside by the soldiers in the citadel, Schenck and Cloedt broke out of the city with their soldiers on 3 March. Unable to break through the lines, they retreated into the city once more, but several of their soldiers did not make it into the city, and plundered the neighboring villages; 250 local residents were killed. On 8 March, Schenck and Cloedt loaded their wagons, this time with booty, took 30 magistrates as hostages, and attacked Haultpenne's force, killing about 500 of them, and losing 200 of their own. Included in the hostages were the Bürgermeister Johann von Pappen and several other high-ranking officials; although von Pappen died during the retreat, the remaining hostages were released after the payment of a high ransom. Schenck retreated to Venlo and Cloedt returned to the city of Neuss.

=== Spanish intervention ===
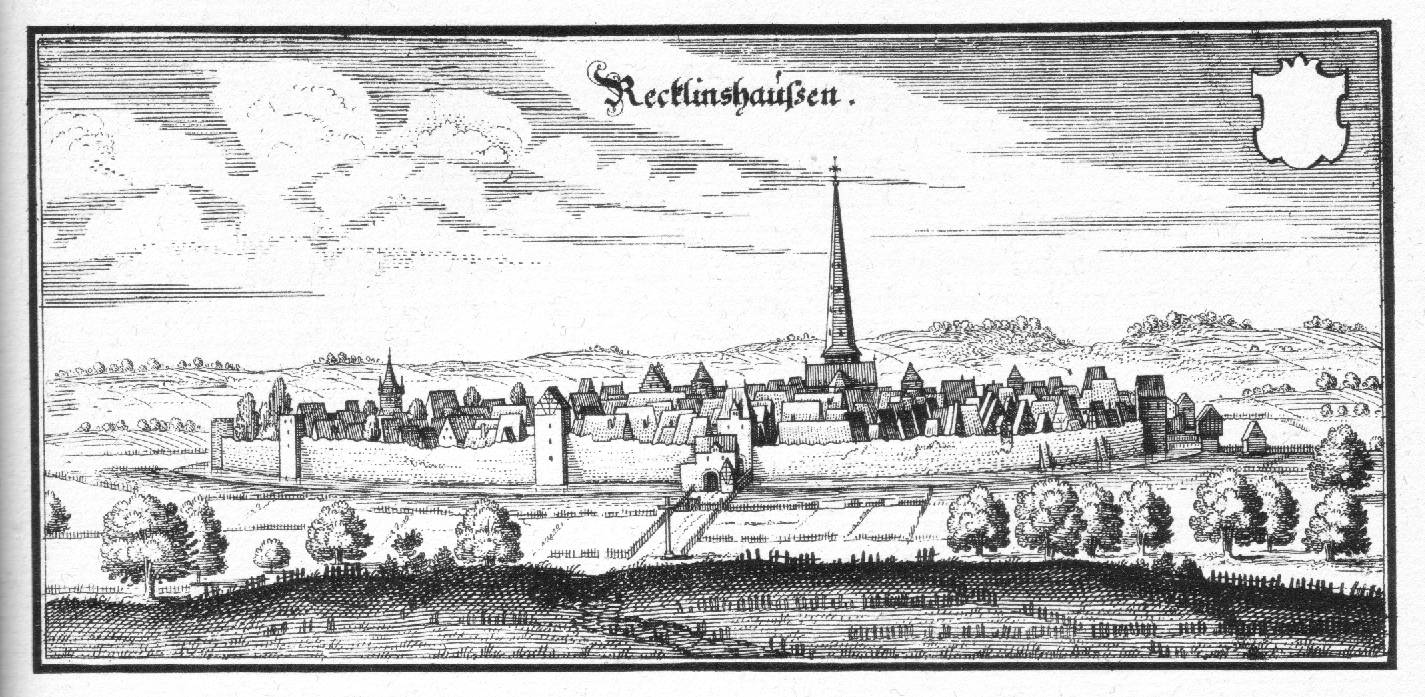
Martin Schenck and Friedrich Cloedt plundered Recklinghausen in late spring, 1586.

To some extent, the difficulties both Gebhard and Ernst faced in winning the war were the same the Spanish had in subduing the Dutch Revolt. The protraction of the Spanish and Dutch war—80 years of bitter fighting interrupted by periodic truces while both sides gathered resources—lay in the kind of war it was: enemies lived in fortified towns defended by Italian-style bastions, which meant the towns had to be taken and then fortified and maintained. For both Gebhard and Ernst, as for the Spanish commanders in the nearby Lowlands, winning the war meant not only mobilizing enough men to encircle a seemingly endless cycle of enemy artillery fortresses, but also maintaining the army one had and defending all one's own possessions as they were acquired. The Cologne War, similar to the Dutch Revolt in that respect, was also a war of sieges, not of assembled armies facing one another on the field of battle, nor of maneuver, feint, and parry that characterized wars two centuries earlier and later. These wars required men who could operate the machinery of war, which meant extensive economic resources for soldiers to build and operate the siege works, and a political and military will to keep the machinery of war operating. The Spanish faced another problem, distance, which gave them a distinct interest in intervening in the Cologne affair: the Electorate lay on the Rhine River, and the Spanish road.

==== Razing of Neuss ====
Gebhard's supporter, Adolf von Neuenahr, surrounded Neuss in March 1586, and persuaded Ernst's small garrison to capitulate. He refortified and restocked the city and placed young Friedrich Cloedt in command of a garrison of 1600 men, mostly Germans and Dutch soldiers. The town's fortifications were substantial; 100 years earlier it had resisted a lengthy siege by Charles the Bold of Burgundy, and between the fortifications, the natural defenses of rivers, and the garrison, it could withstand all but the most determined assaults. In July 1586, the Duke of Parma approached and surrounded the city; by some irony, Agnes' cousin, Karl von Mansfeld and his troops were a part of the Spanish force assembled against Neuss. Parma had an impressive force at his command; in addition to Mansfeld's 2000 troops, he had another 6000 or so foot and Tercios, 2000 well-mounted, experienced Italian, Spanish, and German soldiers, and some 45 cannons, which he distributed on the redoubt across the river and on the heights a short distance from the city walls. According to the protocols of war generally accepted in 1586, Parma requested the capitulation of the city prior to the cannonade. Cloedt declined to capitulate, politely. The next day, being the feast of St. James, and the patron day for the Spanish, the bombardment was not initiated, although mendacious reports circulated in the Spanish camp that the Protestants had roasted two Spanish soldiers alive on the Catholic Holy day, a desecration which fanned their enthusiasm for the impending battle.

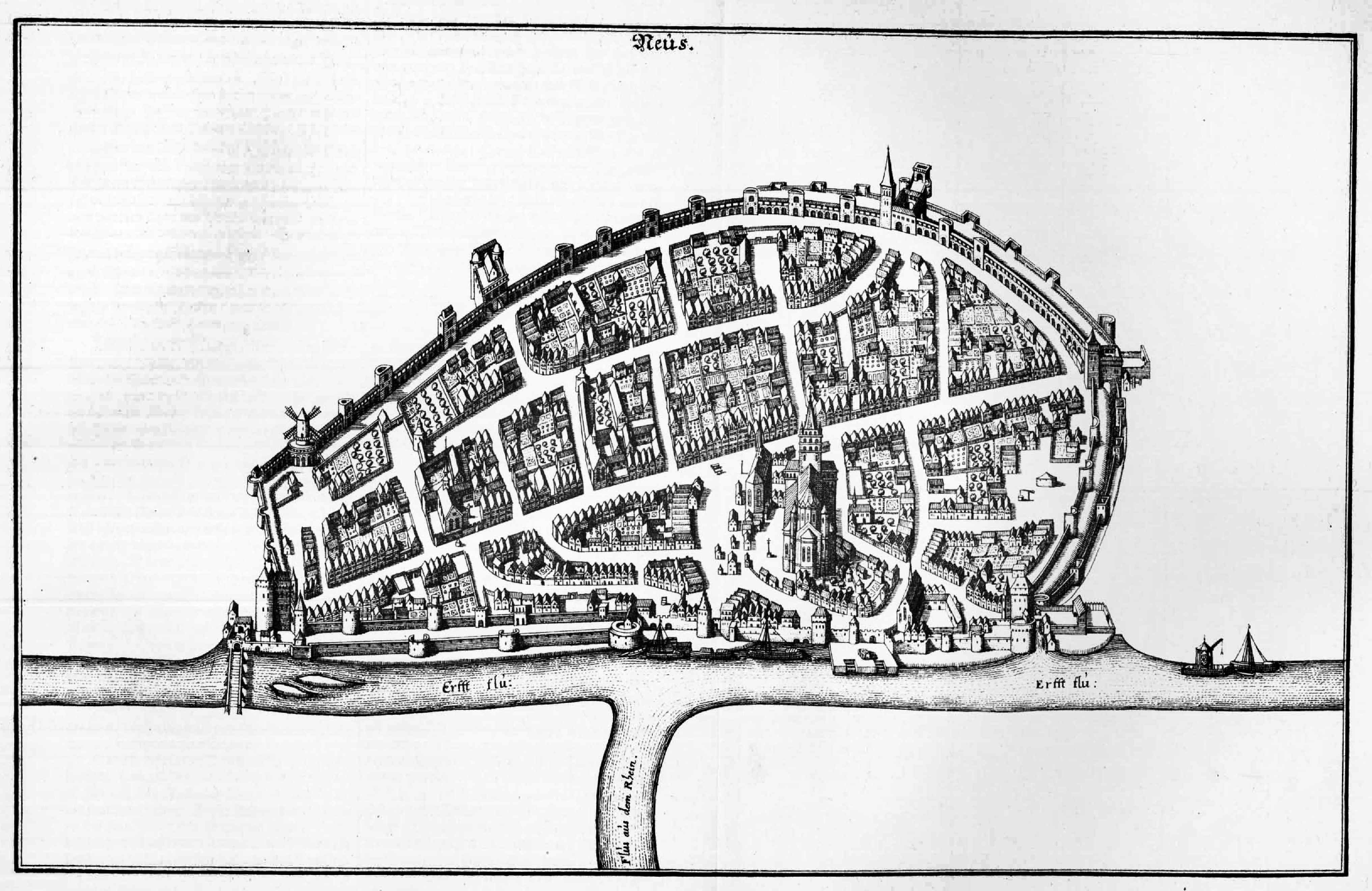
Engraved map of the city of Neuss, showing the wide streets leading from gate to gate; the soldiers entered at each gate. After house-to-house fighting, they reached the market, where they found Cloedt and hanged him from a window.

The following day, Parma's artillery pounded at the walls for 3 hours with iron cannonballs weighing 30–50 pounds; in total, his artillery fired more than 2700 rounds. The Spanish made several attempts to storm the city, each repelled by Cloedt's 1600 soldiers. The ninth assault breached the outer wall. The Spanish and Italian forces entered the town from opposite ends and met in the middle. Cloedt, gravely injured (his leg was reportedly almost ripped off and he had five other serious wounds), had been carried into the town. Parma's troops discovered Cloedt, being nursed by his wife and his sister. Although Parma was inclined to honor the garrison commander with a soldier's death by sword, Ernst demanded his immediate execution. The dying man was hanged from the window, with several other officers in his force.

Parma made no effort to restrain his soldiers. On their rampage through the city, Italian and Spanish soldiers slaughtered the rest of the garrison, even the men who tried to surrender. Once their blood-lust was satiated, they began to plunder. Civilians who had taken refuge in the churches were initially ignored, but when the fire started, they were forced into the streets and trapped by the rampaging soldiers. Contemporary accounts refer to children, women, and old men, their clothes smoldering, or in flames, trying to escape the conflagration, only to be trapped by the enraged Spanish; if they escaped the flames and the Spanish, they were cornered by the enraged Italians. Parma wrote to King Philip that over 4000 lay dead in the ditches (moats). English observers confirmed this report, and elaborated that only eight buildings remained standing.

=== Siege warfare runs its course ===
Parma had gone to Neuss prepared for a major assault, and the resources of Spain's Army of the Netherlands quickly changed the balance in favor of Ernst. In 1586, Ernst's allies had secured Vest Recklinghausen, even though they had failed to catch the elusive Schenck, and they had reduced Neuss to a pile of rubble, proving their overwhelming fire-power. In 1587, they encircled and took the fortified towns in the Oberstift, recapturing Bonn, Godesberg, and Linz am Rhein, and dozens of smaller fortified towns, villages, and farmsteads throughout the countryside. Throughout, soldiers from both parties marauded and plundered throughout the countryside, searching either for important officials, booty, or other valuables. On 12 November 1587, one of Walsingham's informants wrote, the "soldiers of Vartendonc (Martin Schenck) go out daily on excursions, doing very great harm in all places, for they have free passage every where. The other evening they went with 180 horse to above Bonn, between Orchel and Linz (am Rhein), to make prisoner Count Salatin d'Issemburg (Salentin von Isenburg), but their design did not succeed, as he withdrew into a castle." In early 1588, Gebhardt's supporters once more acquired Bonn; one of Walsingham's observers in the Palatinate, in Heidelberg, reported that the Prince of Taxis had been slain outside of Bonn, with 300 Spanish soldiers.

By Spring 1588, Gebhard had run out of options. In 1583, he had refused the settlement offered to him after the conferences at Frankfurt and in Westphalia, counting on the support of the other Protestant electors. When their support did not materialize, he pursued diplomatic options with the French, the Dutch, and the English; these also were of limited help. After the destruction of Neuss in 1586, and the loss of most of the southern part of the Electorate in 1587, Rheinberg and its environs were the only territories of the Electorate he could claim, and much of this slipped from his grasp in 1588. He had exhausted his diplomatic, financial, and military possibilities. His health problems (referred to as Gelenkenschmerz, or joint pain) prohibited him from riding, which limited his ability to travel. In the spring of 1588, he relinquished his claim on the Electorate to the protection of Neuenahr and Martin Schenck, and retired to Strassburg. Neuenahr and Schenck continued to fight for him, but the former died in an artillery explosion in 1589, and the latter was killed at Nijmegen that summer. Without them to defend his claim on the Electorate, Rheinberg, Gebhard's last outpost in the northern Electorate, fell to Parma's force in 1589.

== Aftermath ==
After Gebhard's expulsion, Ernst assumed full charge of the Electorate of Cologne. In his later years, a nuncio at Cologne took responsibilities for the financial administration of the archdiocese, and Ernst's nephew, Ferdinand of Bavaria, was elected to the Cathedral Chapter, the Wittelsbach heir-apparent. When Ernst died in 1612, the Cathedral Chapter duly elected his nephew to the position and Wittelsbachs held the Electorate until 1761. Ernst's victory, both in winning the election in 1583, and in convincing the assembly of other electors to accept him in 1585, confirmed him as the new archbishop of Cologne and gave the Wittelsbach family a foothold on the northern Rhine.

Ernst's rule, and that of his four Wittelsbach successors, strengthened the position of his family in Imperial politics. The victory of the Catholic party further consolidated the Counter-Reformation in the northwest territories of the Holy Roman Empire, especially in the bishoprics of Münster, Paderborn, Osnabrück, and Minden, which were bordered by Protestant territories. Once Ernst's brother or such allies as the Duke of Parma regained control, Jesuits efficiently identified any recalcitrant Protestants and converted them to Catholicism. The Counter-Reformation was thoroughly applied in the lower Rhineland, with the goal that every Protestant, whether Lutheran or Calvinist, would be brought to the Catholic fold. For their efforts, the Spanish acquired important bridgeheads on the Rhine River, securing a land route to the rebellious northern provinces, which helped to extend an already long war of secession well into the next century.

The German tradition of local and regional autonomy differed structurally and culturally from the increasingly centralized authority of such other European states as France, England, and Spain. This difference made them vulnerable to the unabashed intervention of Spanish, French, Italian, Dutch, English, and Scots mercenaries and the influence of papal gold and changed the dynamic of internal German confessional and dynastic disputes. The great "players" of the Early Modern European political stage realized that they could enhance their own positions vis-a-vis one another by assisting, promoting, or undermining local and regional competition among the German princes, as they did in the localized feud between Gebhard and Ernst. Conversely, German princes, dukes, and counts realized that they could gain an edge over their competitors by promoting the interests of powerful neighbors. The scale of the engagement of such external mercenary armies as Spain's Army of Flanders set a precedent to internationalize contests of local autonomy and religious issues in the German states, a problem not settled until the Peace of Westphalia in 1648. Even after that settlement, German states remained vulnerable to both external intervention and the religious division exemplified in the Cologne war.
