= Agnes von Mansfeld-Eisleben =

Countess of Mansfeld and husband of Gebhard von Waldburg

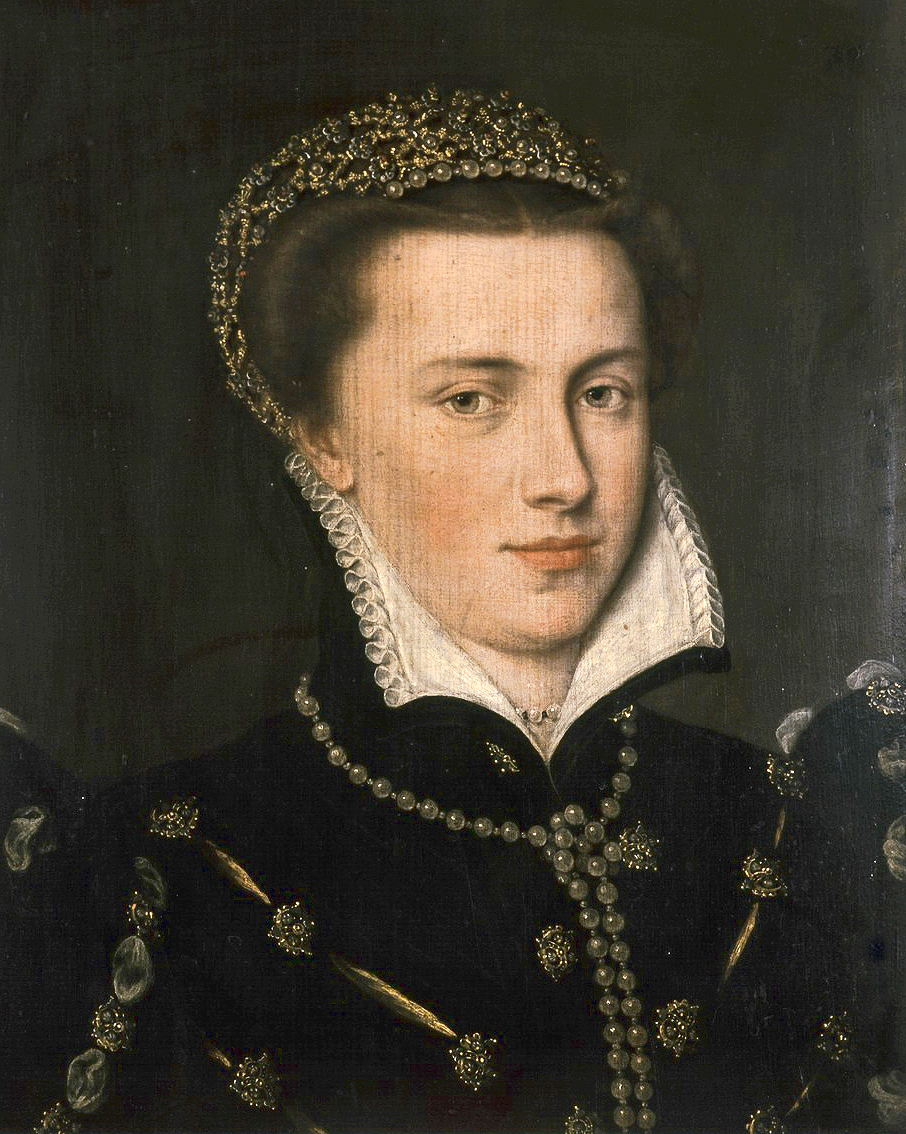
- Born: 1551; Mansfeld, County of Mansfeld, Holy Roman Empire
- Died: 1637 (aged 85–86); Sulzbach
- Occupation: Calvinist canoness (even though she was herself from a Lutheran background)
- Known for: Her marriage to the archbishop of the Diocese of Cologne triggered the Cologne War
- Spouse: Gebhard Truchsess von Waldburg, Elector of Cologne
- Parent(s): Johann (Hans) Georg I, of Mansfeld-Eisleben; Katharina of Mansfeld-Hinterort
- Family: Karl von Mansfeld (cousin)

Agnes von Mansfeld-Eisleben (1551–1637) was Countess of Mansfeld and the daughter of Johann (Hans) Georg I, of Mansfeld Eisleben. She converted Gebhard, Seneschal of Waldburg, the Prince-Elector of Electorate of Cologne and archbishop of the Diocese of Cologne to the Protestant faith, leading to the Cologne War (1583–1588).

After a multi-year odyssey in which she and her husband sought refuge in several parts of northern Germany, Gebhard relinquished his claim on the Electorate. They settled in Strassbourg, where he had retained a position in the Cathedral chapter. After his death in 1601, she came under the protection of the Duke of Wūrttemberg, who had himself been chased from his duchy. She died in 1637.

== Affair ==
Agnes was the daughter of Johann (Hans) Georg I, of Mansfeld Eisleben and his wife, Katharina of Mansfeld-Hinterort. Although born and raised in the town of Mansfeld, in Saxony, as an adult, Agnes von Mansfeld Eisleben became a Protestant canoness at a cloister in Gerresheim, today a district of Düsseldorf. Agnes' sister Sibilla lived in the city of Cologne, having married to the Freiherr (baron) Peter von Kriechingen; although a member of the cloister, Agnes was not bound to it and was free during her days to move about the city. She visited Sibilla one day, and was noticed by the Elector of Cologne, Gebhard, Truchsess von Waldburg. Reportedly a beautiful woman (she was also known as the "lovely Mansfeld girl"), she was sought out by him, and they started a liaison. Two of her brothers, Hoyer and Ernst, visited Gebhard at the archbishop's palace in the electoral capital of Bonn, and convinced him to marry her.

She insisted Gebhard first convert to Calvinism. The difficulties of a conversion by a Catholic Archbishop and Prince-elector of the Holy Roman Empire had been faced before: Hermann von Wied had also converted to Protestantism, and had resigned from his office. Similarly, Gebhard's immediate predecessor, Salentin IX of Isenburg-Grenzau had resigned to marry when it appeared his family line would become extinct. Initially, it appeared that Gebhard would resign. However, several of his associates in the Cathedral chapter convinced him that he could have the lady and the Electorate. Before Christmas in 1582, he proclaimed the Reformation from the pulpit in Cologne, establishing Protestantism on parity with Catholicism in the archdiocese.

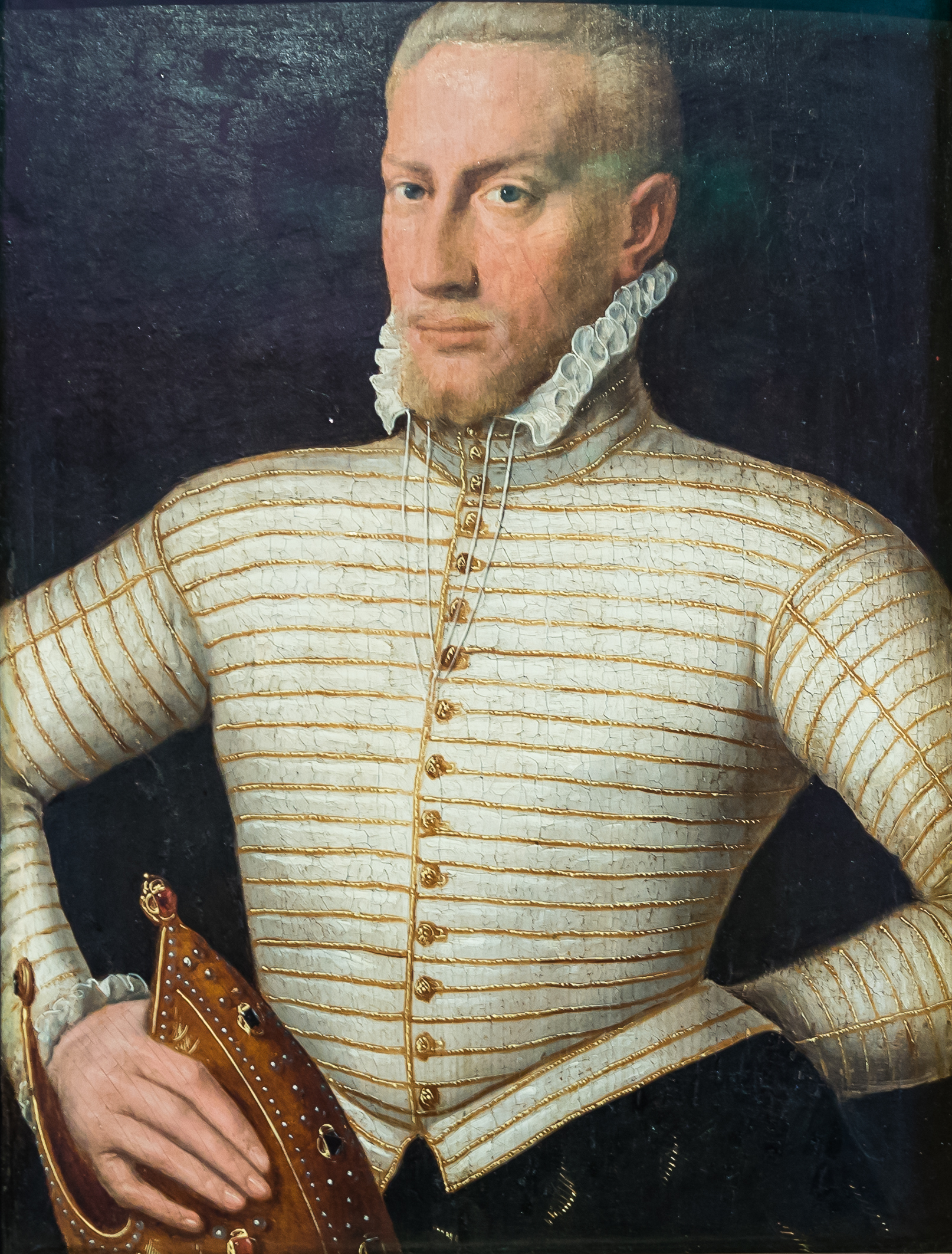
Gebhard, the Prince Elector and Archbishop of Cologne

This declaration of parity between Protestantism and Catholics in an electoral territory contravened the Religious Peace of Augsburg established in 1555. In this document, to which all the Estates of the Holy Roman Empire agreed, confirmed the co-existence of Lutheranism and Catholicism in select polities were both denominations were already established; in all other regions, the principle of Cuius regio, eius religio (loosely translated from Latin as "Whose realm, his religion") confirmed the religion of the reigning sovereign to be the religion of his subjects. Any other Christian religious practice, such as Calvinism, was considered heresy.

=== Unlikely match ===
Gebhard's conversion under the influence of Agnes caused more than a ripple of scandal in the aristocratic circles of the Holy Roman Empire. Descended as he was from the hereditary seneschals of Waldburg, Gebhard came from a line of stalwart Catholic defenders of what was considered the universal faith. One of his uncles was the bishop of Augsburg; his grandfather's brother had been a general in the German Peasants' War of 1525 and instrumental in the destruction of the German Peasant army. The family had been long-time supporters of Habsburg dynastic aspirations and policies, and key advisers for in the often-troubled Imperial relationships with the Swabian Imperial circle (Kreis). Gebhard himself had been raised in a Catholic tradition, and strongly influenced by the Jesuits in his education. His career had been solely focused on obtaining a preferential position in the ecclesiastical hierarchy, and his election as the archbishop of Cologne, in a close contest with the equally-qualified Wittelsbach candidate, attested not to the diligence and application of his personal faith, but his family's Imperial influence.

On the other side of the relationship, Agnes came from a family of dedicated Lutherans; the town in which she was born and raised, and whose name she bore, Eisleben, was also Martin Luther's home town. Her father and her uncles had been signatories of the Book of Concord, established in 1580 as the doctrinal standard of the Lutheran faith. Luther himself had negotiated a settlement to a disagreement between her uncles and her brothers over inheritance and succession issues. Her placement in the religious community at Gerresheim was a factor of her nobility and her family's connections; although she came from the impoverished side of the old Mansfeld house, her family continued to wield influence in Imperial, Saxon, and religious circles, although it is unclear why she was placed in a Calvinist convent.

The marriage of this seeming unlikely pair caused a scandal throughout the Empire. At 27-years-of-age, Gebhard had apparently abjured the matrimonial life in his acceptance of the church career often reserved for a second or third son of noble families. If he had converted to Lutheranism and resigned from his electoral and episcopal responsibilities, the marriage might have made a ripple in social circles, but his refusal to give up his electoral and episcopal responsibilities, his declaration of the electorate as henceforth a dynastic property, however, made his marriage of utmost political importance. Furthermore, his conversion to Calvinism was heresy, because Calvinism was not one of the two legal professions of faith accepted by the Peace of Augsburg in 1556.

== War ==
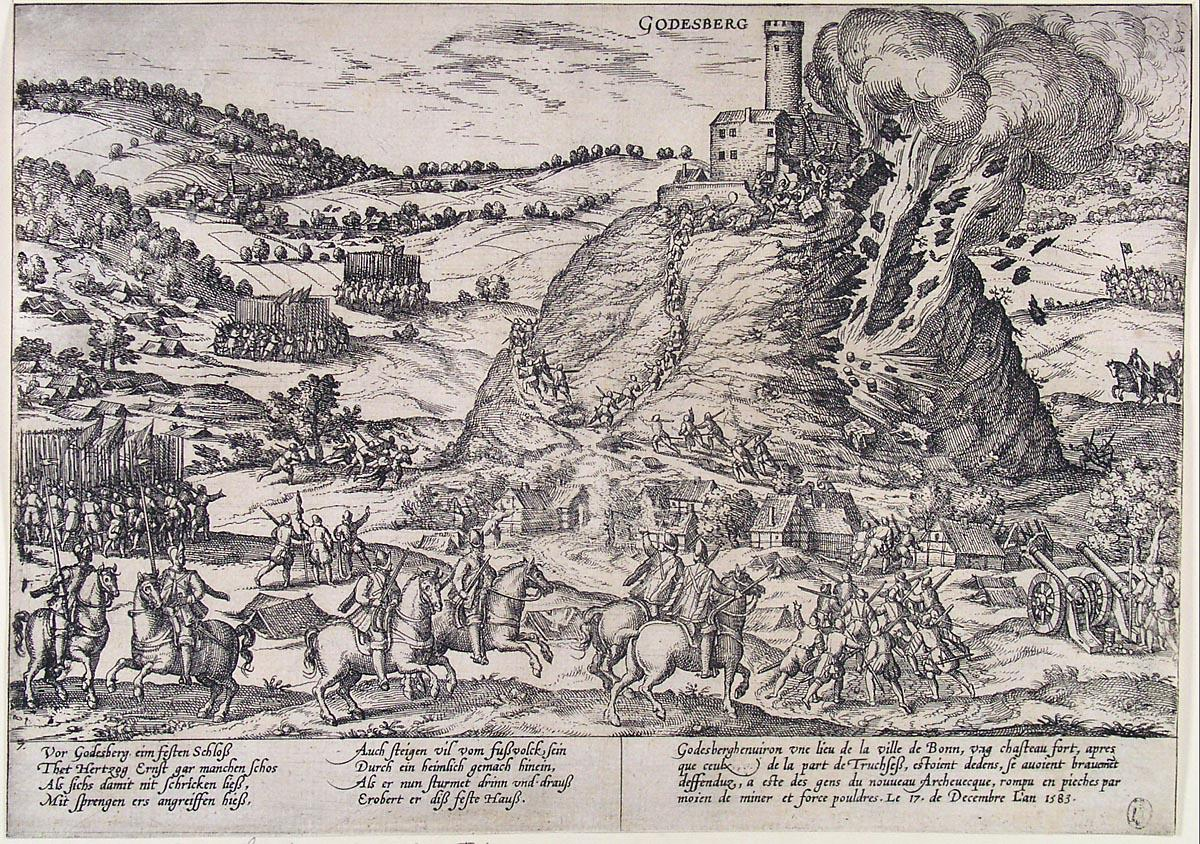
Destruction of the fortress above the village of Godesberg during the Cologne War 1583; the walls were breached by mines, and most of the defenders were put to death. Engraved by Franss Hogenberg, a Dutch engraver and artist of the 16th century.

News of the pending marriage became public in late November 1582, but it was still unclear what Gebhard would do. Precedent suggested he would resign prior to his marriage, but rumors abounded that he would convert the Electorate to Protestantism, perhaps forcibly. Throughout the Electorate, and on its borders, his supporters and opponents gathered their troops, armed their garrisons, stockpiled food, and prepared for war. On 19 December 1582, Gebhard announced his conversion, from, as he phrased it, the "darkness of the papacy to the Light" of the Word of God. His proclamation of the Reformation from the Cathedral pulpit in the Imperial City of Cologne established Calvinism as a religious option in the Electorate. He also intended to convert the electorate into a dynastic property generated an uproar among the other Prince-electors. The transformation of an important ecclesiastical territory into a secular, dynastic duchy would then bring the principle of cuius regio, eius religio into play in the Electorate. Under this principle, all of Gebhard's subjects would be required to convert to his faith: his rule, his religion.

The conversion of the Archbishop of Cologne to Protestantism also triggered religious and political repercussions throughout the Holy Roman Empire. Gebhard's conversion had widespread implications for the future of the Holy Roman Empire's electoral process, established by the Golden Bull of 1356. The council continued for more than a year, and eventually moved to other cities; although several times they seemed close to negotiating a conclusion to the crisis, a successful agreement remained beyond their reach. They also offered Gebhard a sum of money to relinquish his claim, which he refused on the high moral grounds of religious principle.

Agnes and Gebhard married on 2 February 1583 in Bonn and retired to the Elector's country seat in Poppelsdorf to celebrate their nuptials. Within weeks, the Cathedral chapter had deposed Gebhard, electing in his place an old opponent, Ernst of Bavaria, the brother of Wilhelm V, Duke of Bavaria, who immediately set about raising an army with the help of his brother the duke, and his second brother, Ferdinand of Bavaria. In the spring and summer, Agnes and Gebhard did likewise, traveling to different parts of the electorate, raising an army, and extending the Protestant cause. By October, Ernst's brother Ferdinand entered the electorate from the south, near Koblenz. In their northward progress, they left a path of fire and destruction. Agnes and Gebhard fled, as Poppelsdorf, then Godesberg, and later the capital city of the electorate, Bonn, were over-run and destroyed.

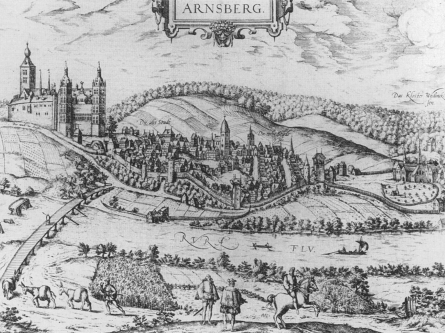
Arnsberg Castle, circa 1588. Agnes and Gebhardt fled to the castle when the war began.

Initially, the couple fled to Vest Recklinghausen, a fiefdom of the Electorate. There, Agnes and Gebhard encouraged an outbreak of iconoclasm that destroyed many well-known and beloved religious sites; the Reformation had already been wrought in Vest and Recklinghausen, and many of the inhabitants had converted to the new faith. The burst of iconoclastic energy, indulged predominantly by Gebhard's troops and not by the inhabitants themselves, alienated the residents from Gebhard, his wife, and their cause. With local support, Catholic armies chased the couple from Vest Recklinghausen later in the year. Gebhard and Agnes escaped with approximately 1000 cavalry and some infantry.

A multiple year odyssey followed, as Agnes and her husband sought refuge in the northern territories of the Electorate at the castle Arensberg, and later at the city of Delft, with William I of Orange. Living in the Netherlands, they became acquainted with Elizabeth's envoy, Robert Dudley, 1st Earl of Leicester, and entered into lengthy negotiations with Elizabeth's Court to obtain support for Gebhard's cause; these efforts failed to garner assistance for renewing the war either from the English queen or in any other quarter. In 1585, Agnes reportedly traveled to England in a futile effort to seek assistance from Elizabeth I, but this claim has been refuted by modern scholars.

After his once prosperous electorate was ruined by war, Gebhard relinquished his claim on it in 1588 to Ernst of Bavaria, who had recruited the assistance of the powerful Alexander Farnese, Duke of Parma. By some twist of fate, her first cousin, Karl von Mansfeld, was in the service of the Duke of Parma at the Destruction of Neuss, a critical battle that turned the tide of war against her husband.

== Peace in Strasbourg ==
In 1589, they could not return to the Electorate territories, which her husband had relinquished, nor could she, a married lady, return to the convent at Gerresheim. They sought refuge in Strasbourg, a stronghold of the Reformation. Gebhard had been a member of the Cathedral Chapter there since 1576. Three other canons from Cologne had also taken refuge in Strasbourg after 1583. Shortly after their marriage in 1583, Gebhard had written his Testament in which he left his estate to his brother, Karl, and a life-time annuity to Agnes, and charged Karl with her safety and protection. Karl died on 18 June 1593, and was buried in the Strasbourg cathedral; Gebhard wrote a codicil leaving Agnes to the care and protection of the Dukes of Württemberg.

Gebhard died on 21 May 1601. Until her death in 1637, she lived under the protection of the Dukes, first Friedrich I, later Johann Friedrich and then his son Eberhard. She was buried in Sulzbach.

== Cultural references ==
The life of Agnes and her romantic union with Gebhard became a theme for diverse story tellers and novelists, and is today still a resource of historical novelists.

=== Literature ===
- Rafaela Matzigkeit, Schön, fromm, sittsam, tugendhaft... Agnes von Mansfeld im Spiegel der Geschichte und Literatur (Beautiful, pious, modest and chaste, Agnes von Mansfeld in the history and literature). In: Rund um den Quadenhof (Düsseldorf-Gerresheim) 47 (1996), S. 9–17 und S. 17–23.
- Johann Baptist Durach, Gebhard der Zweite, Kurfürst von Köln, und Agnes von Mannsfeld, Kanonissinn von Girrisheim. Eine Bischofslegende aus dem sechszehnten Jahrhundert (Gebhard the Second, Elector of Cologne, and Agnes of Mansfeld, Canoness of Gerresheim, A bishop's legend from the 16th century). Geb. Hochleiter und Komp., Wien und Leipzig 1791.
- Christoph Sigismund Grüner, Gebhard, Churfürst von Cöln, und seine schöne Agnes (Gebhard, Elector of Cologne, and his beautiful Agnes) Ursache und Veranlassung des gestörten Religionsfriedens, der Union und des dreißigjährigen Krieges. Eine historisch-romantische Ausstellung, frei, nach geschichtlichen Quellen, Goebbels und Unzer, Königsberg 1806.
- Carl August Gottlieb Seidel, Die unglückliche Constellation oder Gräfin Agnes von Mannsfeld. Eine Sage aus der zweiten Hälfte des sechzehnten Jahrhunderts, (The Unfortunate Constellation, or the Countess of Mansfeld, a story of the second half of the 16th century.) Supprian, Leipzig 1796.
- Eugenie Tafel: Gräfin Agnes aus dem Hause Mansfeld. Erzählung aus dem 16. Jahrhundert, (Countess Agnes of the House of Mansfeld, Tales of the 16th century), Schloeßmann, Gotha 1897.

== Genealogy ==
Father: Johann Georg I of Mansfeld-Eisleben

Mother: Katharina of Mansfeld-Hinterort

Children:

1. Count Ernst IV of Mansfeld-Eisleben (b.13 January 1544)
2. Princess Maria of Mansfeld-Eisleben (b.3/12/1545)
3. Count Hoyer of Mansfeld-Eisleben (b.1546)
4. Count Peter of Mansfeld-Eisleben (b.1548)
5. Count Philipp of Mansfeld-Eisleben (b.1550)
6. Princess Agnes of Mansfeld-Eisleben (b.1551)
7. Princess Anna of Mansfeld-Eisleben (b.1552)
8. Princess Catharina of Mansfeld-Eisleben (b.1554)
9. Princess Dorothea of Mansfeld-Eisleben (b.1555)
10. Princess Esther of Mansfeld-Eisleben (b.1556)
11. Princess Sibilla of Mansfeld-Eisleben (b.1557)
12. Count Jobst of Mansfeld-Eisleben (b.14 April 1558)
