= Adolf van Nieuwenaar =

Dutch statesman and soldier (c. 1545 – 1589)

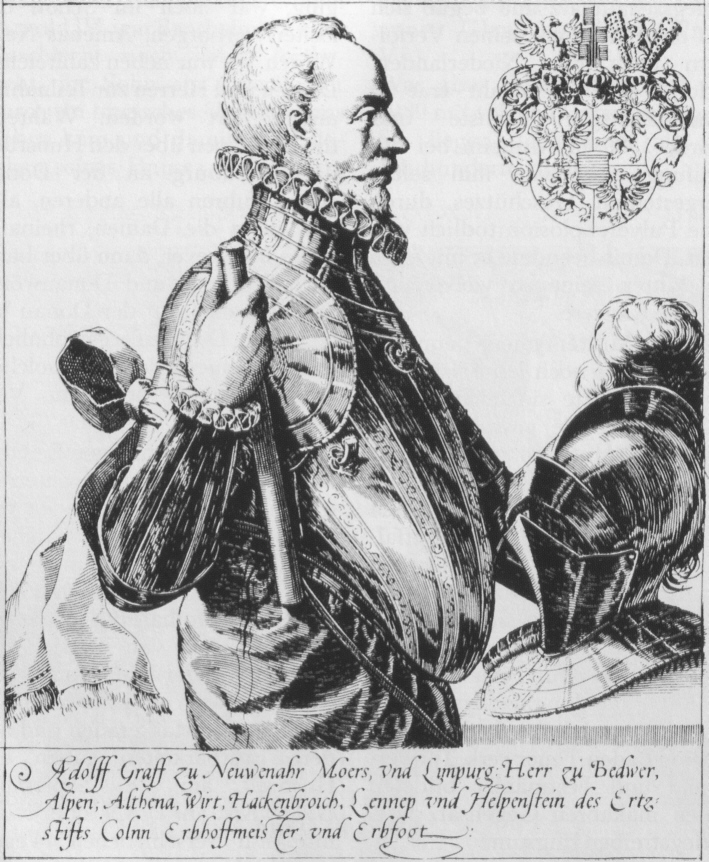
- Adolf von Neuenahr, 1545-1589
- Born: c. 1545
- Died: October 18, 1589 (aged 43–44); Arnhem

Adolf van Nieuwenaar, Count of Limburg and Moers (also: Adolf von Neuenahr) (c. 1545 – 18 October 1589) was a statesman and soldier, who was stadtholder of Overijssel, Guelders and Utrecht for the States-General of the Netherlands during the Eighty Years' War.

== Early life ==
Nieuwenaar (as he is usually called in historiography) was the son of Count Gumprecht II von Neuenahr-Alpen and Amöna von Daun. After the death of his father in 1556 he was raised at the court of his guardian and uncle, the Protestant Count Hermann of Neuenahr and Moers, who was married to Magdalene, a half-sister of William the Silent, Prince of Orange. In 1570 he married his aunt Walburgis van Nieuwenaer, the widow of Philip de Montmorency, Count of Hoorn who had been executed by the Duke of Alba in 1568. She was the sister of his guardian Hermann. When Count Hermann died childless in December 1578, Niewenaar inherited his lands, including the county of Moers. All these lands are close to the current border between Germany and the Netherlands, and abutted the Duchy of Guelders in the Habsburg Netherlands.

== Participation in the Cologne War ==
Nieuwenaar encouraged the Prince-elector and Archbishop of Cologne Gebhard Truchsess von Waldburg to retain his control of the Electorate of Cologne after he married Agnes von Mansfeld-Eisleben and converted to Calvinism. In 1583 Pope Gregory XIII excommunicated Gebhard, and the Cathedral chapter chose Ernest of Bavaria as the new Elector. War broke out between the two rivals: it was known as the Cologne War. Gebhart was supported by Nieuwenaar (as his general), his brother, Karl, Truchsess von Waldburg-Trauchburg and the Dutch rebels. Ernest by his brothers, Wilhelm V, Duke of Bavaria, Ferdinand of Bavaria, and eventually by Spain. By 1586, Nieuwenaar was driven out of all his German possessions.

== Stadtholderate ==
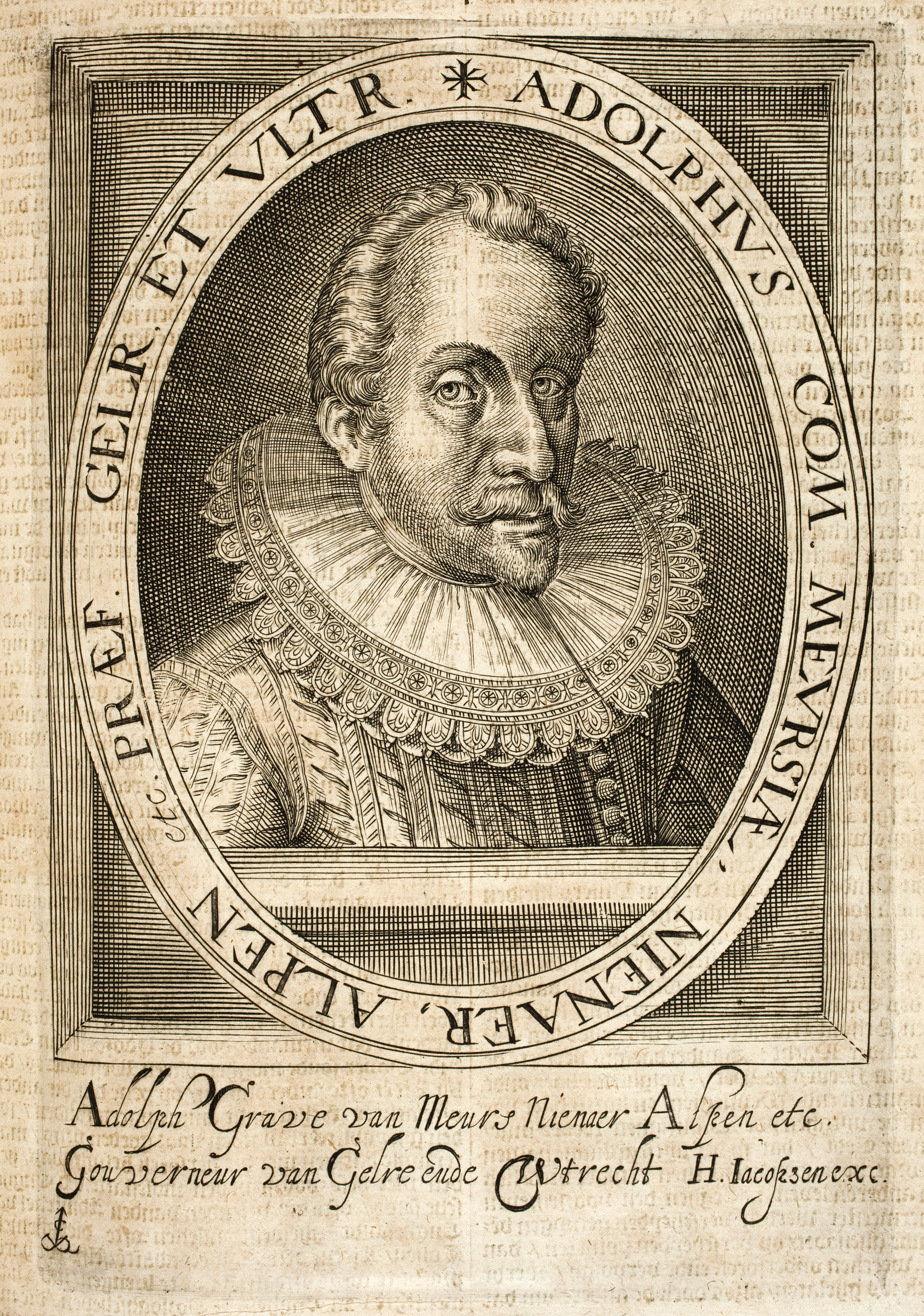
Adolf van Nieuwenaar

However, he soon found a new position in the rebellious Netherlands. The stadtholder of the province of Gelderland in the States-General, Willem IV van den Bergh, had been caught in treasonous correspondence with the Spanish Governor-General of the Habsburg Netherlands, Alexander Farnese, Duke of Parma, and had been deposed in November 1583. Nieuwenaar was now appointed the new stadtholder. As such he only controlled the city of Arnhem and surroundings, however. Most of the province was in Spanish hands.

In August 1584, Nieuwenaar's uncle, the Prince of Orange, who at the time was also Stadtholder of Utrecht and Overijssel, was assassinated. After some delay, the States-General appointed Nieuwenaar as stadtholder of these provinces in his uncle's place. In Utrecht a political struggle ensued between radical Calvinists and more conservative nobles and regents. In this conflict, Robert Dudley, 1st Earl of Leicester, who became the new Governor-General on the side of the States-General in the northern Netherlands in 1585, chose the side of the radicals, and so did Nieuwenaar. However, after Leicester's departure for England in 1587, Nieuwenaar gradually changed his stance. He brought about a (nominal) reconciliation between the warring parties. After a bloodless coup in 1588 the radicals were ousted from the city of Utrecht, but this did not undermine Nieuwenaar's position as stadtholder.

As stadtholder, Nieuwenaar was also commander-in-chief of the military forces of the States-General in his provinces. As such he led several campaigns, but with little success. He captured Neuss in 1585, but this city was soon lost again to Spain. During his retreat, Nieuwenaar destroyed Kamp Abbey in 1586. In 1585, the Spanish general Juan Baptista de Tassis defeated him and Maarten Schenk van Nydeggen at the Battle of Amerongen on 23 June 1585. Schenk would in the same year build the fortress of Schenkenschans (Schenk's fortress) on his orders.

Nieuwenaar died in an explosion at Arnhem, while testing a new piece of artillery, on 18 October 1589.

== Sources ==
- (in Dutch)"Nieuwenaar, Neuenahr Adolf," in: Nieuw Nederlandsch biografisch woordenboek. Deel 5, p. 374

Political offices
Preceded by William of Orange	Stadtholder of Utrecht; 1585–1589	Succeeded by Maurice of Nassau
Preceded by Willem IV van den Bergh	Stadtholder of Guelders; 1583–1589	Succeeded by Maurice of Nassau
Preceded by Francisco Verdugo	Stadtholder of Overijssel; 1585–1589	Succeeded by Maurice of Nassau
