= Hermann Friedrich Cloedt =

- Born: c. 1555-1560; Northelen, near Werl
- Died: 26 July 1586 (aged 25–31); Neuss, near Duisburg
- Burial place: not buried
- Relatives: Johann Cloedt (father) (c. 1527–1587), General of Cavalry, Henry IV
- Military career
- Branch: Mercenary
- Service years: French Service, c. 1580–85; Dutch Service, 1585–86; Count Adolf von Neuenahr, 1586.
- Rank: "Colonel"
- Commands: Military Commander, Neuss, March 1586–July 1586

Hermann Friedrich Cloedt (c. 1555-1560 – † 26 July 1586) was commander of the garrison at Neuss (Nuys), near Duisburg, in July 1586, when the city was destroyed by the Duke of Parma's Army of Flanders. He died in the defense of Neuss.

== Biography ==
Cloedt was born in Northelen, near Werl, the fourth of ten sons of Johann Cloedt (c. 1527–1587) and Margaretha of Westphalia. As a young man, he served for several years in Henry III's army in France; by 1585, he served under the Dutch provinces, and in 1586, he was in the force of Adolf von Neuenahr, when he secured the city of Neuss for Gebhard Truchsess von Waldburg, the Calvinist contender for the Electorate of Cologne, during the so-called Cologne War (1583–1588).

== Sack of Westphalia ==
In March 1586, accompanied by Martin Schenck von Nydeggen, who had switched to Dutch Service in 1585, Cloedt went to the County of Westphalia at the head of 500 foot and 500 horse. After plundering Vest and Recklinghausen, on 18 March he and Schenck captured Werl through trickery. They loaded a train of wagons with his soldiers and covered them with salt. When the wagons of salt were seen outside the city gates, they were at once admitted, salt being a valued commodity. The "salted soldiers" then over–powered the guard and captured the town. Some of the defenders escaped to the Werl citadel, which his troops stormed in vain. When they could not capture the citadel, they thoroughly sacked the city. Count Claude Barclay, also known as Haultpenne, collected his force of 4,000 and besieged them in Werl. Schenck and Cloedt were thus attacked from the outside, and from the several hundred guards in the Werl citadel. They loaded their wagons, this time with booty, took 30 magistrates as hostages, and attacked Haultpenne's force, killing about 500 of them, and losing 200 of their own. After fighting their way through Haultpenne's force, Cloedt returned to Neuss and Schenck to Venlo on the Neuss river.

== Defense of Neuss ==
In late July 1586, the Duke of Parma surrounded Neuss with over 8,000 Italian and Spanish troops of the Army of Flanders, and another 2,000 men under the command of Karl von Mansfeld. They grossly outnumbered the defenders of the city, reported variously as 1,600 or 1,800, including largely farmers, citizens, shepherds, clerics, teachers, journeymen, day laborers, and various craftsmen. Prior to a punishing cannonade, the Duke offered terms, which Cloedt declined. The city, he claimed, had no authority to treat with him, as the city's rights and protection came from the Holy Roman Emperor himself. As the herald left, the journeymen hurled insults at him and the Duke of Parma. At the assault of the Rhine Gate, over 400 men were killed, and Cloedt was gravely injured. In short order, the fortifications were overrun, and 10,000 Spanish, Italian and Germans entered the city, intent on plunder and whatever else they could find. Cloedt was found in the abbey in the center of the town, and hanged from the window with six of his commanders.

=== Aftermath ===
Eight of the buildings in the city remained standing at the end of the battle. A fire consumed most of the town that had not been damaged in the cannonade. The entire garrison of 1,600 defenders was killed, either in battle or subsequently; over 3,000 civilians were also killed.

== See also ==
- Cologne War
- Gebhard Truchsess von Waldburg
