= Karl, Truchsess von Waldburg =

Karl, Truchsess von Waldburg (7 August 1548 – 18 June 1593), was a Baron and Steward of Waldburg in Trauchburg (1580), as well as Imperial minister. Hewas born in the Fürstenburg fortress of Heiligenberg, the third son of William, known as the Younger, (6 March 1518 – 17 January 1566), Baron and Seneschal of Waldburg and an Imperial Councilor, and his wife, Johanna v. Fürstenberg (1529–1589). His family was an old Swabian house and he was descended from the Jacobin line of the House.

After 1580, he also bore the title Truchseß von Waldburg in Trauchburg (1580) and president of the Imperial Judicial Chambers. He served his brother, Gebhard Truchsess von Waldburg, as steward and stadtholder of Bonn after 1582, and as his brother's general in the Cologne War (1582–1589). He migrated with his brother to Strasbourg at the conclusion of the war in 1589, and died there in 1593. He is buried in the Strasbourg Minister.

On 6 May 1572, he married Countess Leonore of Hohenzollern (15 February 1551 – after 2 April 1605), daughter of Charles I, Count of Hohenzollern and Margravine Anna of Baden-Durlach.

== Family tree ==
William I Truchsess von Waldburg in Trauchburg; 1470–17 March 1557, in Scheer aka Wilhelm the Elder regent of Württemberg (1521–24) House of Waldburg, Friedberg, Scheer etc.	Sibylle von Waldburg zu Sonnenberg (born around 1480) House of Waldburg-Sonnenburg	Friedrich II von Fürstenberg; Wolfach 19 July 1496–8 March 1559 House of Fürstenberg	Anna von Werdenberg m. 19 February 1516 died 1554 House of Fürstenberg aka Heiress of Heiligenberg
William II Truchsess von Waldburg in Trauchburg; 6 March 1518–17 January 1566 aka Wilhelm the Younger Freiherr and Truchseß von Waldburg, in Trauchburg, Friedberg, Scheer etc., imperial counselor and chamerlain	Johanna von Fürstenberg; 12 May 1529–3 March 1589 Countess Fürstenberg
Friedrich (1546–1570)	Gebhard (1547–1601)	Anna (d 1608)	Margarete (d. 1612)	Eleanore (d. 1609)
Karl, Truchsess von Waldburg in Trauchburg (1548–1593)	Christoph (1551–1612)	Sibylle (d. 1585)	Ferdinand (1554– † 1585)

Notes and references
1. (in German) Michaela Waldburger, Waldburg und Waldburger - Ein Geschlecht steigt auf in den Hochadel des Alten Reiches 2009, Accessed 15 October 2009

== References and notes ==
Bibliography

- Waldburg, Michaela, Waldburg und Waldburger – Ein Geschlecht steigt auf in den Hochadel des Alten Reiches, 2009, Accessed 15 October 2009
- Vochezer, Joseph, Geschichte des fürstlichen hauses Waldburg in Schwaben, v. 3 (1907), Kempten, Kösel, 1888–1907.
