= Salentin IX of Isenburg-Grenzau =

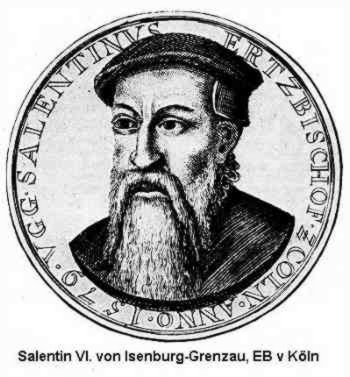
- Born: circa 1532
- Died: 19 March 1610 (aged 77); Burg Arenfels
- Burial place: Rommersdorf
- Relatives: Ernst von Isenburg Grenzau
- Military career
- Service years: Cologne War 1583–1588
- Conflicts: Destruction of Neuss (July 1586)

Salentin IX of Isenburg-Grenzau (German: Salentin IX. von Isenburg-Grenzau) (c. 1532–1610)[1] was the Archbishop-Elector of Cologne as "Salentin of Isenburg" from 1567 until 1577, the Bishop of Paderborn from 1574 until 1577, and the Count of Isenburg-Grenzau from 1577 to 1610.

== Biography ==
=== Early life ===
Salentin IX was the second son of Count Henry of Isenburg-Grenzau. As his parents did not have the money to educate all three of their sons, the elder two, John and Salentin, were chosen and sent to the cathedral of Mainz in 1548. In 1558 he became a member of the cathedral of Cologne. When his younger brother Anthony died in 1563, his elder brother John left the church and returned to Isenburg-Grenzau. In 1565 he obtained office in St. Gereon in Cologne, and also in that year John died.

Although often named Salentin VI, VII, or VIII, he is correctly named Salentin IX: Salentin VI was the count of Lower-Isenburg (German: Graf von Nieder-Isenburg), (born ~1370, died after 1458), Salentin VII was the lord of Isenburg and Neumagen (German: Herr von Isenburg und Neumagen) and founder of the last Isenburg-Grenzau line, born before 1492, died after 24 September 1534, and Salentin VIII was the 2nd son of Salentin VII.

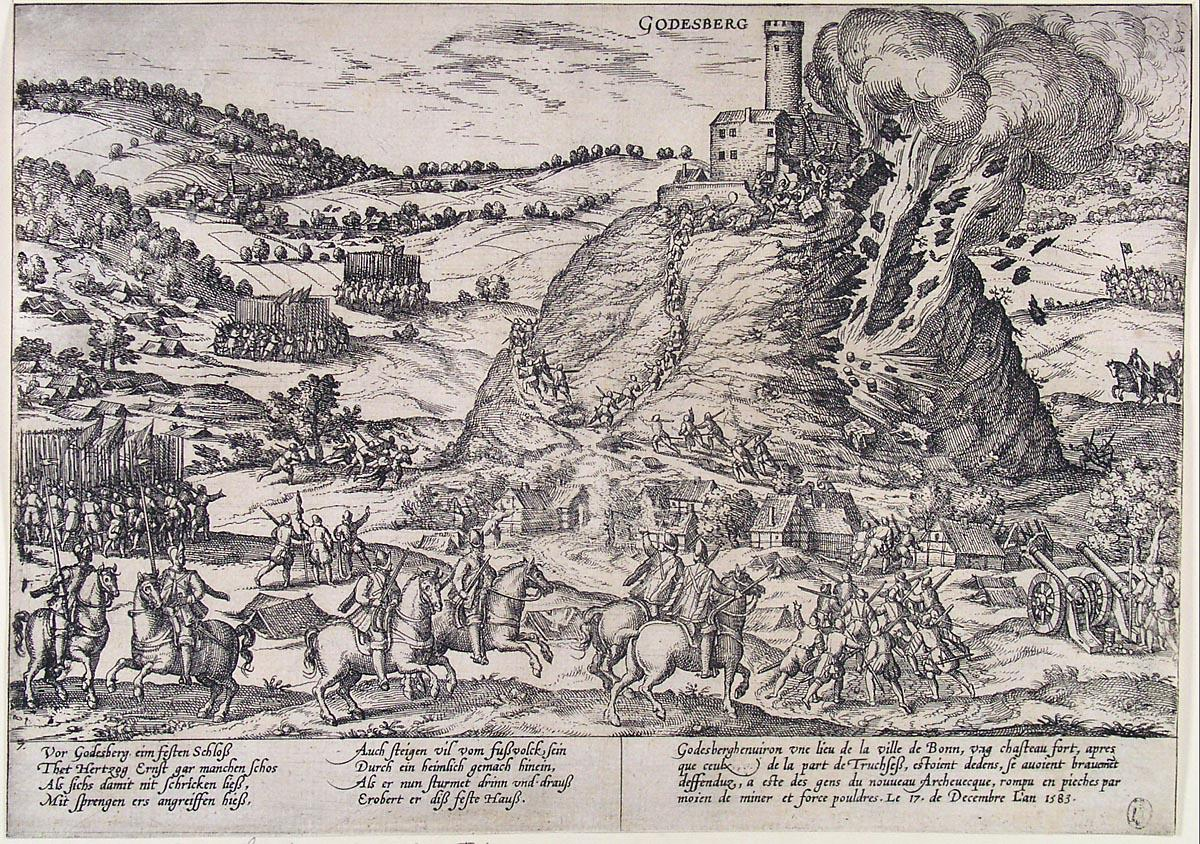
Salentin's successor converted to Protestantism, triggering a war in the Electorate. In one of the first major sieges of the war, the Godesburg (fortress) was destroyed; the walls were breached by mines, and most of the defenders were put to death. Engraved by Frans Hogenberg, a Dutch engraver and artist of the 16th century.

=== Archbishop of Cologne and Bishop of Paderborn ===
On 23 December 1567 he was elected the Archbishop of Cologne, and therefore Prince-Elector. He did not have priestly consecrations as he intended to leave the church and take up rulership of the County of Isenburg-Grenzau in the foreseeable future, a condition which had the support of the cathedral chapter and the Holy Roman Emperor but not Pope Pius V, who demanded a new election was to take place. However Pius V died in 1572 and his successor, Gregory XIII, confirmed the election the following year.

As the archbishop of Cologne, Salentin used its resources to improve the conditions in Isenburg-Grenzau, and succeeded in obtaining for it the status imperial immediacy in the Bench of Counts of the Wetterau. On 21 April 1574 he was also elected the Bishop of Paderborn and received papal confirmation. On 9 December he arrived in splendour at Paderborn surrounded by thousands of attendants. During his reign he reorganised the administration and the finances of the dioceses. He retired from the Bishopric of Paderborn on 5 September 1577 and the Archbishopric of Cologne eight days later.

=== Later life ===
Salentin succeeded Count Arnold in Isenburg-Grenzau. On 10 December 1577, he married Antonia Wilhelmina of Arenberg, the sister of Charles de Ligne, 2nd Prince of Arenberg. He had two sons, Salentin X and Ernest I and both, like their father, had successful military careers. Salentin died on 19 March 1610 and was buried at the Praemonstratensian Abbey of Rommersdorf.

Salentin of Isenburg-Grenzau House of Isenburg Born: 1532 on Isenburg Castle near Dierdorf Died: 19 March 1610 ibidem
Regnal titles
Catholic Church titles
Preceded by Friedrich IV von Wied	Archbishop-Elector of Cologne and Duke of Westphalia and Angria as Salentin; 1567–1577	Succeeded by Gebhard II Truchsess von Waldburg
Preceded by John II of Hoya	Prince-Bishop of Paderborn^{1} 1574–1577	Succeeded by Henry IV of Saxe-Lauenburg
Regnal titles
Preceded by Arnold	Count of Isenburg-Grenzau as Salentin IX; 1577–1610	Succeeded by Salentin X
