= Margret =

Margret may refer to -

- 1410 Margret, an asteroid
- Árný Margrét (born 2001), Icelandic musician
- SS Margret, a Norwegian steamship in service 1994-06/18
- Margret Benedictsson (1866–1956), Icelandic-Canadian suffrage activist and journalist
- Margret Borgs (1909–1993), German diver
- Margret Boveri (1900-1975), German journalist and writer
- Margret Buscher (1938–1991), German sprinter
- Margret Craver (1907-2010), American artist and arts educator
- Margret Dieck (1941–1996), German gerontologist
- Margret Dünser (1926–1980), Austrian journalist
- Margret Fusbahn (1907–2001), German aviator
- Margret Göbl (1938–2013), German pair skater
- Margret Grebowicz, Polish philosopher, author, and professor
- Margret Hafen (born 1946), German alpine skier
- Margret Hagerup (born 1980), Norwegian politician
- Margrét Rósa Hálfdánardóttir (born 1994), Icelandic basketball player
- Margret Hassan (born 1997), South Sudanese sprinter
- Margret Helgadottir, Norwegian-Icelandic author and editor
- Margret Hofheinz-Döring (1910-1994), German painter and graphic artist
- Margret Hölle (1927–2023), German poet and playwright
- Margret Holmes Bates (1844-1927), American author
- Margret Joseph (born 1999), Papua New Guinean footballer
- Margret Kiener Nellen (born 1953), Swiss attorney, translator and former politician
- Margret Kratz (born 1962), German footballer
- Margret Kreidl (born 1964), Austrian writer
- Margret Marri, footballer from Burma
- Margret Mbeba, Zambian politician
- Margret Nikolova (1928–2026), Bulgarian pop singer
- Margret Nissen (born 1938), German photographer
- Margret Okunga Makoha, Ugandan politician
- Margret Rasfeld (born 1951), German author and activist
- Margret Rey (1906–1996), American writer and illustrator
- Margret RoadKnight (born 1943), Australian singer-guitarist
- Margret Schleidt (1928–2012), German human ethologist
- Margret Steckel (born 1934), Luxembourgian writer
- Margret Stender (born 1947), German volleyball player
- Margret Suckale (born 1956), German manager and lawyer
- Margret the Adroit medieval Icelandic carver
- Margret Wittmer (1904–2000), one of the original settlers of Floreana Island
- Ann-Margret, Swedish-American actress, singer, and dancer (born 1941)

== See also ==
- Margaret
