= Siege of Godesberg =

1583 siege during the Cologne War

- Part of the Cologne War
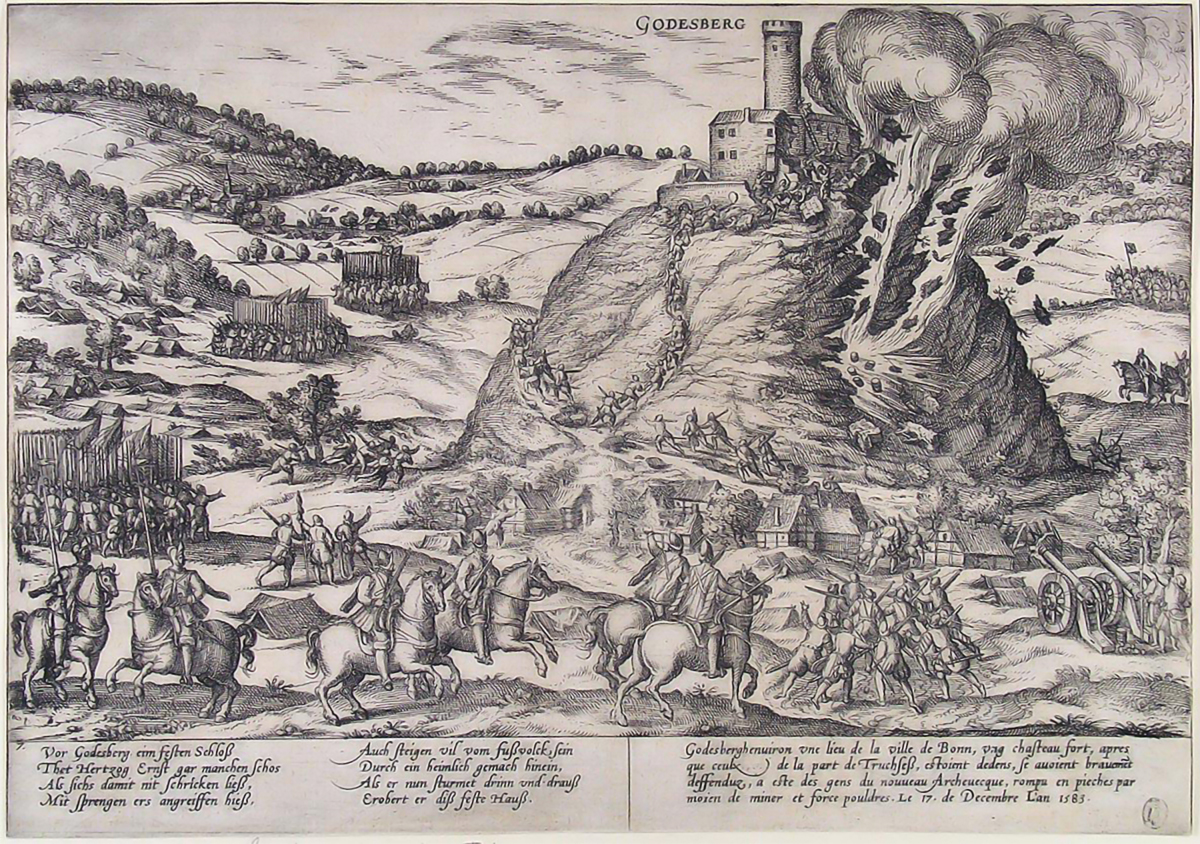
- Capture of Godesberg in 1583
Date	November – 17 December 1583
Location	Godesberg, Cologne 50°41′9″N 7°9′6″E
Result	Catholic victory

Belligerents
Ernest of Bavaria; House of Wittelsbach	Gebhard von Waldburg

Commanders and leaders
Ferdinand of Bavaria; Charles de Ligne	Felix Buchner; Eduard Sudermann

Strength
400+ infantry 5 squadrons of cavalry	~180 infantry

Casualties and losses
Unknown killed and wounded	178 killed

The siege of Godesberg, 18 November – 17 December 1583, was the first major siege of the Cologne War (1583–1589). Seeking to wrest control of an important fortification, Bavarian and mercenary soldiers surrounded the Godesberg, and the village then of the same name, now Bad Godesberg, located at its foot. On top of the mountain sat a formidable fortress, similarly named Godesburg, built in the early 13th century during a contest over the election of two competing archbishops.

Towering over the Rhine valley, the Godesburg's strategic position commanded the roads leading to and from Bonn, the Elector of Cologne's capital city, and Cologne, the region's economic powerhouse. Over time, the Electors strengthened its walls and heightened its towers. They added a small residence in the 14th century and the donjon (also called a Bergfried or keep) developed as a stronghold of the Electoral archives and valuables. By the mid-16th century, the Godesburg was considered nearly impregnable and had become a symbol of the dual power of the Prince-electors and Archbishops of Cologne, one of the wealthiest ecclesiastical territories in the Holy Roman Empire. The Cologne War, a feud between the Protestant Elector, Gebhard, Truchsess of Waldburg, and the Catholic Elector, Ernest of Bavaria, was yet another schismatic episode in the Electoral and archdiocesan history.

The Godesburg came under attack from Bavarian forces in November 1583. It resisted a lengthy cannonade by the attacking army; finally, sappers tunneled into the basalt core of the mountain, placed 680 kilograms (1,500 lb) of powder into the tunnel and blew up a significant part of the fortifications. The explosion killed many of the defending troops, but the resulting rubble impeded the attackers' progress, and the remaining defenders continued to offer staunch resistance. Only when some of the attackers entered the castle's inner courtyard through the latrine system were the Bavarians able to overcome their opponents. The Godesburg's commander and some surviving defenders took refuge in the keep; using prisoners held in the dungeons as hostages, the commander negotiated safe passage for himself, his wife and his lieutenant. The others who were left in the keep—men, women and children—were killed. Nearby Bonn fell to the Bavarians the following month.

== Background ==
The secular possessions of the Elector of Cologne stretched for about 60 kilometers (37 mi) along the Rhine River. The gray lines show the modern boundaries of Germany, Belgium and the Netherlands; the rivers are also shown on their modern course. Cologne, the imperial city, was not a part of the Electorate's secular domains, although it was part of the episcopal diocese. Venlo, Duisburg, Dortmund and Nijmegen were also not in the Electorate, but were important locations in the Cologne War

The Cologne War, 1583–1589, was triggered by the 1582 conversion of the Archbishop-Prince Elector of Cologne, Gebhard, Truchsess of Waldburg, to Calvinism, and his subsequent marriage to Agnes of Mansfeld-Eisleben in 1583. When he refused to relinquish the Electorate, a faction of clerics in the Cologne Cathedral chapter elected another archbishop, Ernest of Bavaria, of the House of Wittelsbach.

Initially, troops of the competing Archbishops of Cologne fought for control of the Electorate; within a few months, the local feud between the two parties expanded to include supporters from the Electorate of the Palatinate on the Protestant side, and the Duchy of Bavaria on the Catholic side. Italian mercenaries hired with papal gold augmented the Catholic force. In 1586, the conflict expanded further, with direct involvement of the Spanish Netherlands for the Catholic side, and tertiary involvement from Henry III of France and Elizabeth I of England on the Protestant side.

At its most fundamental, it was a local feud between two competing dynastic interests—the Seneschals (Truchsess) of the House of Waldburg and the dukes of the House of Wittelsbach—that acquired religious overtones. The dispute had broad implications in the political, social, and dynastic balance of the Holy Roman Empire. It tested the principle of ecclesiastical reservation established in the religious Peace of Augsburg (1555). The 1555 agreement settled religious problems in the Empire with the principle Cuius regio, eius religio: the subjects of a secular prince followed the religion of their sovereign. Ecclesiastical reservation excluded the territories of the imperial prelates (bishops, archbishops, abbots or abbesses) from cuius regio, eius religio. In an ecclesiastical territory, if the prelate changed his religion, his subjects did not have to do so. Instead, the prelate was expected to resign from his post. Problematically, the 1555 agreement did not specify this detail.

=== Controversy of conversion ===
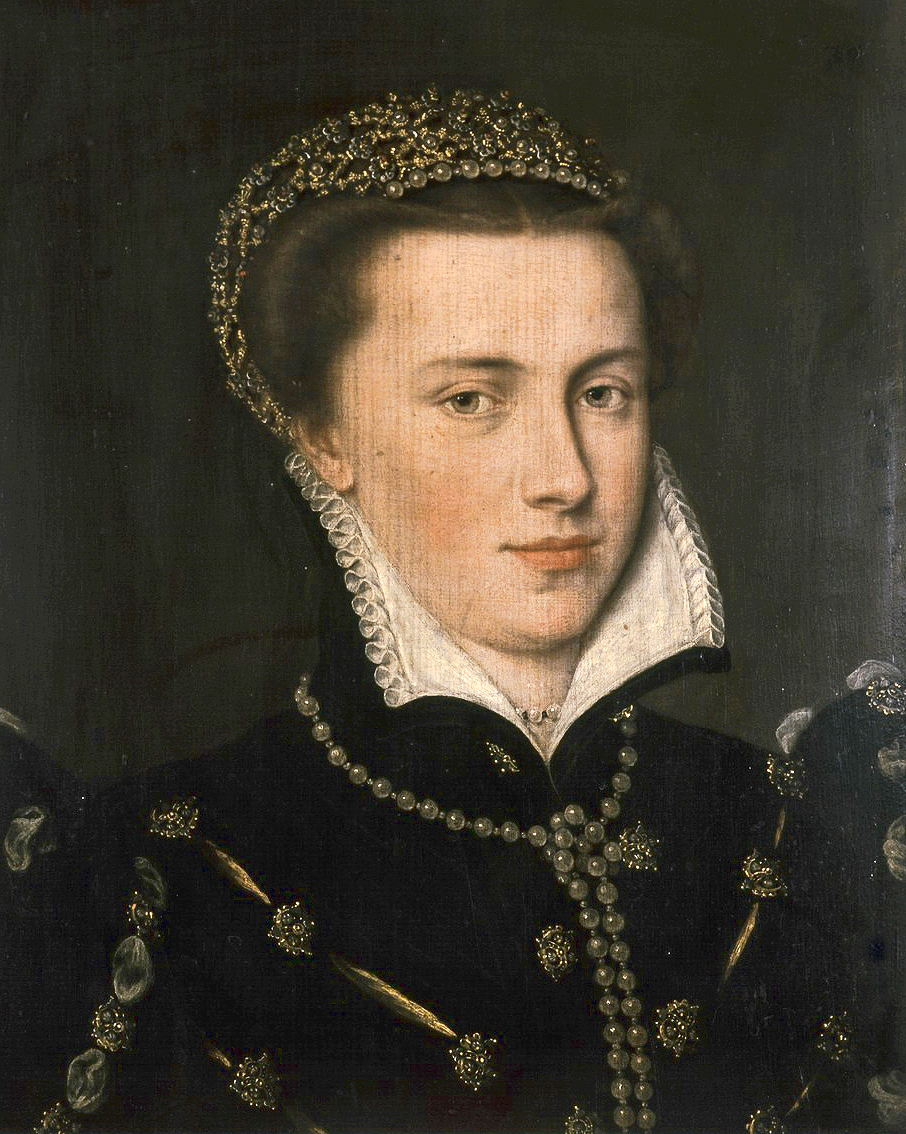
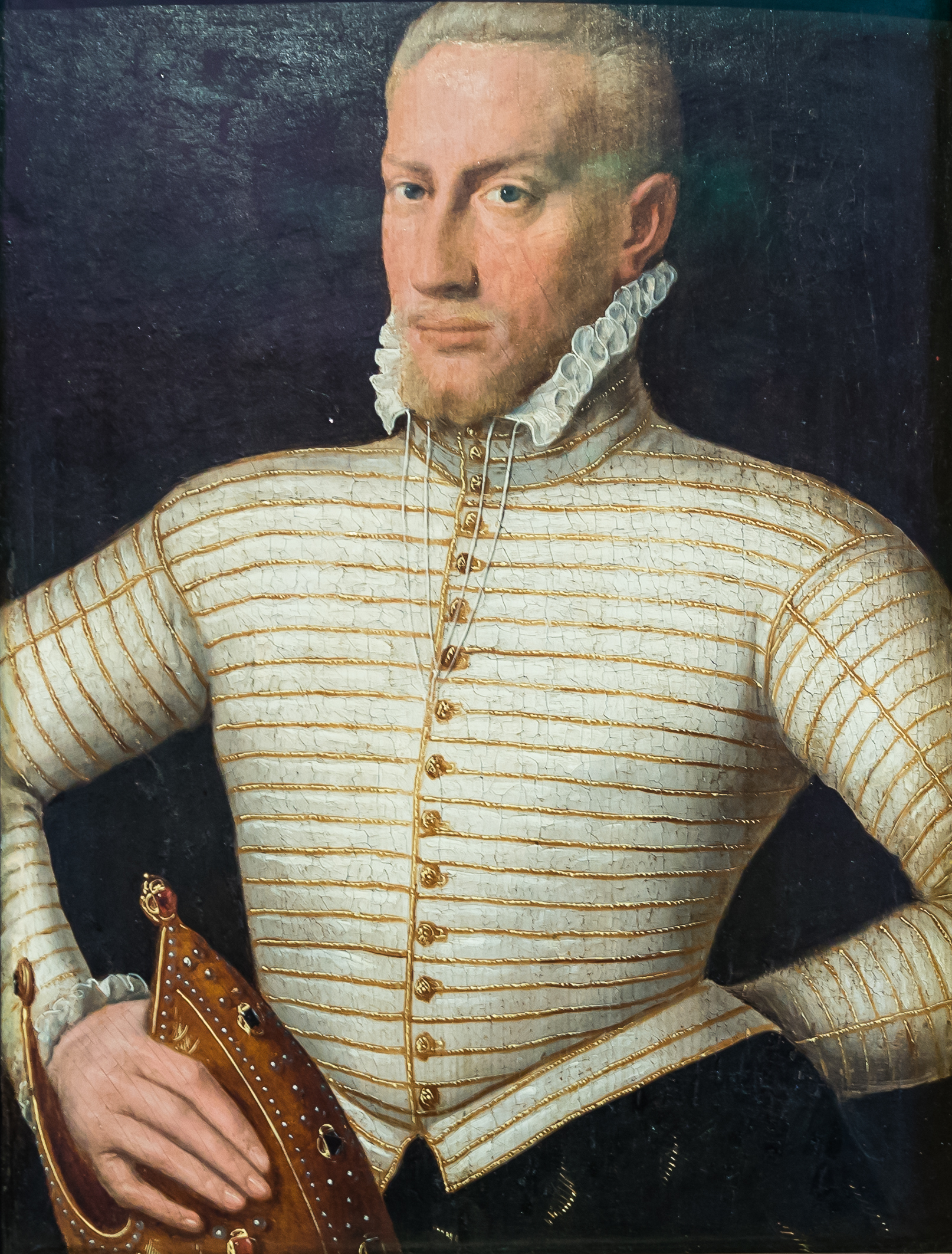
Gebhard Truchsess von Waldburg (right) converted to Protestantism and married a Protestant canoness, Agnes von Mansfeld-Eisleben (left); when he refused to resign from his ecclesiastical dignities, the Cathedral chapter elected another archbishop.

Agnes of Mansfeld-Eisleben was a Protestant canoness (meaning that she was a woman living in a religious community, but not bound by a perpetual vow) at a convent in Gerresheim, today a district of Düsseldorf. After 1579, she maintained a lengthy liaison with the Archbishop of Cologne, Gebhard of Waldburg-Trauchburg, Truchsess of Waldburg. In defense of her honor, two of her brothers convinced Gebhard to marry her, and Gebhard considered converting to Calvinism for her. Rumors spread throughout the Electorate of his possible conversion, and that he might refuse to relinquish his position. The Electorate had overcome similar problems. Hermann of Wied had converted to Protestantism and resigned in 1547. Salentin of Isenburg-Grenzau, Gebhard's immediate predecessor, had resigned upon his marriage. In December 1582, Gebhard announced his conversion and extended equal religious rights to Protestants in the Electorate. In February, he married Agnes. At the end of March 1583, the Pope excommunicated him. The Cathedral chapter promptly elected a new archbishop, Ernest of Bavaria.

With two competing archbishops, both claiming the see and the Electorate, the contenders and their supporters gathered the troops. In numbers, Ernest had the advantage. The Pope hired 5,000 mercenaries from the Farnese family to support the new Elector. Ernest's brother, the Duke of Bavaria, provided an army and Ernest arranged for his brother Ferdinand's army to take possession of the so-called Oberstift, the southern territory of the Electorate; his troops plundered many of its villages and towns.

With the support of Adolf von Neuenahr and the Count Solms, Gebhard secured some of the northern and eastern portions of the Electorate, where he held a geographical advantage in his proximity to the rebellious Dutch provinces. In the south, however, Ferdinand's troops hunted the soldiers Gebhard had left in possession of such Oberstift villages as Ahrweiler and Linz; Gebhard's troops were forced out of their strongholds, hunted through the countryside, and eventually captured. By the fall of 1583, most of the Oberstift had fallen to Ferdinand's army and many of Gebhard's erstwhile supporters—including his own brother—had returned home. In some cases, they honored parole agreements made after their capture. A strong supporter, Johann Casimir of Simmern, brother of the powerful Louis VI, Elector Palatine, returned to the Palatine when his brother died. Other supporters were frustrated by Gebhard's chronic inability to pay his troops, or intimidated by threats of Rudolf II, Holy Roman Emperor. By late October 1583, most of the Oberstift had fallen, although he still held the Godesburg, located near the villages of Godesberg and Friesdorf, the formidable fortress at Bonn, and the fortified village of Poppelsdorf.

== Fortress ==
The Godesburg foundation stone was laid on 15 October 1210 upon the order of Dietrich of Hengebach, the Archbishop of Cologne, who was himself in disputed possession of the Electorate and fighting to keep his position. Although his competitors deposed Dietrich in 1212, his successors finished and enlarged the fortress; it featured in chronicles of the subsequent centuries as both a symbolic and physical embodiment of the power of the archbishop of Cologne in his many struggles for regional authority in secular and ecclesiastical matters. Furthermore, by the late 14th century, the fortress had become the repository of the Elector's valuables and archives. By the mid-16th century, with the inclusion of residential facilities, the castle was popularly considered the Lieblingssitz, or the favorite seat (home), of the Electors.

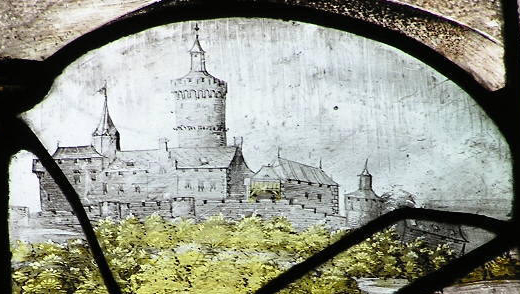
The Godesburg before its destruction, as depicted on a church stained-glass window circa 1500. This drawing is believed to be the only surviving detailed picture of the castle as it looked before its destruction. The image shows the structure as seen from the north; St. Michael's Chapel is visible on the right, in the foreground

The fortification originally had been constructed in the medieval style. In the reign of Siegfried II of Westerburg (1275–1295), it successfully resisted a five-week siege by the Count of Cleves. Successive archbishops continued to improve the defenses with stronger walls, adding levels to the central Bergfried, which was cylindrical, not square like many medieval donjons. In addition to the construction of the small residence, these archbishops also expanded the inner works to include dungeons and a chapel; they fortified the walls with towers and crenelations, added a curtain wall, and improved the roads that led to the entrance in a series of switchbacks. By the 1580s, the Godesburg was not only the favorite residence of the Elector, but also an elaborate stone fortress. Although it retained some of its medieval character, it had been enhanced partially in the style made popular by Italian military architects. The physical location on the mountain did not permit the star-shaped trace italienne; nevertheless, the Godesburg's cordons of thick, rounded walls and massive iron-studded gates made its defenders formidable adversaries. Its height, some 120 meters (400 ft) above the Rhine on the peak of a steep hill, made artillery assault difficult. The approach road, with its hairpin turns, made battering rams impractical. The turns, overlooked by the castle wall, made foot assault dangerous and slow. Defenders could fire down on attackers from many angles.

Fortifications such as this, and the star-shaped fortresses more commonly found in the flatter lands of the Dutch Provinces, increasingly made 16th-century warfare both difficult and expensive; victory was not simply a matter of winning a battle over the enemy's army. Victory required traveling from one fortified and armed city to another and investing time and money in one of two outcomes. Ideally, a show of extraordinary force convinced city leaders to surrender. If the show of force did not intimidate a city, the alternative was an expensive siege that reduced the city to rubble and ended with storming the ruins. In the case of the former, when a city capitulated, it would have to quarter troops at its own expense, called execution, but the soldiers would not be permitted to plunder. In the case of the latter, no quarter would be given to the defenders and the victorious soldiers were released to pillage, plunder, and sack.

== Investment of the Godesburg ==
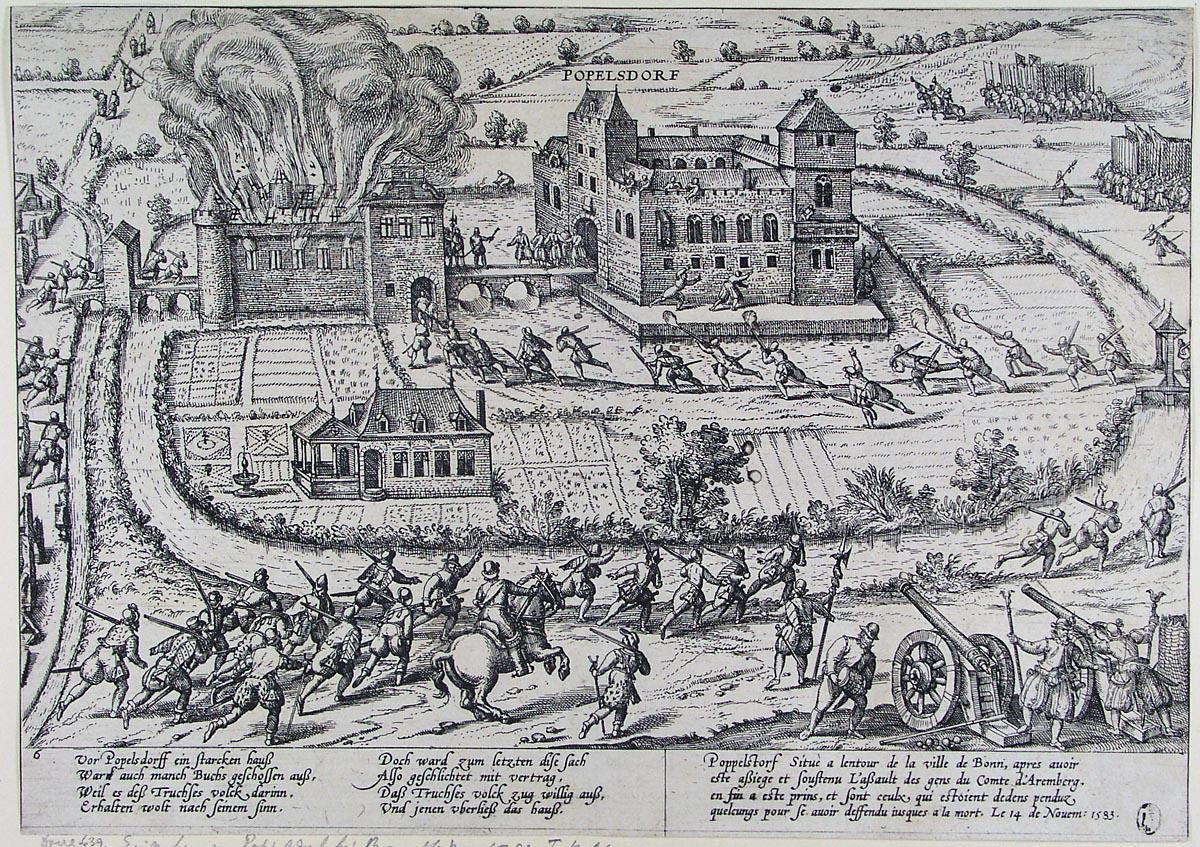
Poppelsdorf, Gebhard's country home where he first brought his bride in February, was taken by Ernest's supporters in mid-November, 1583. After they finished at Poppelsdorf, they moved to Godesberg

On 13–14 November, Ferdinand of Bavaria (Ernest's brother) and the Count of Arenberg took the Elector's castle at Poppelsdorf; on 18 November, they moved to attack the Godesburg. This fortress was considerably stronger than the one at Poppelsdorf and of supreme strategic importance for the projected attack on Bonn, the capital city of the Electorate.

The Godesburg was defended by Lieutenant Colonel Felix Buchner, Captain of the Guard Eduard Sudermann, a garrison of soldiers from the Netherlands, and a few cannons. Sudermann was a patrician from Cologne, and the son of Dr. Heinrich Sudermann (1520–1591), a jurist and ambassador, and one of the most influential men in the imperial city and throughout the merchant capitals of the northern German states. According to contemporary sources, around 180 people lived in the facility, including peasants, the Dutch soldiers defending it, and an unknown number of women and children. The fortress was also home to several of Gebhard's prisoners. The Abbot of Heisterbach, Johann von St. Vith, had been taken prisoner in July 1583 when Sudermann's troops sacked several villages in the region and plundered the Heisterbach monastery. Other prisoners held in the Godesburg included Gebhard von Bothmer, the suffragan (auxiliary bishop) of Hildesheim, and Captain Ranucino from Florence, the captured commander of Deutz, across the Rhine from Cologne. To besiege the fortress, Ferdinand brought more than 400 Fussvolk (foot soldiers) and five squadrons of mounted soldiers, plus a half dozen heavy caliber cannons, called culverins. His soldiers, among them Spanish and Italian mercenaries, took up quarters in neighboring villages, a process accompanied by pillage, arson, murder and rape. On 18 November, the first day of the siege, Ferdinand sent a trumpeter and formally asked the fortress to surrender; the defending garrison replied that they had sworn their allegiance to Gebhard and would fight to the death for him.

=== Cannonade (18–28 November 1583) ===
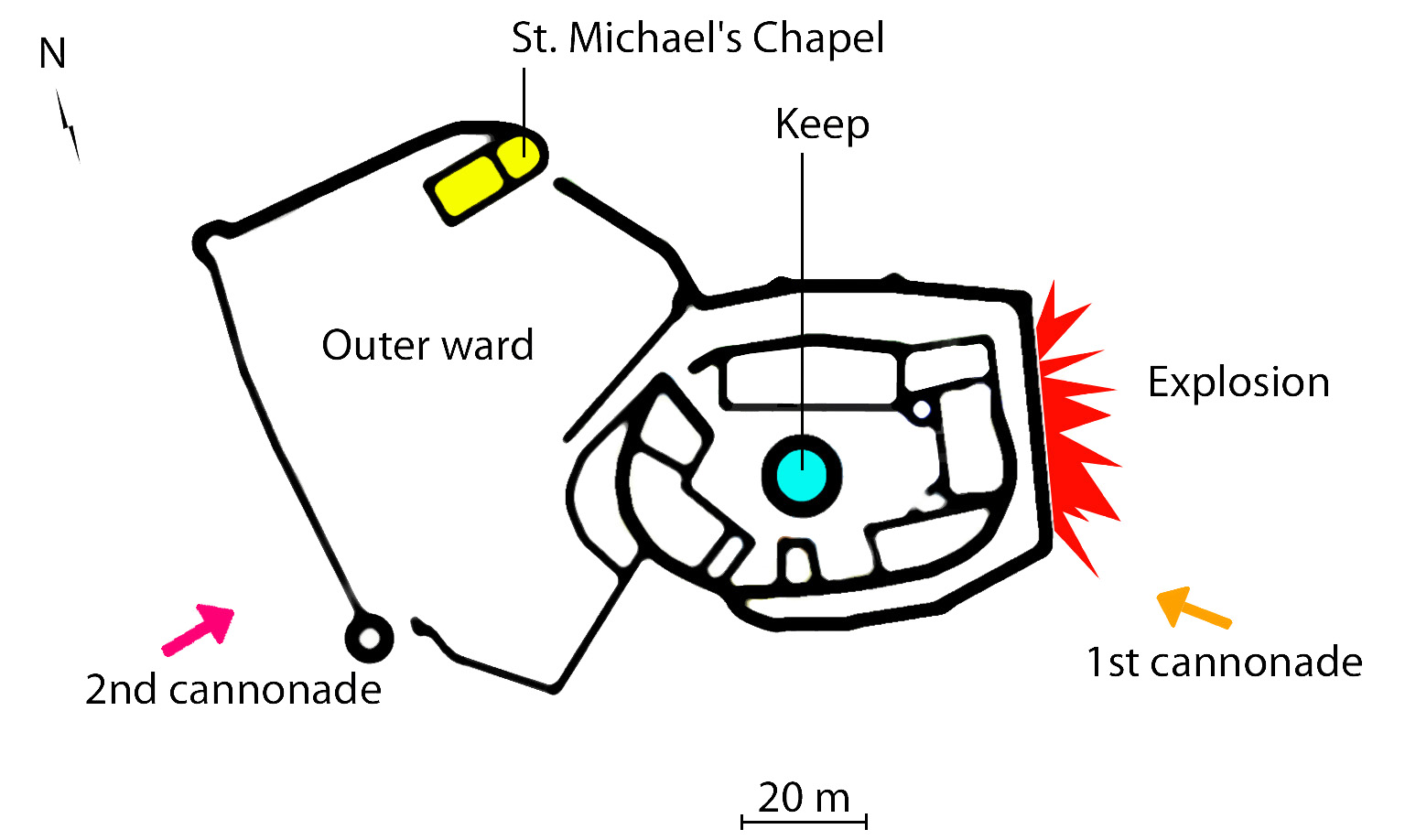
The first cannonade took place from the south-east; the cannons were located in Godesberg village at the foot of the mountain. The second cannonade was from a vineyard to the west; it temporarily breached the walls of the outer ward.

In response, Ferdinand took control of the village at the foot of the mountain and encircled the site. He surveyed the locale for two days to identify the most promising angle of attack. The customary equipage of siege warfare—the siege tower, the trebuchet, and the crossbow—would be ineffective. The distance between the curtain wall and the valley floor and the angle of the hill placed the Godesburg out of range. The besiegers had no choice but to use expensive artillery, although the angle would decrease its effectiveness. Ferdinand initially placed three cannons at the foot of the mountain, in Godesberg village. Daily, cannonballs and mortar shells smashed against the castle's walls. Nightly, the defenders repaired the damage. At the following sunrise, the assault began anew. Ferdinand's cannons were ineffective against the fortification, as were his mortars; in the course of the cannonade, return fire even managed to destroy a few of his own pieces. From his place of safety in the north, Gebhard understood well the potential of the loss of the Godesburg, yet he was relatively helpless to help his garrison. In an effort to garner financial support from the Protestant states, in November 1583 he wrote to the Archbishop of Canterbury, in London: "Verily, the Roman Antichrist moves every stone to oppress us and our churches ..."

Although financial help from the English was not forthcoming, Ferdinand could not break the defenses. On 28 November, ten days after the beginning of the siege, artillery fire had wasted several thousand pounds of powder in the ineffectual bombardment. Ferdinand moved his cannons to an elevated position in a hillside vineyard to the west of the Godesburg. The height offered a more advantageous trajectory with which to fire on the walls of the Godesburg's outer ward. Within a few hours, his cannonade had breached them. Ferdinand sent three Italian experts to examine the breach and to advise him on the next step; the Italians, having come under fire during their examination, concluded that storming the castle would incur many casualties. The defenders still had the advantage of height and would be able to shoot at attackers from multiple towers and defensive positions inside the walls. Ferdinand decided not to pursue this tactic. Unable to storm the castle, Ferdinand considered two options: abandon the siege, which he could not do, or blow up the fortress. This option of last resort usually made a fortress unusable. Furthermore, while he considered his options, the defenders repaired the breaches caused by the cannonade and reinforced the walls, making them even stronger than they had been. The defenders also removed the roof of the St. Michael's Chapel in the castle's outer ward, filled the chapel with dirt to reinforce its walls, and placed some of their artillery pieces within the walls.

=== Sapping (completed 16 December 1583) ===
Ferdinand reluctantly ordered saps to be dug into the side of the mountain. The sapping was difficult and dangerous and the sappers worked under continuous attack from the castle's defenders, who fired on them with small arms and the castle's artillery and dropped rocks and debris on their heads. The forced labor of local peasants minimized losses among Ferdinand's own troops, but many of the peasants perished in the effort.

On 6 December, the sappers reached the south-eastern side of the fortress's outermost wall and then spent another ten days undermining the basalt on which the castle stood; they completed their work on 16 December and placed 680 kilograms (1,500 lb) of powder into the mine. Ferdinand reported on the siege's progress in a letter to his older brother, Duke Wilhelm, dated 15 December 1583: "The fortress stands on solid rock. ...[Y]esterday we had reached the outer wall of the castle, and in a day or two we hope to send the fortress into the sky."

=== Destruction of the fortress (17 December 1583) ===
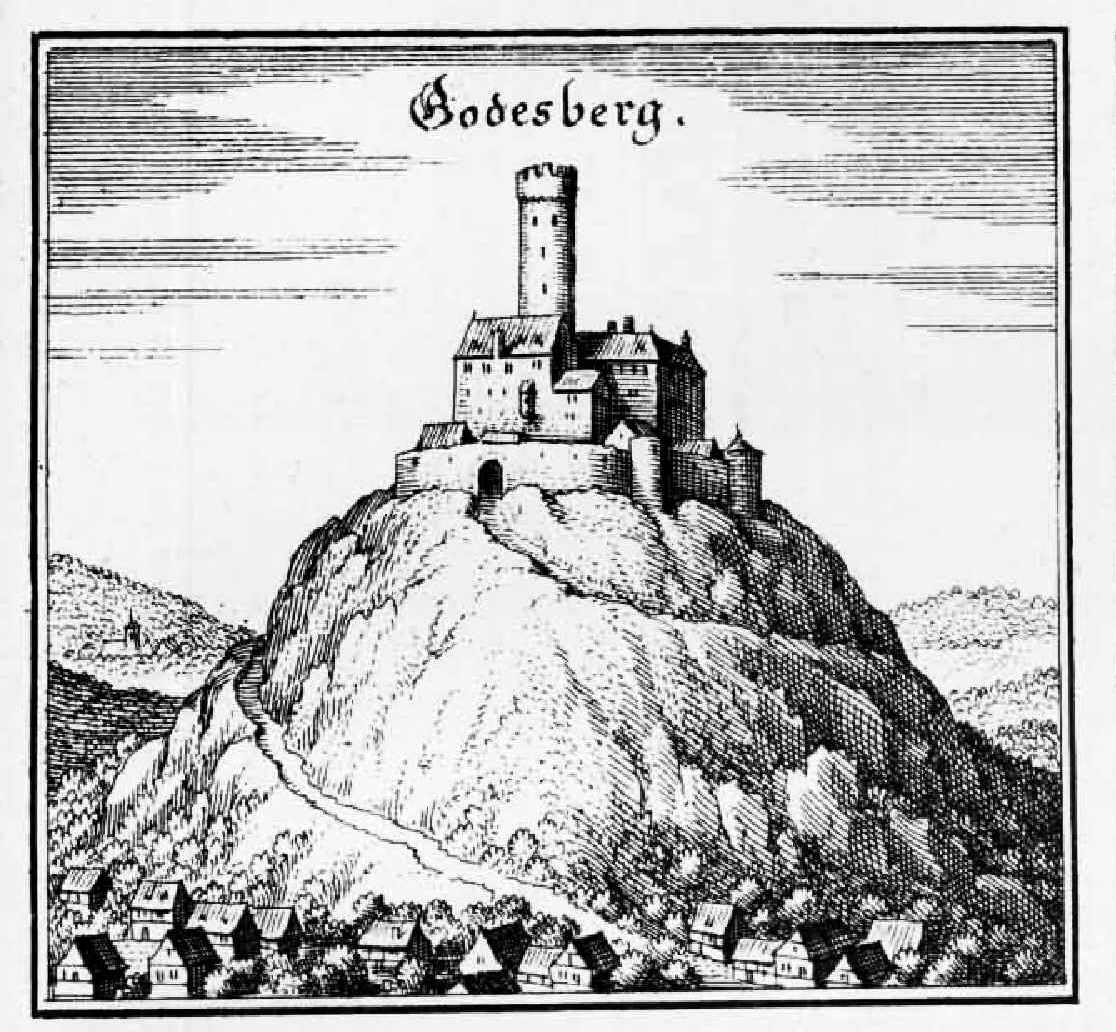
This engraving by the Swiss artist Matthäus Merian the Elder (1593–1650) depicts a view of the fortress prior to its destruction

On 17 December, Ferdinand again asked the castle's defenders to surrender. They replied that they did not know the meaning of the word and would hold the Godesburg to the last man. A report dated 23 December 1583 relates that, having given Ferdinand a rude reply, the defenders went back to lunch.

Ferdinand ordered 400 men to enter the saps; these men would storm the castle once the mine had been detonated. The remainder of his cavalry and foot soldiers were to wait in the fields below. Some sources assert that the fuse was lit at around 1:00 pm, although the 19th-century local historian Heinrich Joseph Floß argued that these sources are mistaken, and that the explosion clearly occurred in the morning. All sources agree that the explosion, with a dreadful crack, propelled chunks of the towers and walls high into the air. Almost half the Godesburg collapsed instantly. According to a newspaper report dated 13 January 1584, debris raining on the valley below damaged several houses, and destroyed some of them completely.

Amidst the flames and rubble, Arenberg's and Ferdinand's troops tried to storm the castle, but found their way blocked by masses of debris created by their own explosives. Furthermore, although close to half of the garrison had perished in the explosion and subsequent collapse of the fortifications, those who remained offered staunch resistance by throwing rocks on the approaching attackers, causing a large number of casualties. In frustration, 40 or 50 of the attackers tied together two ladders and crawled through the sluice-ways of the garderobe (latrines) that emptied on the hillside, thus gaining access to the interior of the castle. There they killed around 20 of the defenders in fierce fighting; the remaining defenders, approximately 70 men, among them Buchner and Sudermann, the garrison commander and his lieutenant, sought refuge in the castle's keep. In this way, Ferdinand's infantry at last gained unopposed access to the fortress. Storming the castle had taken about two hours.

Out of options, Buchner opened negotiations, using those interned in the castle as hostages. Presenting them at the keep's door, he made clear that they would be killed unless Ferdinand promised to spare his, his wife's and Sudermann's lives. Ferdinand acceded to Buchner's demand; some sources maintain that the Abbot of Heisterbach, one of the prisoners, had been treated decently by Buchner throughout his imprisonment in the castle and himself asked for Buchner's life to be spared. The prisoners were released. With much difficulty, given the state of mind of the besiegers, Ferdinand and Arenberg brought the Buchners and Sudermann out of the castle alive. Once the Buchners, Sudermann, and the hostages were clear of the fortress, Ferdinand released his troops, who were in an ugly mood and hungry for blood and plunder. All those who remained in the keep—soldiers, men, women and children—were killed, some inside the keep, some in the courtyard below; the slaughter lasted well into the night. The castle's 178 dead were buried in two mass graves whose locations remain unknown. Among those who perished in the destruction and storming of the castle was also one of the prisoners, a vicar from Hildesheim. The Hildesheim suffragan, too, was not among the rescued prisoners; he had died during his incarceration, a short while before the castle was stormed.

Gebhard lost an important stronghold in the Oberstift and Ernest's forces had acquired a ruin. The residence was unusable, and the fortifications were mere rubble. The keep had survived the blast and various armies used it as a watch tower in the Thirty Years' War. Ernest's troops, under his brother's command, saturated the region, and the 7.3 kilometers (4.5 mi) between Godesberg and Bonn bore a greater resemblance to a military camp than to a road. Walloon riders and squadrons of Italian cavalry, paid for by the pope, galloped back and forth. Forty companies of infantry trudged toward Bonn, including Walloons and Bavarians. They looked forward to besieging Bonn, the Elector's capital city, to which they laid siege on 21 December 1583, and which they took on 28 January 1584.

== Aftermath ==
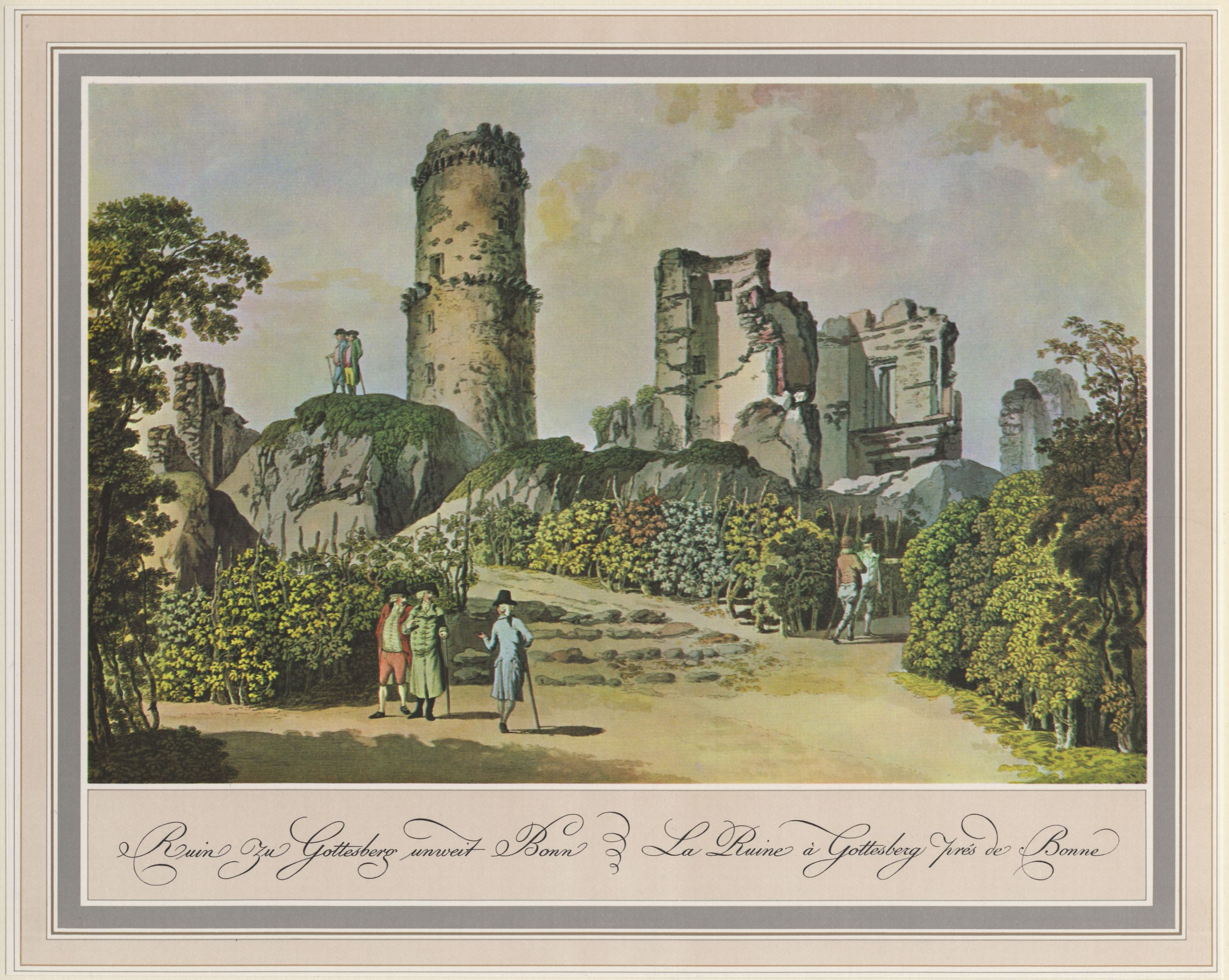
This 18th-century depiction shows the effects the explosion had on the thick stone walls

The siege of the Godesburg and its subsequent destruction were a mere taste of things to come. It was the first of many sieges in the Cologne War, and the castle's fall eventually led to the fall not just of Bonn, but of several other principal towns and cities in the Electorate of Cologne: Hülchrath, Neuss and Werl. Several smaller fortified towns such as Gelsenkirchen, Unkel and Brühl were also either heavily damaged or destroyed before, during and after the siege. In addition to damage to the towns and cities, Ernest's supporters managed to restrict imports and exports to and from the Electorate, not only crippling Gebhard's financial resources but resulting in economic hardship for the inhabitants.

Advances in military architecture over the previous century had led to the construction or enhancement of fortresses that could withstand the pounding of cannonballs and mortar shells. For both Gebhard and Ernest, winning the war required mobilizing enough men to encircle a seemingly endless array of enemy artillery fortresses. These could be protected with relatively small garrisons, but taking them required both expensive artillery and enough men to storm the battlements. Furthermore, the victor had to maintain and defend all his possessions as they were acquired. Even the ruin of the Godesburg required a garrison and a defensive strategy; as a strategic point on the north–south road from Bonn to Koblenz, it came under siege in 1586 and again in 1588. The Cologne War, similar to the Dutch Revolt, was not a war of assembled armies facing each other on a field, but a war of artillery sieges. It required men who could operate the machinery of war, which meant extensive economic resources for soldiers to build and operate the siege works, and a political and military will to keep the machinery of war operating.

The contemporary Wappen (or Arms) of Bad Godesberg depicts the 21st-century ruins of the keep of a medieval castle, and shows also the simple white shield with the black crusaders' cross of the Electorate of Cologne

The destruction of so prominent a fortress was also news. When Frans Hogenberg and Georg Braun compiled their Civitates Orbis Terrarum, a collection of important scenes and locales, they included Hogenberg's engraving of its destruction as not only an important sight, but an important event. Hogenberg lived in Bonn and Cologne in 1583, and likely saw the site himself. After overwhelming the Godesburg, the Bavarians found a large marble slab in the ruins: the castle's foundation stone, which had been displaced by the explosion. The stone is a block of black marble with a Latin inscription commemorating the construction of the fortress by Dietrich I von Hengebach in 1210: Anno · D(omi)ni · M·C·C·X · Gudensburg · Fundatum · E(st) · A · Teoderico · Ep(iscop)o · I(n) · Die · Mauror(um) · M(a)r(tyrum). A gold inscription was added to the back of the stone, noting that it had been found "on the very top of the blasted wall". Ferdinand took the stone to Munich, where it was kept in a museum beside a fresco painting in an arcade commemorating the siege. Today, the foundation stone is in the Rheinisches Landesmuseum in Bonn.

=== Long-term consequences ===
Gebhard's eventual defeat changed the balance of power in the Electoral College of the Holy Roman Empire. In 1589, Ernest of Bavaria became uncontested Prince-elector of Cologne, the first Wittelsbach to hold the position. Wittelsbach authority in northwestern German territories endured until the mid-18th century, with the election of a succession of Bavarian princes to the archbishop's throne and to the prince-elector's seat. This gave the family two voices in the choice of imperial candidates, which had ramifications in the 18th century. In 1740, Charles Albert, Duke of Bavaria, laid claim to the imperial title; his brother Klemens August of Bavaria, then the archbishop and prince-elector, cast his vote for Charles and personally crowned him at Frankfurt. The shift of the emperor's orb from the House of Habsburg to the Wittelsbach family, albeit a brief event, was only resolved by the ascension of Maximilian III Joseph who, with the Treaty of Füssen, eschewed any imperial pretensions.

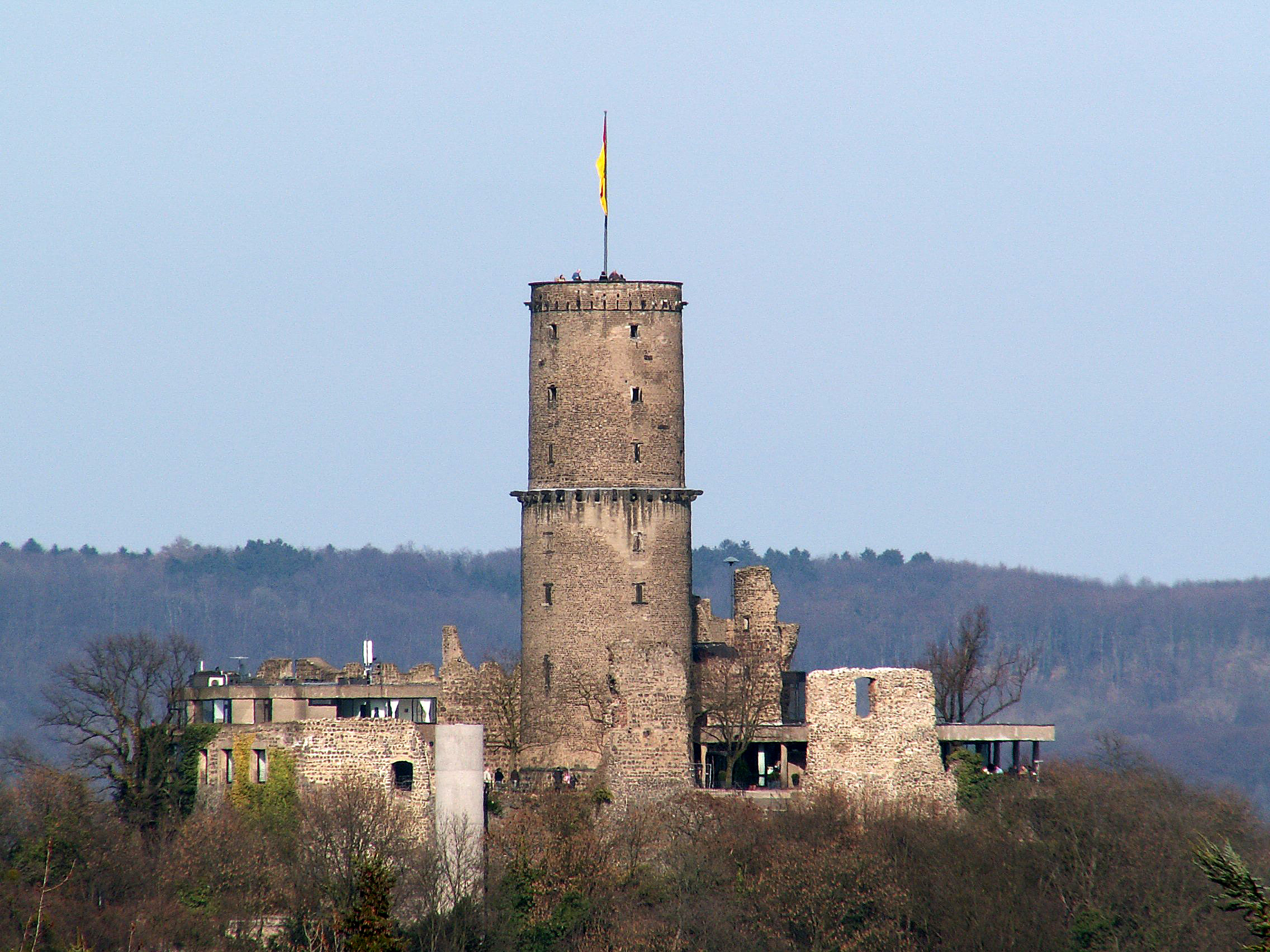
The Godesburg today

Gebhard's defeat also changed the religious balance in the northwestern states. Although the Peace of Augsburg (1555) had addressed earlier the problem of religious pluralism, the solution potentially converted simple, and usually local, legal disputes into dynastic and religious warfare, as the Cologne War itself demonstrated. The result of the Cologne War gave the Counter Reformation a foothold in the lower Rhine. Ernest was a product of Jesuit education. Once his position was secured, he invited Jesuits into the territory to help re-establish Catholicism, a task which the order approached zealously. They ejected Protestant pastors from parishes, sometimes by force, and re-established catechism education and pastoral visitations. Even when communities appeared to be reconverted, the Jesuits maintained strict supervision to identify recalcitrant Protestants or backsliders. The Jesuit reintroduction of Catholicism postponed the solution of Germany's religious problems for another half century.

Finally, the German tradition of local and regional autonomy created structural and cultural differences in the Holy Roman Empire, compared to the increasingly centralized authority of such other European states as France, England, and Spain. The unabashed intervention of Spanish, French, Italian, Dutch, English and Scots mercenaries in the war, as well as the influence of papal gold, changed the dynamic of internal German confessional and dynastic disputes. The great "players" of the early modern European political stage realized that they could enhance their own positions vis-a-vis one another by assisting, promoting or undermining local and regional competition among the German princes, as they did in the feud between Gebhard and Ernest. Conversely, German princes, dukes, and counts realized that they could acquire an edge over their competitors by promoting the interests of powerful neighbors.

The scale of involvement of such external mercenary armies as Spain's Army of Flanders set a precedent that internationalized contests of local autonomy and religious issues in the German states, a problem not settled until the Peace of Westphalia in 1648. Despite that settlement, German states remained vulnerable to both external intervention and religious division, as they were in the Cologne War.

== Sources ==
=== Bibliography ===
- (in German) "800 Jahre Godesburg". Godesberg Markt, 2010, a subpage of Bad Godesberg Info, 2002–2010. Accessed 20 July 2010.
- Benians, Ernest Alfred, et al. The Cambridge Modern History. New York: MacMillan, 1905.
- Brodek, Theodor V. "Socio-Political Realities of the Holy Roman Empire," Journal of Interdisciplinary History, 1971, 1(3), pp. 395–405.
- (in German) Dumont, Karl Theodor & Robert Haass. Geschichte der Pfarreien der Erzdiöcese Köln. Köln: Bachem, 1883–.
- (in German) Ennen, Leonard. Geschichte der Stadt Köln, meist aus den Quellen des Kölner Stadt-Archivs, Vol. 5. Köln/Neuß, L. Schwann'sche Verlagshandlung, 1863–1880.
- (in German) Floß, Heinrich Joseph Prof. Dr. "Eroberung des Schlosses Poppelsdorf, Sprengung und Erstürmung der Burg Godesberg und Einnahme der kurfürstlichen Residenzstadt Bonn. November 1583 – Februar 1584." In: Annalen des historischen Vereins für den Niederrhein, insbesondere die alte Erzdiözese Köln. Sechsunddreißigstes Heft, pp. 110–178. Köln: DuMont-Schauberg. 1881.
- (in German) Glaser, Hubert. Um Glauben und Reich: Kurfürst Maximilian I., München: Hirmer, 1980, ISBN 978-3-7774-3190-1.
- (in German) Hennes, Johann Heinrich. Der Kampf um das Erzstift Köln zur Zeit der Kurfürsten. Köln: DuMont-Schauberg. 1878.
- Holborn, Hajo, A History of Modern Germany, The Reformation. Princeton NJ: Princeton University Press, 1959.
- Ingrao, Charles. "Review of Alois Schmid, Max III Joseph und die europaische Macht. " The American Historical Review, Vol. 93, No. 5 (Dec., 1988).
- Kaufmann, J. E. et al. The Medieval Fortress: Castles, Forts and Walled Cities of the Middle Ages, Cambridge, MA: Perseus Books/Capo Press, 2001, ISBN 0-306-81358-0.
- (in German) Keussen, Hermann. "Sudermann, Heinrich". In: Allgemeine Deutsche Biographie (ADB). Band 37, Leipzig: Duncker & Humblot, 1894, pp. 121–127.
- Lomas, Sophie Crawford (editor). Calendar of State Papers Foreign, Elizabeth. Volume 18: July 1583 – July 1584 (1914), pp. 278–295. Norreys to Herle, October 8–18, 1583. Calendar of State Papers Foreign, Elizabeth, Volume 18: July 1583 – July 1584 (1914), pp. 250–265. Gebhard to the Archbishop of Canterbury, and the Bishop of London, 22 November 1583. Institute of Historical Research, British History Online Archived 2014-12-07 at the Wayback Machine, University of London & History of Parliament Trust, 2009. Accessed 22 November 2009.
- MacCaffrey, Wallace T. Elizabeth I: War and Politics, 1588–1603. Princeton, Princeton University Press, 1994, ISBN 978-0-691-03651-9.
- MacCulloch, Diarmaid. The Reformation. New York: Viking, 2004, ISBN 978-0-670-03296-9.
- (in German) Oedinger, F. Hauptstaatsarchiv Düsseldorf und seine Bestände, Siegburg: Respublica-Verlag, 1957 [1993], v. 7.
- (in German) Merlo, J.J. Hogenberg, Franz. In: Allgemeine Deutsche Biographie (ADB). Band 12, Leipzig: Duncker & Humblot, 1880, pp. 650–652.
- Parker, Geoffrey. The Thirty Years War. New York: Routledge, 1997 (second edition), ISBN 978-0-415-12883-4.
- Parker, Geoffrey. The Army of Flanders and the Spanish Road, 1567–1659: The Logistics of Spanish Victory and Defeat in the Low Countries' Wars (Cambridge Studies in Early Modern History). Cambridge: Cambridge University Press, 2004 (second edition), ISBN 978-0-521-54392-7.
- (in German) Potthoff, Tanja. Die Godesburg – Archäologie und Baugeschichte einer kurkölnischen Burg, Inaugural dissertation, Ludwig-Maximilians-Universität München, 2009.
- (in German) Potthoff, Tanja. Die Belagerung und Zerstörung der Burg Godesberg im Jahre 1583. In Wagener, Olaf and Laß, Heiko (eds.). ... wurfen hin in steine/grôze und niht kleine ... Belagerungen und Belagerungsanlagen im Mittelalter. Beihefte zur Mediaevistik, Band 7, Peter Lang Europäischer Verlag der Wissenschaften, 2006, ISBN 3-631-55467-2.
- Scribner, Robert W. "Why Was There No Reformation in Cologne?" Bulletin of the Institute of Historical Research, 49(1976): pp. 217–241.
- (in German) Schmidtz, F. "Heisterbach." In Minon, A. and Koenen, C. Rheinische Geschichtsblätter. Bonn: Hansteins Verlag, 1897, v. 3, pp. 128–224.
- (in German) Stiehl, Eckart. Die Stadt Bonn und ihr Umland: ein geographischer Exkursionsführer. Ferd. Dümmlers Verlag. ISBN 978-3-427-71661-7, 1997.
- Sutherland, N.M. "Origins of the Thirty Years War and the Structure of European Politics." The English Historical Review. Vol. 107, No. 424 (Jul., 1992), pp. 587–625.
- (in German) Untermann, Matthias. "primus lapis in fundamentum deponitur" Kunsthistorische Überlegungen zur Funktion der Grundsteinlegung im Mittelalter, Heidelberg University archive, p. 6. Originally published in: Cistercienser. Brandenburgische Zeitschrift rund um das cisterciensische Erbe 6, 2003, issue 23.
- (in German) Vochezer, Joseph. Geschichte des fürstlichen Hauses Waldburg in Schwaben, v. 3 (1907), Kempten. Kösel, 1888–1907.
- (in German) Wiedemann, Alfred. Geschichte Godesbergs und seiner Umgebung. Frankfurt am Main: Mohnkopf Reprints, 1920, [1979]. ISBN 978-3-8128-0025-9.
- (in German) Weyden, Ernst. Godesberg, das Siebengebirge, und ihre Umgebungen. Bonn: T. Habicht Verlag, 1864.
