= Francis Kruse =

German politician

Francis Kruse (born 1854 in Cologne, died 1930 in Bad Godesburg) was a German politician. He served as the president of the Regency in Bydgoszcz from 1901-1903, president of the Regency in Minden from 1903-1909, president of the Regency in Dusseldorf from 1909-1919.
