= Margetson =

Margetson is a surname. Notable people with the surname include:

- Arthur Margetson (1887–1951), British stage and film actor
- James Margetson (1600–1678), English churchman, Church of Ireland Archbishop of Armagh from 1663
- John Margetson (1927–2020), British ambassador to Vietnam, the United Nations, and the Netherlands
- Martyn Margetson (born 1971), Welsh former professional footballer and Wales international
- Philip Margetson (1894–1985), assistant commissioner of the London Metropolitan Police
- Stella Margetson (1912–1992), English novelist and writer
- William Henry Margetson (1861–1940), British painter and illustrator
- William James Margetson (1874–1946), Anglican priest in the first half of the twentieth century

== See also ==
- Margat
- Margit
- Margot
- Margret (disambiguation)
- Margut
