= Äskulapstein =

Roman votive stone

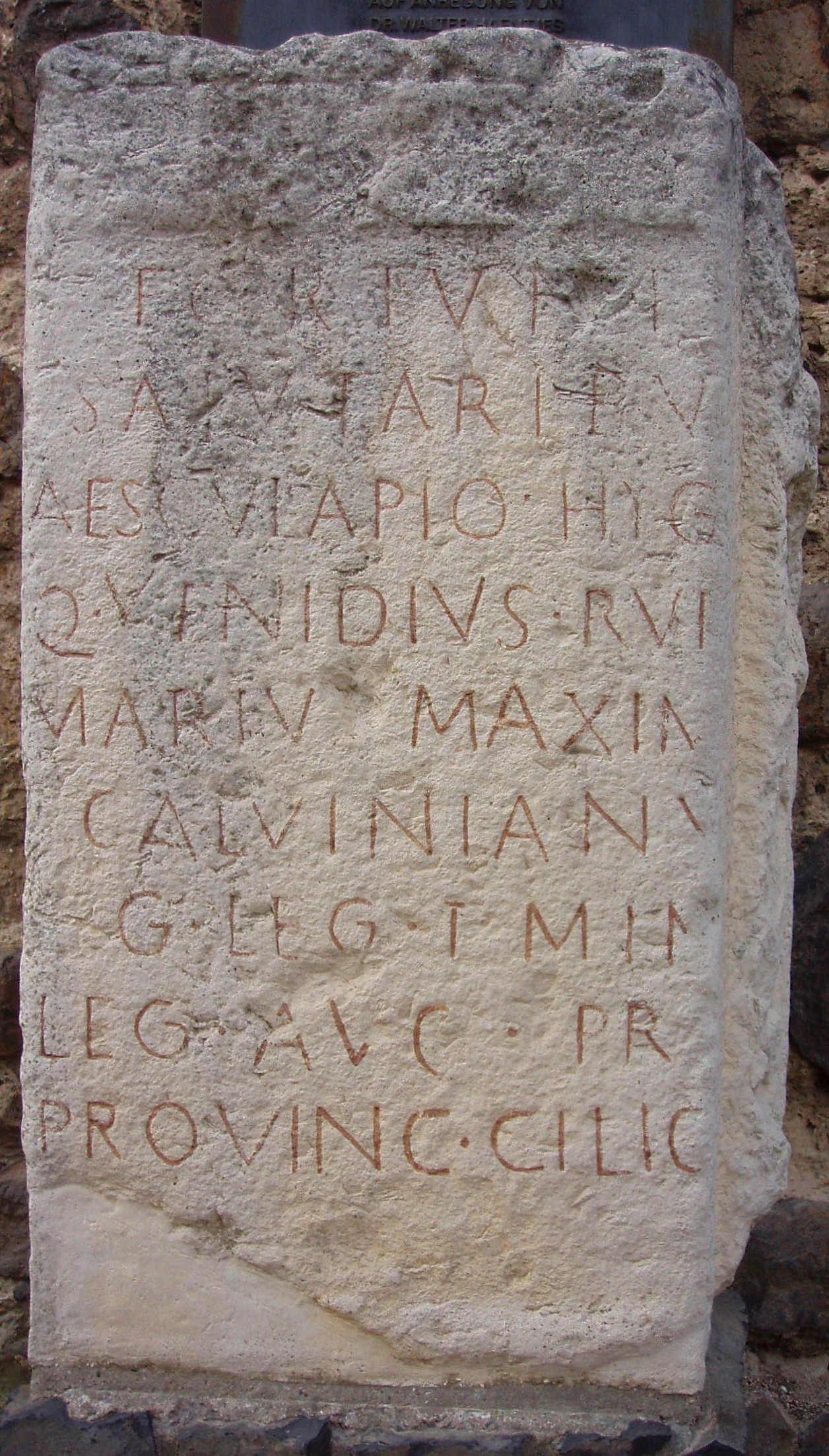
Copy of the votive stone from Godesburg

The Äskulapstein ("Aesculapius stone") is a Roman votive stone which was found in the sixteenth century at Godesburg. Today it is kept in the Rheinisches Landesmuseum Bonn.

== Description and history ==
The stone must have served as a consecrated altar. It was made from Drachenfels trachyte, is 110 cm high, 65 cm wide and 39 cm deep and its inscription reads:

Latin	English
Fortunis / Salutaribu[s] / Aesculapio / Hyg[iae] / Q(uintus) Venidius Ruf[us] / Mariu[s] Maxim[us] / [L(ucius)] Calvinianu[s] / [le]g(atus) leg(ionis) I Min(erviae) / leg(atus) Aug(usti) pr(o) [pr(aetore)] / provinc(iae) Cilic[iae] / d(onum) [d(edit)].	For healthy fortune, Q(uintus) Venidius Rufus Marius Maximus Lucius Calvinianus, legatus of the Legio I Minervia, Imperial legatus with praetorian rank of the Province of Cilicia, gave this gift to Aesculapius, to Hygieia

Thus the stone is dedicated to the healing gods Aesculapius and Hygieia.

The donor of the stone, Quintus Venidius Rufus Marius Maximus Lucius Calvinianus had served as legatus in the Legio I Minervia and was at the time of the donation legatus pro praetore or governor of Cilicia. He is also mentioned in an inscription from the year 198, with the title Legatus Augusti pro Praetore praeses provinciae Syriae Phoenic[iae] ("Imperial legatus of Praetorian rank protecting the province of Syria Phoenicia").

In 1868, J. Freudenberg concluded from this votive stone for healing gods "that already the Romans visited Godesberg, not just for its commanding and healthy setting, but also for the Draischbrunnen and Sauerbrunnen, used as watering holes, and perhaps even for cold water baths." He said this was confirmed by the discovery of remains of a Roman enclosure at the Draischbrunnen. Johanna Schopenhauer had suggested something similar already in 1828, saying "an ancient Roman votive stone dedicated to Aesculapius which was found at Godesberg in the sixteenth century and is now in Bonn in the museum of Rhineland and Westphalian antiquities, indicates that the Romans were already aware of the healing waters at Godesburg which may well have been as significant then as in our own day."

This theory has also been accepted in more recent scholarship: according to Tanja Potthoff, it is not clear whether the stone was incorporated into the wall of the castle after being found in the rubble when it collapsed in 1583 or was found near the current springs. Potthoff nevertheless assumes that it belonged to an otherwise unknown Roman healing spring located at or near Godesburg.

The Godesburg was preceded by a building from the third or fourth century; a Burgus with foundations, in which Roman concrete was used. Remains of this rectangular building survive at the base of the medieval bergfried. What purpose this building served is unknown, but according to the positions mentioned above, the Äskulapstein is an argument in favour of a sacral purpose. But since the stone is clearly older than the building remains, this is not very strong evidence. Another theory sees the remains as a Roman watchtower.

A copy of the stone is displayed at Godesburg.

== Bibliography ==
- Alfred Wiedemann. Geschichte Godesbergs und seiner Umgebung, Bad Godesberg 1930, pp. 5–6.
- Walter Haentjes. "Der Aeskulapstein von der Godesburg," in Godesberger Heimatblätter 17, 1979, pp. 5–15.
