= Godesburg =

Castle ruin in Germany

Coordinates: 50°41′6.42″N 7°9′2.43″E

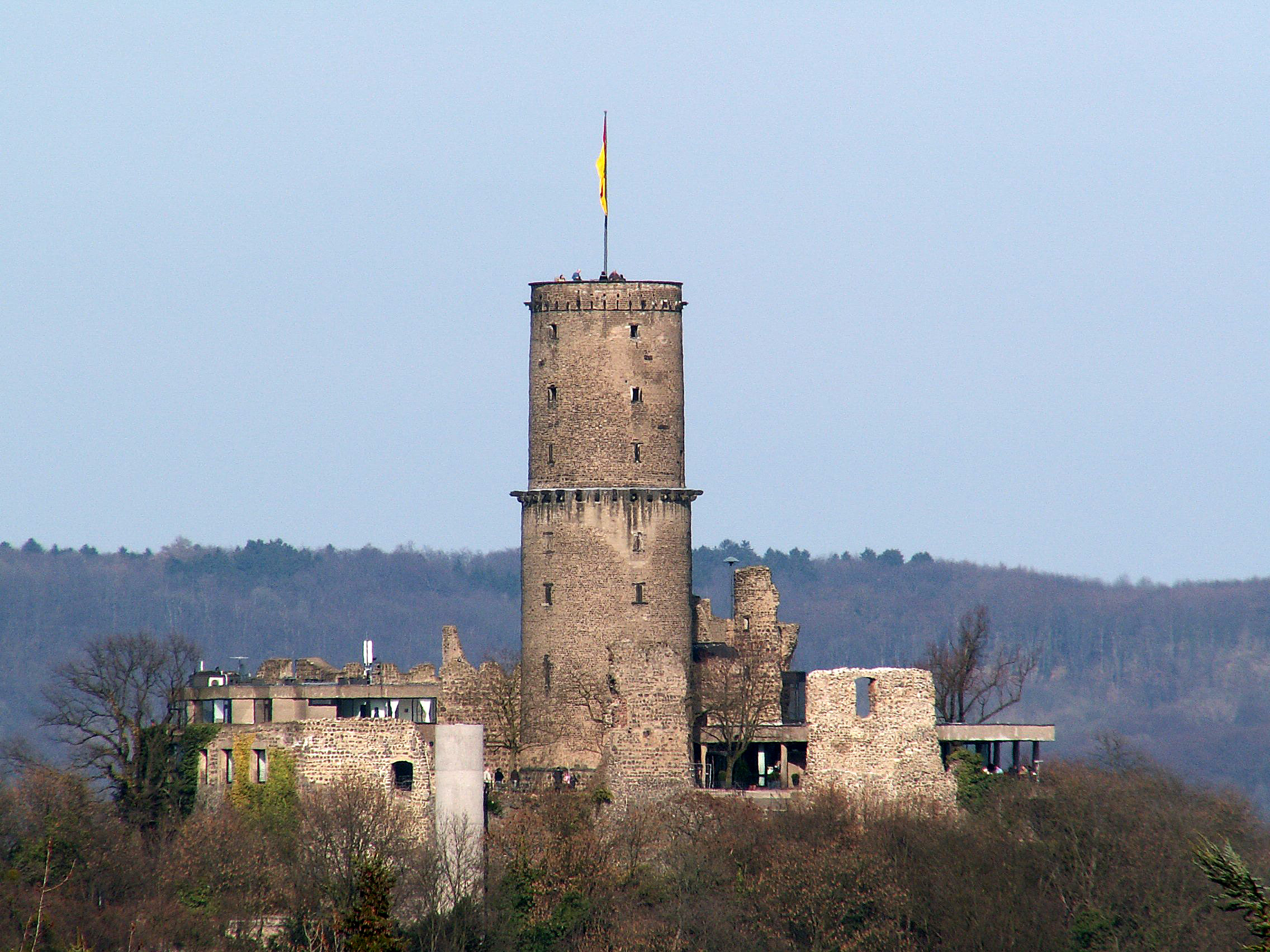
Godesburg castle in Germany.

The Godesburg is a castle in Bad Godesberg, a formerly independent part of Bonn, Germany.

Built in the early 13th century on the Godesberg, a hill of volcanic origin, it was largely destroyed following a siege in 1583 at the start of the Cologne War. In 1891, the German emperor Wilhelm II donated the castle's ruin to the city of Bad Godesberg.

In 1959, the ruin was rebuilt according to plans by Gottfried Böhm, to house a hotel and restaurant. Today, the restaurant is still in operation, but the hotel tract has been divided into apartments.

== Location ==
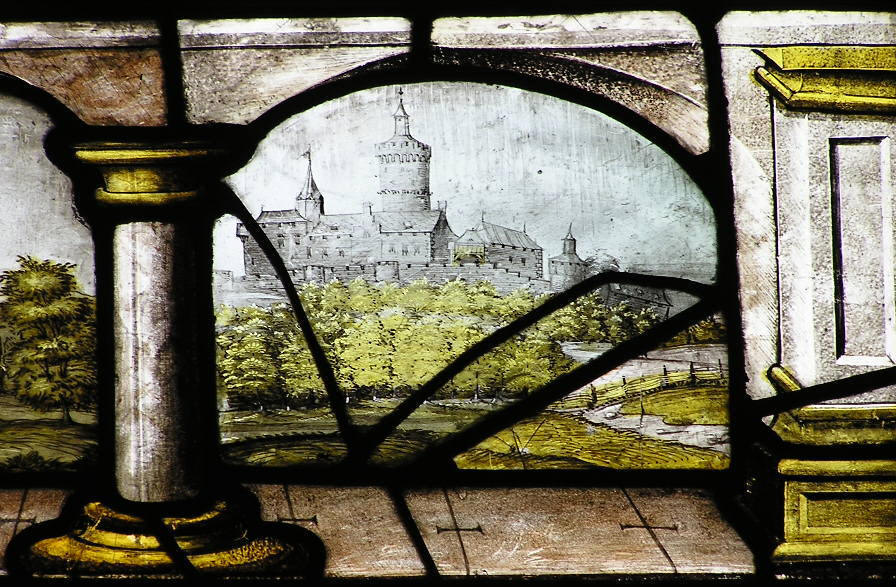
The castle depicted on a church stained glass window circa 1500, believed to be the only surviving detailed picture of the castle as it looked before its destruction.

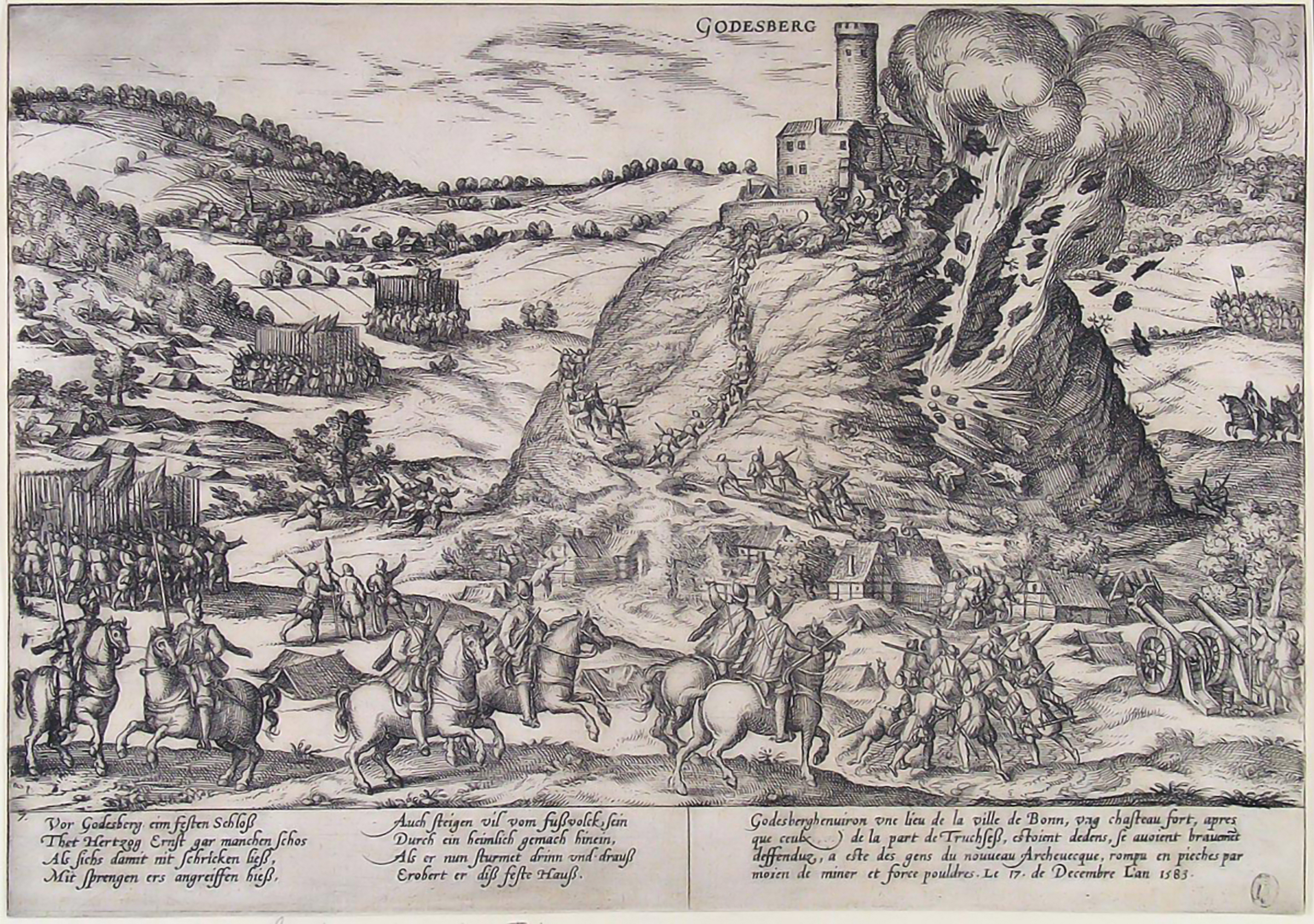
The destruction of the Godesburg in 1583; the attackers used explosives to breach the walls

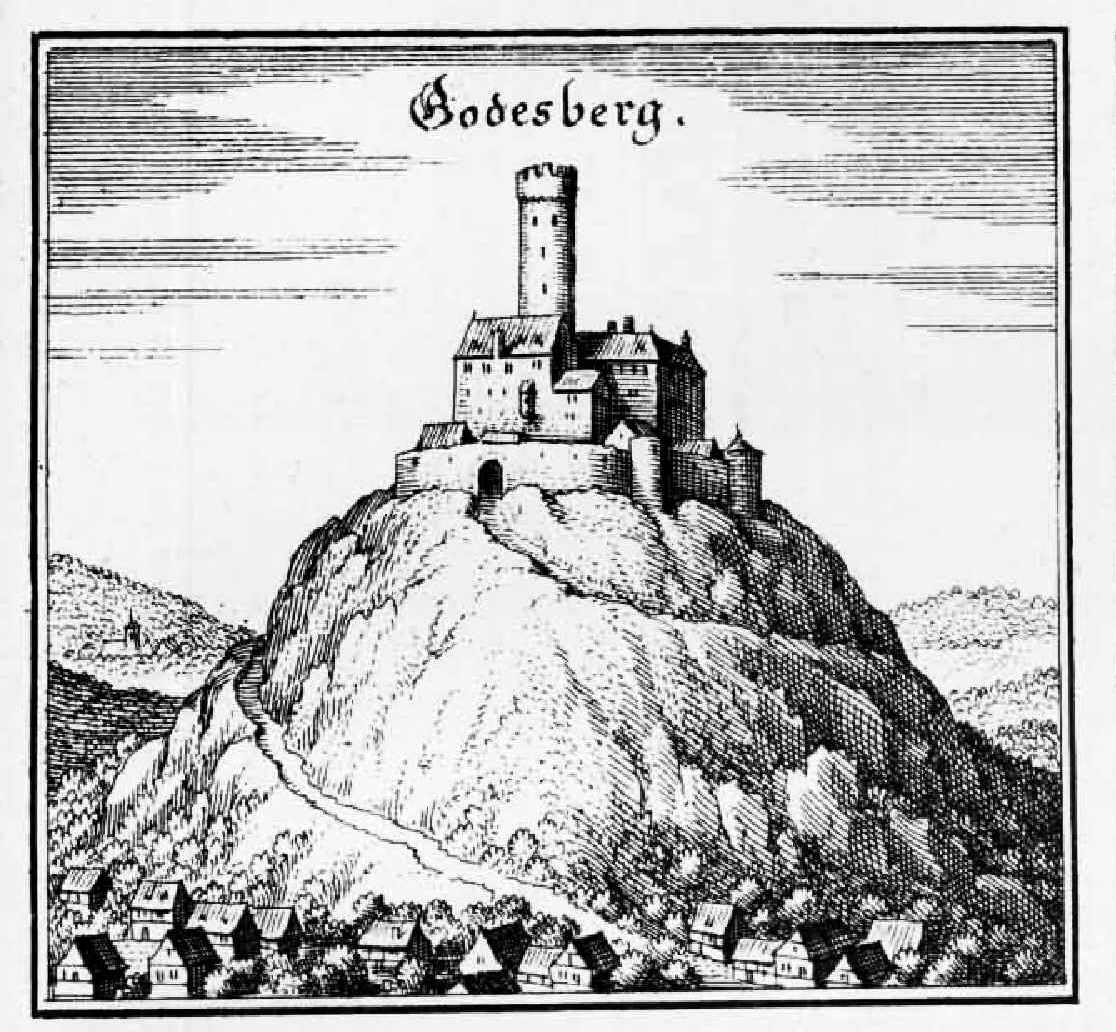
1646 engraving of the Godesberg hill and Godesburg castle as they might have appeared before the castle's destruction

The site has a controversial history. Growing out of the nineteenth-century Heimat movement, historians speculated that in the pre-Christian era, the inhabitants probably used the peak to call to the god Wotan, the god of war, death and the hunt, and other attributes, establishing a custom that led eventually to the erection of a house of prayer on the site. They found early mention of the site in 9th century documents, and again in the 12th century, documents continue to refer to it as Gotensberg, or Gotensperg. first mentioned in documents from the early 8th century, was supposedly built on an old cult site and its name derived from the old Germanic Wotansberg, Woudensberg, or Gotansberg. In the 10th century, documents from the reign of Otto I in 927, and Otto II in 974, suggested that a religious community had been located on the mountain peak, thus the name Gottesberg. From this speculation, the idea emerged that the fort itself was established on an ancient cult site.

== Construction ==
The fortress foundation stones were laid by a vicar upon the order of Dietrich I, the Archbishop of Cologne, who was himself in disputed possession of the Electorate and fighting to keep his position. After Dietrich's death in 1224, his successors finished the fortress; it featured in chronicles of the 13th through 15th centuries as both a symbolic and physical embodiment of the power of the archbishop of Cologne in his many struggles for regional authority with the patricians of the imperial city of Cologne. By the late 14th century, the fortress had become the repository of the Elector's valuables and archives, and by the mid-16th century, was popularly considered the lieblingssitz, or the favorite seat (home), of the Electors.

=== Modifications ===
The fortification had been originally constructed in the medieval style and in the reign of Siegfried II of Westwald (1275–1295) successfully resisted a five-week siege by Count William of Cleves. Successive archbishops continued to improve the fortifications with stronger walls and expanded moats, adding levels to the central Bergfried, which was cylindrical, not square like many medieval donjons, expanded the inner works to include a small residence, dungeons, and chapel, fortified the walls, added a curtain wall, and improved the roads. By the 1580s, it was an elaborate stone fortress, and it had been enhanced partially in the style made popular by Italian military architects. Although the physical location did not permit the star-shaped trace italienne, its cordons of thick, rounded walls and massive iron-studded gates still made it a formidable adversary. Its height, some 400 feet (122 m) above the Rhein (Rhine), on the peak of a steep hill, made artillery fire difficult.

Fortifications such as this, and the star-shaped fortresses more commonly found in the flatter lands of the Dutch Provinces, made warfare both difficult and expensive; victory was not simply a matter of winning a battle over the enemy's army, but of traveling from one fortified and armed city to another and investing time and money in one of two outcomes: ideally, with a show of extraordinary force, convincing the city leaders to surrender the city, or reducing the city to rubble and storming the ruins. In the case of the former, when a city capitulated, it would have to quarter troops at its expense, called execution, but the soldiers would not be permitted to plunder; in the case of the latter, no quarter was given to the defenders.

== See also ==
- Äskulapstein:Roman votive stone found in the Godesburg castle.
