= Nicolaus-Cusanus-Gymnasium Bonn =

School in Bonn, Germany

Nicolaus-Cusanus-Gymnasium

Location
- Gotenstrasse 50; Bonn, 53175; Germany
- Coordinates: 50°41′45″N 7°09′23″E

Information
- School type: Gymnasium
- School number: 166388
- Head of school: Nicole Auen
- Teaching staff: 55
- Enrollment: 597
- Website: https://www.ncg-bonn.eu/

The Nicolaus-Cusanus-Gymnasium (NCG) is a secondary school in Bonn-Bad Godesberg, Germany. Its pupils range from Grade 5 to Grade 12. The main aspects of the school are a bilingual English-German branch and a STEM-focused curriculum. In Grade 5 pupils can choose if they want to be taught bilingual lessons. As of 2024 the school's headteacher is Nicole Auen.
