= Rheinhotel Dreesen =

German hotel

Coordinates: 50.6838°N 7.1756°E

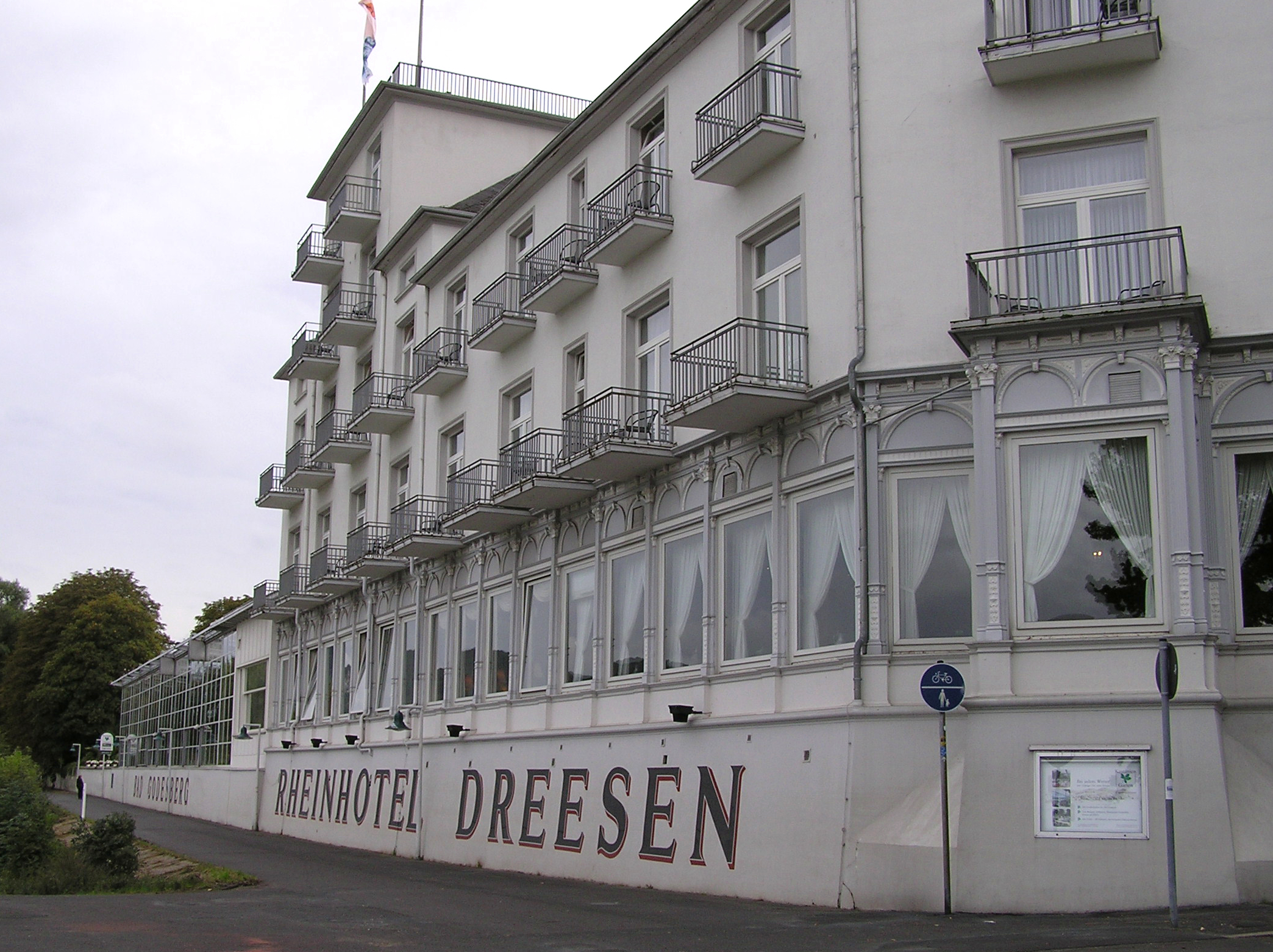
View from the Rhine River (2006)

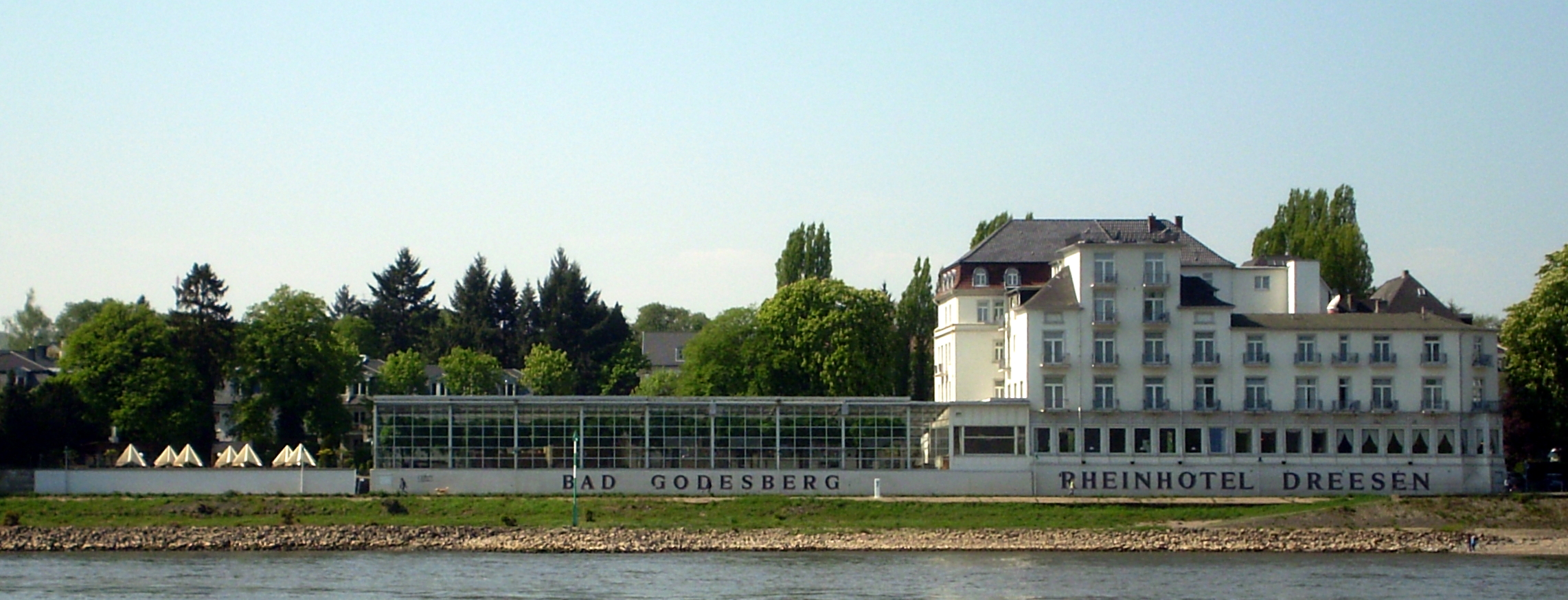
View from the Rhine River (2011)

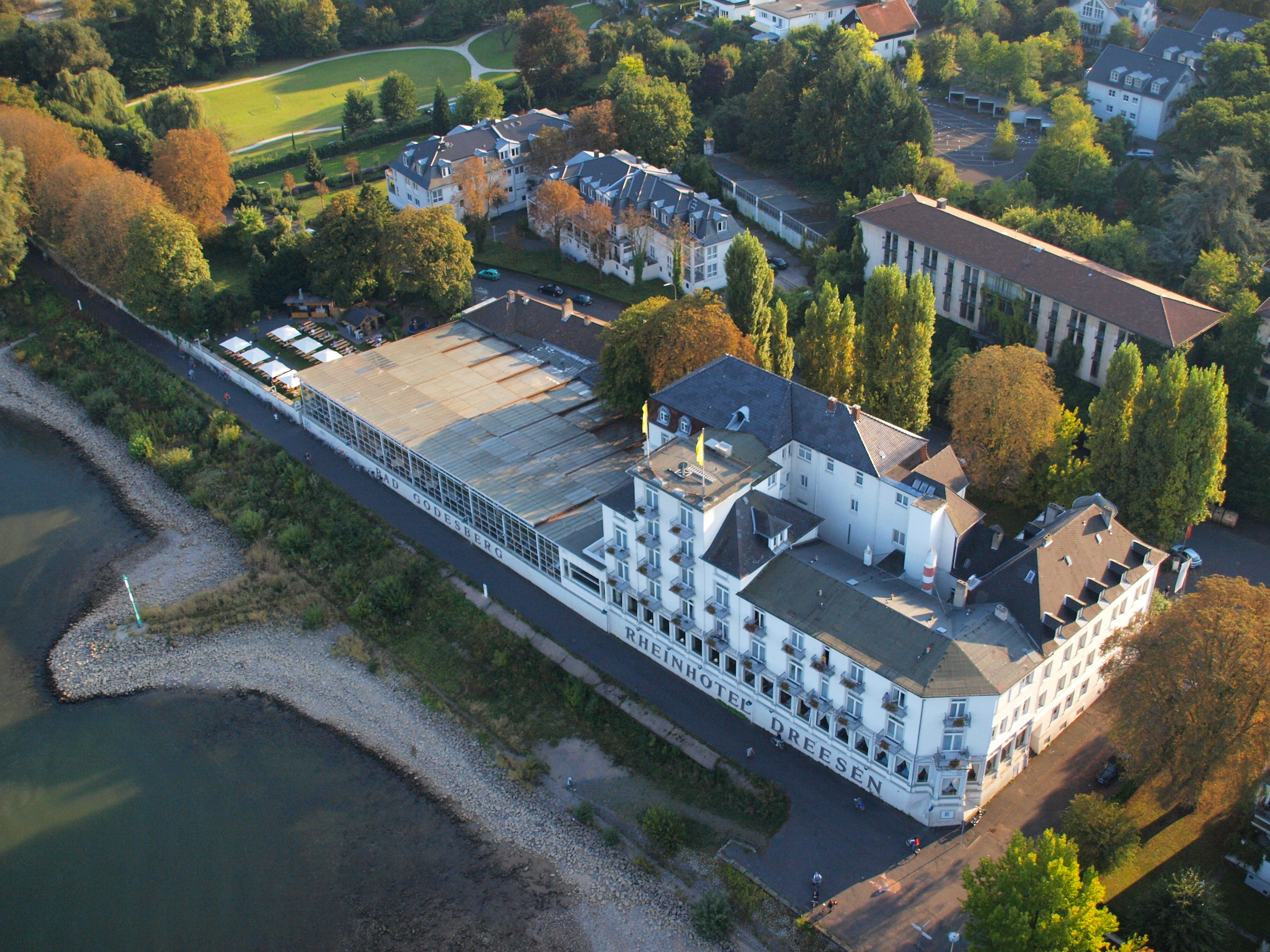
Aerial view (2009)

The Rheinhotel Dreesen is a Hotel in Rüngsdorf, a sub-district of Bad Godesberg, which is a municipal district of the city of Bonn, Germany. The building was established at the end of the 19th century. It is notable for its striking facade, its historical significance and its numerous prominent guests. The hotel is still operated by the original innkeeper family.

== History ==
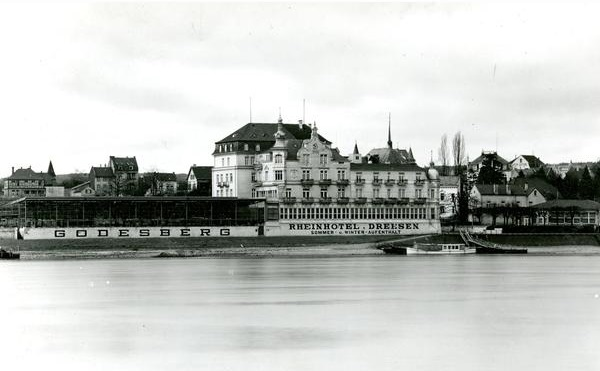
View from the Rhine (1915)

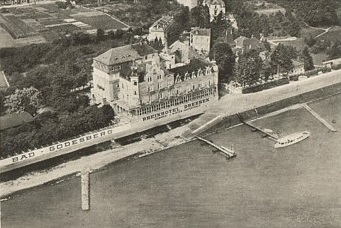
Aerial view (around 1925)

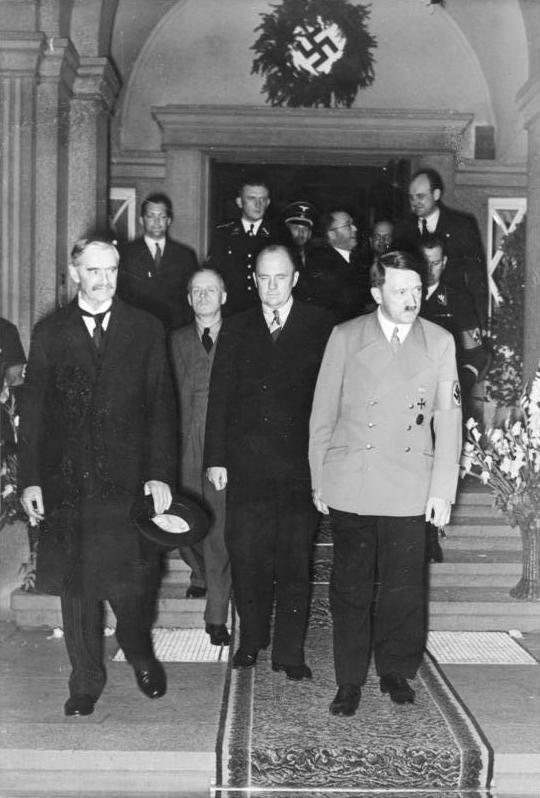
Hitler accompanies prime minister Chamberlain after an evening meeting at the Dreesen Hotel (September 24th 1938)

The hotel was built between 1893 and 1894 by converting a former restaurant on the bank of the Rhine according to the building plans of architect Georg Westen (1851–1921) for the founder of the hotel – Friedrich Dreesen (1858–1912). On August 16, 1894, he received the business license for the new company. The Dreesen family had come to Rüngsdorf in 1770 and had been active in the hospitality business since the middle of the 18th century. The hotel was expanded in a second phase of construction in 1900.

The Dreesen Rheinhotel advertised itself early on with modern quality standards, unique music events, and a location on the river, in an attempt to set itself apart from competitors like the "Hotel Königshof" and the "Godesberger Hof". The reputation of the Hotel grew and brought guests like Crown Prince Wilhelm, President Friedrich Ebert, Paul von Hindenburg, Gustav Stresemann, Walther Rathenau, Charlie Chaplin, Hans Albers, Greta Garbo, and Marlene Dietrich. The hotel was able to withstand the economic challenges of the 1920s and numerous floods. In 1925 the hotel underwent extensive renovations following the architectural plans of Christopher Brüggermann.

At his first visit to the hotel in 1926 Adolf Hitler checked in as a "staatenloser Schriftsteller", meaning "stateless author". He returned there often afterwards. On the night of June 29–30, 1934 Hitler met with Joseph Goebbels and Sepp Dietrich in preparation for the Night of the Long Knives. In September 1938 he moved the negotiations with prime minister Chamberlain regarding the Sudetenland crisis to the Hotel Dreesen. The hotel owner at the time was considered a "Half-Jew" according to Nazi ideology and the Nuremberg laws, and had a Jewish sister-in-law as well as numerous Jewish relatives. Nonetheless, he was able to run his business unmolested. According to an informant of the American journalist Nora Waln, who stayed in the hotel in the summer of 1934 immediately after Hitler, the owner at the time was "a childhood friend of the Führer". William L. Shirer, an American journalist visiting the hotel in 1938, referred to the owner as "an early Nazi crony of Hitler". In 1934, under the direction of local architect Willy Maß, the 2000 m^{2} terrace ("Kastaniengarten") was fitted with an (at that time unique) electric glass roof. At the beginning of the war in 1939 the hotel was seized by the German armed forces and served as a headquarters of the army high command under General Fedor von Bock. In February 1943, it became temporary accommodation for South and Central American diplomats under the French Vichy Regime while continuing to operate as a hotel. After the diplomats' departure in 1944/1945 it was mainly used by French officers. During this time, from April 1944 at the latest, it functioned as a satellite camp of Buchenwald concentration camp under the cover name "Winzerstube" and was under military guard.

In March 1945, General Richard Schimpf moved into the hotel, only to hand over Godesberg to the American troops the next day. The hotel then became the quarters of the American commander-in-chief and later President of the United States, Dwight D. Eisenhower. After July 1945 the confiscated hotel was available as a convalescent home for the British Royal Air Force, and briefly from 1946 for the Belgian armed forces. From December 1946 it served as accommodation for displaced people. After Bonn was established as the seat of government of West Germany in 1949, the hotel was designated as the headquarters of the allied high commissions (France, USA, Great Britain). To accommodate this purpose the state of North Rhine-Westphalia ordered the Federal Capital Office to convert the hotel by equipping it with 110 offices covering an area of 3320 m^{2}. The requisition took place on July 15. By the end of July, half of the 363 refugees previously housed here had been relocated to Niederbreisig. On September 10, the conversion and renovation of the hotel was completed. Contrary to previous plans, it served exclusively as the seat of the French High Commission under André François-Poncet — the first to take up its work in the Bonn area.

The hotel was reopened on November 17, 1952. The Rheinhotel Dreesen accommodated numerous diplomats in the first decade of its resumed operation, before most states opened an official embassy in the Federal Republic of Germany with their own residence.

Now run by the 5th generation of the Dreesen family, the hotel was one of the founding members of the "Ringhotels" hotel partnership in 1973.
