= Independent Bonn International School =

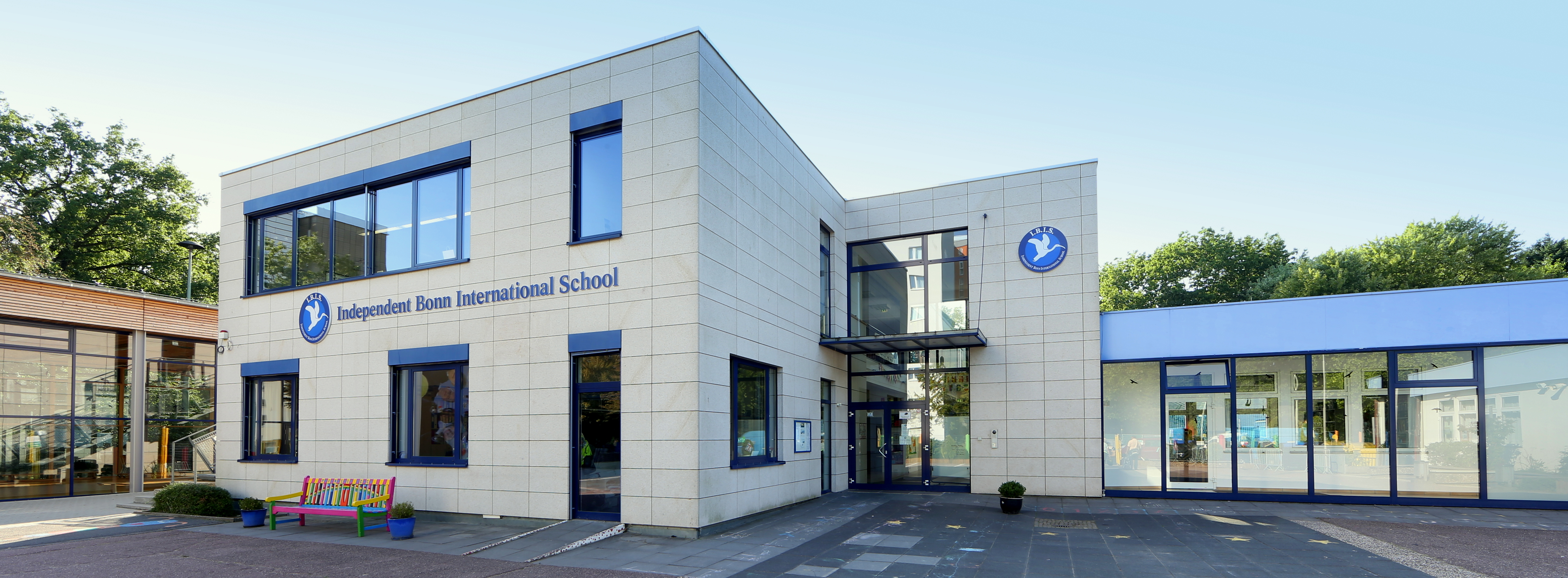
- Independent Bonn International School View
- Tulpenbaumweg 42, 53177 Bonn; North Rhine-Westphalia

Information
- Type: Primary School
- Established: 1963
- Head teacher: Tara O'Shea
- Age range: 3 - 12
- Average class size: 19

Independent Bonn International School (IBIS) is the oldest international school located in Bonn, Germany.

== History ==
IBIS was founded in 1963 by a group of parents and for many years was called the British Embassy Preparatory School (BEPS). When many of the embassies moved to Berlin in 1997, the school changed its name to IBIS to reflect the broad international nature of the school.

=== Location ===
IBIS is located in Heiderhof, a suburb of Bad Godesberg.

=== Educational Basis ===
IBIS is inspected regularly by the Council of British Independent Schools (COBIS), and by the German school authorities. This ensures that the educational standards at IBIS meet both the international and German standards.

Since 2001 IBIS has had the official approval of the German authorities as an "Ersatzschule der Primarstufe". This allows it to prepare children for the German system of education as well as other international destinations.

In 2020, the school became the first in Germany to receive the Carnegie Centre of Excellence for Mental Health in Schools Bronze Award. During their 2022 COBIS inspection, the school was awarded 'Beacon School Status', for their approach to student Wellbeing.

=== International Kindergarten ===
IBIS accepts children from the age of three into their Kindergarten class, a part of their Early Years Foundation Stage provision, which focuses on social development and early literacy and numeracy.

=== Memberships ===
IBIS is a member of the European Council of International Schools (ECIS), the Council of International Schools, the Council of British International Schools (COBIS) and the VDP Verband Deutscher Privatschulen Nordrhein-Westfalen e. V.

=== Website ===
- Official IBIS website
