= Bad Godesberg =

District of Bonn, Germany

- Borough of Bonn
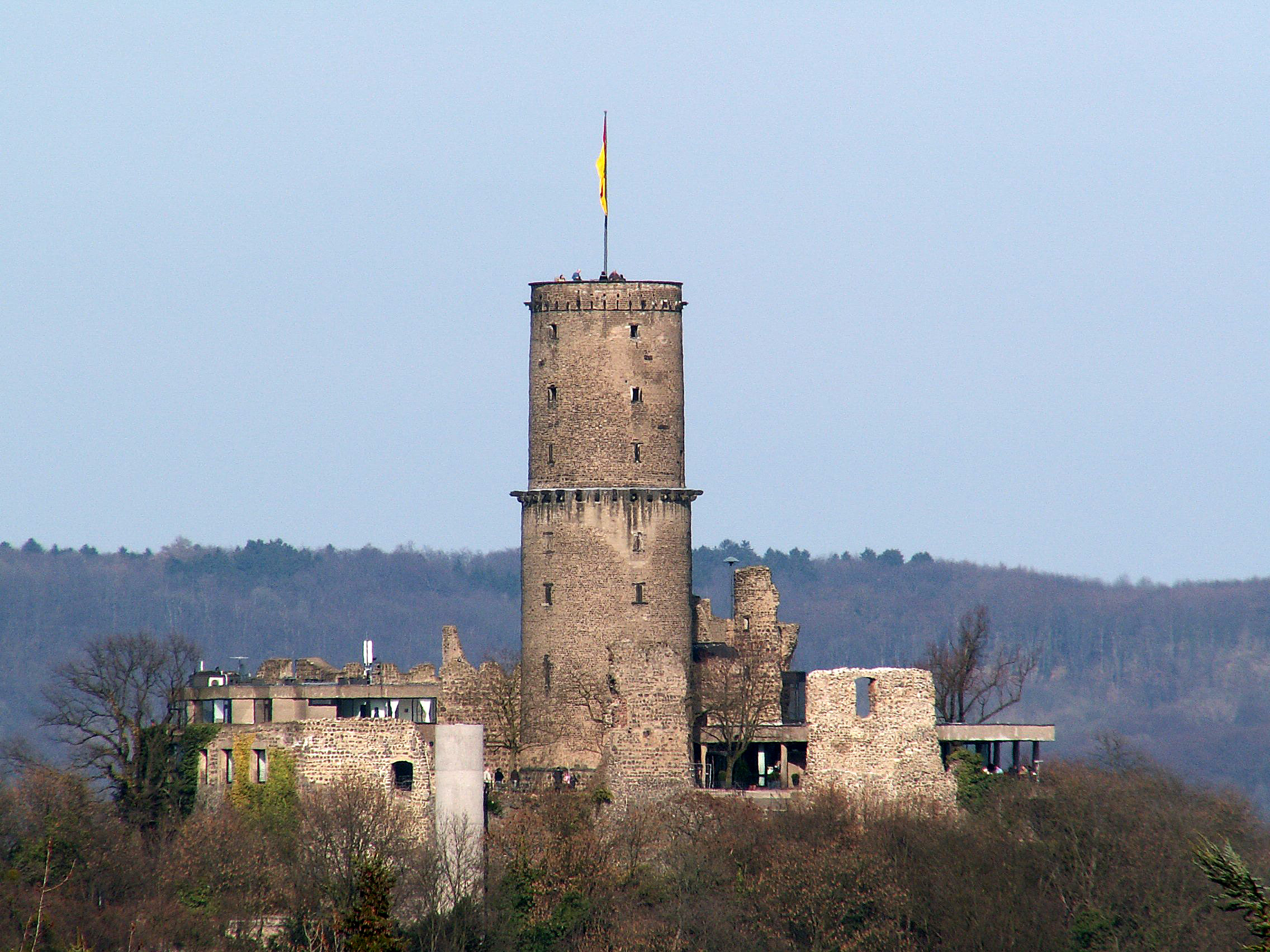
- Godesburg ruins

- Flag Coat of arms

- Bad Godesberg within Bonn
- Interactive map of Bad Godesberg
- Location within Germany Location within North Rhine-Westphalia
- Coordinates: 50°41′N 07°9′E
- Country: Germany
- State: North Rhine-Westphalia
- Admin. region: Cologne
- District: Bonn urban district
- Town: Bonn

Government
  - Mayor: Christoph Jansen (CDU)

Area
  - Total: 31.97 km^{2} (12.34 sq mi)
- Elevation: 46 m (151 ft)

Population (2020-12-31)
  - Total: 76,156
  - Density: 2,382/km^{2} (6,170/sq mi)
- Time zone: UTC+01:00 (CET)
  - Summer (DST): UTC+02:00 (CEST)
- Postal codes: 53173-53179
- Dialling codes: 0228
- Vehicle registration: BN
- Website: Website

Bad Godesberg (Kölsch: Bad Jodesbersch) is a borough (Stadtbezirk) of Bonn, southern North Rhine-Westphalia, Germany. From 1949 to 1999, while Bonn was the capital of the Federal Republic of Germany, most foreign embassies were in Bad Godesberg. Some buildings are still used as branch offices or consulates.

== Geography ==
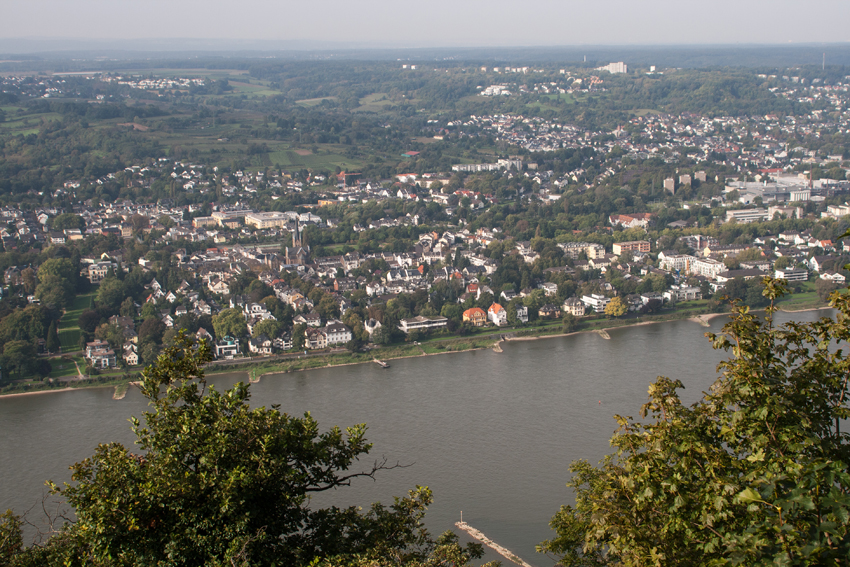
Aerial view of Mehlem, Bad Godesberg

Bad Godesberg is located along the hills and cliffs of the west bank of the Rhine river, in west central Germany. Godesberg is also the name of the steep hill, of volcanic origin, on the top of which are the ruins of the Godesburg, a castle destroyed in 1583 during the Cologne War.

== History ==
The following events occurred, per year:

- 722 - First official record of the town, which was named after a nearby mountain, the Woudenesberg (later Godesberg), a basalt cone where the Ubii, a Germanic tribe, worshipped the god Wotan.
- 1210 - On 15 October, Archbishop of Cologne Dietrich I lays the foundation stone of the Godesburg fortress on the Godesberg mountain.
- 1583 - On 17 December, the Godesburg was destroyed by Bavarian troops after Archbishop Gebhard Truchsess von Waldburg converted to Protestantism (see Cologne War).
- 1792 - Godesberg becomes a spa resort, with the opening of the Redoute, which later saw receptions of the President of Germany.
- 1822 – Godesberg becomes part of the Rhine Province of Prussia
- 1925 - Godesberg is allowed to call itself "Bad" Godesberg, identifying it as a spa.
- 1935 - Bad Godesberg attains the status of a town.
- 1938 - Neville Chamberlain meets with Hitler over the Sudetenland crisis at the Rheinhotel Dreesen in Bad Godesberg. Hitler's demands concerning Czechoslovakia expressed in Godesberg Memorandum.
- 1944–1945 - Bad Godesberg was the location of a Nazi-operated forced labour camp.
- 1945 - On March 8, Bad Godesberg was the first major German urban district to be transferred to Allied forces' control without a battle.
- 1946 – with the disestablishment of Prussia, the town became part of the new Land of North Rhine-Westphalia
- 1959 - The Social Democratic Party of Germany (SPD) decided on a new party program, the Godesberg Program.
- 1969 - Godesberg was incorporated into the city of Bonn. Since that time, it has been referred to as the "posh part of Bonn".

== Infrastructure ==
Bonn-Bad Godesberg station is on the Left Rhine line and the line 16 and 63 of the Bonn Stadtbahn.

Circa 2018 a new police station was being built on former Haribo property.

== Politics ==
=== List of twin cities/sister cities ===
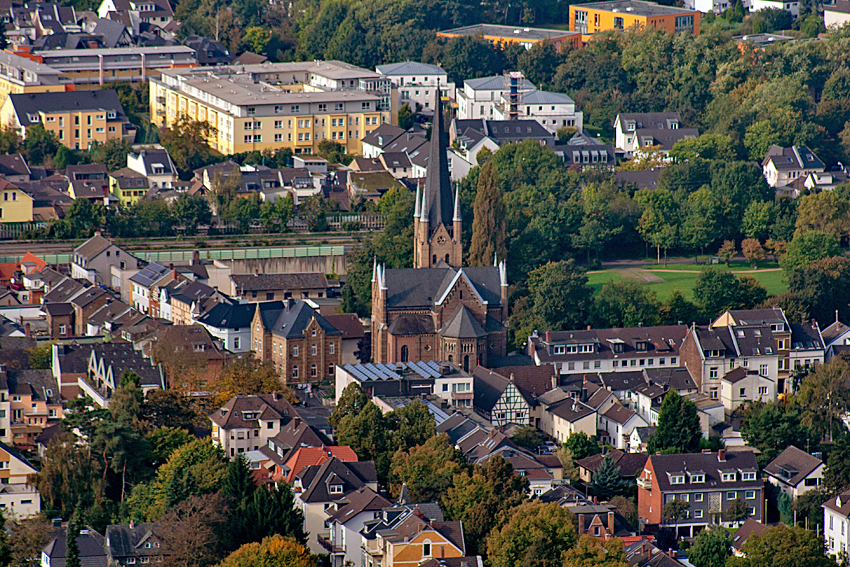
Church of Saint Severin

Bad Godesberg is twinned with:

- Saint-Cloud, France (1957)
- Frascati, Italy (1960)
- Windsor and Maidenhead, England, United Kingdom (1960)
- Kortrijk, Belgium (1964)

=== Friendly cities ===
Bad Godesberg has friendly relations with:

- Steglitz-Zehlendorf (Berlin), Germany (1962)
- Yalova, Turkey (1969)

== Culture and attractions ==
=== Public facilities ===
- Schauspielhaus Bad Godesberg (Theater Bad Godesberg), the biggest theater of Bonn’s city stages
- Kleines Theater im Park (Small Park Theater), venue for theater, boulevard theater, and musicals with few actors
- Haus an der Redoute (House at the Redoute), previously an electoral theater, is nowadays a facility for changing/rotating art galleries
- Piccolo Puppenspiele (Piccolo’s Puppet Show), puppet theater that also travels
- Small Beethoven hall as the headquarters of the Heimatbühne Muffendorf (Home stage of Muffendorf)

=== Bad Godesberg in literature ===
A whole series of literary works take place in Bad Godesberg. The protagonists of Juli Zeh’s novel "Spieltrieb" (Gaming instinct) are students at the school Päda. Occurring locations in the novel are the school and the villa district. Heinrich Böll’s novel "Frauen vor Flußlandschaft" is set in the villa district between Bonn and Bad Godesberg. On October 30 the documentary piece "Zwei Welten" ("Two worlds") by Ingrid Müller-Münch had its premiere as a chamber play. The author explains that it shows Bad Godesberg in the change of time. It is a city where the worlds of "rich German people" and migrants collide. Nine actors perform excerpts from a protocol of mostly young inhabitants of Bad Godesberg, that Müller Münch took record of. In the pre-report of the piece, the Frankfurter Rundschau called it a "Bad-Godesberg-Phänomen" (Bad Godesberg phenomenon). According to Müller-Münch, these two worlds were closer in Bad Godesberg than they were anywhere else.

=== Recurring events ===
- Rhein in Flammen on the first Saturday of May: large firework show and a ship tour from Linz am Rhein along Erpel, Unkel, Remagen, Rheinbreitbach, Rhine island Nonnenwerth at Rolandswerth/Bad Honnef, Bad Godesberg, Königswinter to Rheinaue in Bonn
- FeenCon

Stadtmarketing Bad Godesberg e.V. (city marketing department of Bad Godesberg) organises various events and festivals every year, for example flea and antique markets, a French market, a kids’ rally ("Tag der Kleinen Bad Godesberger"/"Day of the small Bad Godesbergers"), a city party, a Christmas Market, and a street food festival. The 23rd German Fire department day took place in Bad Godesberg from June 21 until June 25, 1961. The first CTIF Games took place in Bad Godesberg, since then the International Association of Fire and Rescue Services CTIF organizes the event every four years in different cities.

=== Rhenish traditions ===
Several Carnival clubs have devoted themselves to the upkeep of Rhenish traditions, especially the Godesberger Stadtsoldatenkorps (city soldier corps), the Fidelen Burggrafen (merry burgraves) and the AKP (Allgemeine Karnevals Gesellschaft, General Carnival Society). The Coordination Committee of each Carnival Association is the FAGK (Festausschuss Godesberger Karneval, Festival Committee of Godesberger Carnival). In the carnival season, the clubs also organize a variety of meetings, and on the carnival Sunday a lavish parade. All clubs engage in youth work.

== Education ==
=== Secondary schools ===
- Nicolaus-Cusanus-Gymnasium (NCG)
- Aloisiuskolleg (AKO), partnerschool of the CFG
- Amos-Comenius-Gymnasium Bonn (AMOS/ACG) (DE)
- Clara-Fey-Gymnasium (CFG), partnerschool of the AKO
- Konrad-Adenauer-Gymnasium (KAG) (DE)
- Pädagogium Godesberg - Otto-Kühne-Schule (PÄDA)

=== International schools ===
- Bonn International School (BIS)
- Independent Bonn International School (IBIS)
- King Fahd Academy (closed)

== Notable residents ==
- Paul Kemp (1896–1953), stage and film actor
- Klaus Barbie (1913–1991), SS and Gestapo functionary during WW II, war criminal known as "the butcher of Lyon".
- Michaela Endler (born 1945), former cross-country skier
- Harald Weinberg (born 1957), politician (The Linke)
- Johannes B. Kerner (born 1964), television host and journalist.
- Margret Dieck (1941 – 1996) was born here and became a noted gerontologist

== Trivia ==
- John le Carré's novel The Little Drummer Girl begins with the bombing of the house of the Israeli labour attaché in Bad Godesberg.
