= Margret Fusbahn =

German aviator (1907–2001)

Margret Fusbahn (née Billwiller, 1907 – 2001), was a German aviator. She flew in airshows, undertook long-haul flights from Europe to Africa and in 1930, she broke the international altitude record for light-aircraft when she reached 15,900 feet.

Fusbahn's husband, Ludwig Werner Fusbahn, was also an aviator. The pair were nicknamed "the flying couple". The marriage ended in divorce in 1938 and Margret Fusbahn left Switzerland. She died in Portugal in 2001 as Rosa Margareta Rodriguez.

The town of Sindelfingen has a street named after her: Margret Fusbahn Straße.
