= Margret Stender =

German volleyball player (born 1947)

Personal information
- Nationality: German
- Born: 18 February 1947 (age 78); Münster, Germany

Sport
- Sport: Volleyball

Margret Stender (born 18 February 1947) is a German volleyball player. She competed in the women's tournament at the 1972 Summer Olympics.
