= Heinrich Joseph Floss =

German catholic theologian and church historian

Heinrich Joseph Floß, or Floss (29 July 1819–4 May 1881), was a church historian and moral theologian in the 19th century. As a professor of theology at the University of Bonn, he edited a collection of the work of John Duns Scotus, the Franciscan theologian. During the Kulturkampf, Floss was constrained by the anti-Catholic legislation.

== Education ==
He was born in the village of Wormersdorf on 29 July 1819. At the Gymnasium Munstereifel, he received excellent marks, following which he began his studies in Catholic theology and history at the University of Bonn. He was ordained as a priest in 1842 and served as chaplain in his first years as a priest, in Bilk, near Düsseldorf. Here, under the tutelage of the pastor, a man named Binterim, he broadened his studies. He went to the University of Bonn and in 1846 wrote his dissertation in church history. Before he undertook his larger research project, he traveled to Rome and Naples. On his return journey, he also visited Vienna, Prague, Munich and Berlin.

== Career ==
He received his doctorate of philosophy from the University of Bonn in 1846, and in November 1847 he began work as an adjunct professor (German: privatdozent) there, and as a lecturer in the Theological Seminary. On 14 March 1854, he was promoted to associate professor, and on 19 October 1858 to full professor of moral theology. He dedicated himself with great zeal to his instructional duties and understood the dependence and lives of his many students, to whom he was both fatherly friend and adviser.

Initially, his scholarship delved into the early Christian writings, such as his edited epistles of Macarii Aegyptii epistolæ, homiliarum loci, preces, ad fidem Vaticani, Vindobonensium, Berolinensis, which was published in 1853, and translated into several languages (Modern Greek, Latin, French He was also interested in the emerging Marian phenomenon, and his study of the appearances of Mary, published in 1850, explored the 14th-century manuscripts at the Klosterneuburg (German: Neuburg Priory), near Vienna. He edited documents relating to Ottonian Germany and the papal election of Leo as Pope Leo VIII before the death of Pope John XII in Die Papstwahl unter den Ottonen With this, he began a long interest in religious conflict in the lower Rhineland, resulting in several publications relating to the region's religious turmoil, such as the Cologne War and the religious strife in the United Duchies of Jülich-Cleves-Berg.

By German Unification in 1871, he was the single Catholic professor in Holy Orders at the University of Bonn. He was working on a history of the religious conflict in the Duchy of Cleves when he died: Zum Clevisch-Märkischen Kirchenstreit. (Eine Erinnerung aus der früheren Geschichte des Kulturkampfes) was published posthumously by Hanstein, in 1883. His Eroberung des Schlosses Poppelsdorf, Sprengung und Erstürmung der Burg Godesberg und Einnahme der kurfürstlichen Residenzstadt Bonn. November 1583— Februar 1584 remains one of the standard works on the religious strife in the northwestern German states in the late Reformation.

== Publications ==
- Die Papstwahl unter den Ottonen, nebst ungedruckten Papst- und Kaiserurkunden des IX. und X. Jahrhunderts, darunter das Privilegium Leos VIII. für Otto I. Freiburg im Breisgau, 1858.
- System der katholischen Moraltheologie : ein Grundriss für Vorlesungen. Bonn, 1869.
- Romreise des Abtes Markward von Prüm und Uebertragung der hh. Chrysanthus un Daria nach Münstereifel im Jahre 844. Köln: Heberle, 1869.

His collection of books on the Reformation was given to the Imperial library in Berlin.
