= Margret Dieck =

German gerontologist (1941–1996)

- Born: July 1941; Bad Godesberg, Bonn, Germany
- Died: 28 November 1996 (aged 55); Germany
- Education: University of Cologne
- Known for: Contributions to social gerontology; Lebenslagekonzept
- Scientific career
- Fields: Gerontology, social policy
- Workplaces: Deutsches Zentrum für Altersfragen (DZA)

Margret Dieck (July 1941 – 28 November 1996) was a German gerontologist and is considered one of the country's distinguished representatives of gerontology, especially of the socio-politico-scientific orientation. She was an influential member of the "Kölner Schule" in gerontology.

== Early life and education ==
Margret Dieck was born in Bad Godesberg, a district of Bonn, to a family of doctors. After finishing school, Dieck studied economic and social sciences in Cologne, and finished her studies as a diploma economist. Her first job was an academic associate's position at the Forschungsinstitut für Einkommenspolitik und Soziale Sicherung (research institute for income policy and social security) in Cologne. Her first scientific works were on the theory of social regulation, social cybernetics and on the economic theory of statutory health insurance.

== Career ==
In 1966, Dieck moved to an academic assistant's position at the Forschungsstätte für öffentliche Unternehmen (research institution for public enterprises) at the University of Cologne. At the same time, she assumed responsibility for business operations. After one year, in 1967, she became an academic associate at the Seminar für Sozialpolitik und Genossenschaftswesen (seminar for social policy and cooperative system) at the University of Cologne. In this period, Dieck focused on financing and the promotion of public enterprises and the economic operating of labour unions. Dieck achieved the title "Dr. rer. pol." (Doctor rerum politicarum – Doctor of political and economic sciences) in the same year.

Dieck was concerned with the living situation of weak and endangered persons – partly motivated by the respective preliminary work of Gerhard Weisser and Otto Blume. The results of studying living conditions for the elderly are the basis for Dieck's special interest in the social subjects of gerontology. Subsequently, she moved to the Kuratorium Deutsche Altershilfe (KDA, curatorship of German seniority age) in 1969. There, she initiated the foundation for an institute for senior housing, which she led from 1970 until 1974, when she departed for the Deutsches Zentrum für Altersfragen e.V. (DZA, German centre for aging questions).

During her time at the Kuratorium Deutsche Altershilfe (KDA), Margret Dieck contributed to several research projects. In 1974, she conducted a survey on the institutional treatment of age-related illnesses and the extent to which costs were covered by statutory health insurance. The study served as a reference work for experts and later informed reforms to long-term care financing in Germany during the mid-1990s.

Dieck also contributed to a 1975 report commissioned by the German Trade Union Federation (Deutscher Gewerkschaftsbund, DGB) on the living conditions of older people. This publication represented one of the first comprehensive socio-political analyses of the situation of the elderly in the Federal Republic of Germany and reflected a shift in trade union approaches to social policy at the time.

In 1974, Dieck joined the German Centre of Gerontology (Deutsches Zentrum für Altersfragen, DZA), where she served as head of the department for applied research and academic advisory services. In 1977, she became academic director, a position she held until her death in 1996.

=== Academic work ===
Almost all of Dieck's academic work surrounds the topic of elderly social equality. She suggested theories and provided bases for implementation. Dieck aimed to standardise the social protection and security of the elderly with the social protection of all other population groups.

Dieck's "Sozialpolitik für ältere Menschen" (Social Policy for the Elderly) was published with Gerhard Naegele in 1978. It is considered a programmatic foundation of a socio-politico-scientific research area in social gerontology. Another notable work is "Wohnen und Wohnumfeld älterer Menschen in der Bundesrepublik", on living conditions of the elderly in Germany, published in 1979.

Dieck has also published works on women and aging, family relations in higher age, sanitary and custodial care of the elderly, poverty and wealth in the elderly, elderly employees, retirement and work-related "disposal" in higher age, nursing care insurance, and social services and their financing.

== Board memberships and philanthropy ==
Although she was fully engaged in her work, Margret Dieck would find spare time for honorary work. For several years, she was, along with Siegfried Gößling, chairman of the department VI of the German Society for Gerontology. From 1984 to 1986, she held the position of its vice president, together with Ursula Lehr and Ingeborg Falck.

Furthermore, Dieck was member of the expert committee on senior citizen policy of the AWO ("Arbeiterwohlfahrt" – Workers' Welfare Association) Federal Association. She was involved in the development of the 2nd seniority plan of the Federal State of Nordrhein-Westfalen and in the surveys on which this plan is based. She was a member of the expert committee for the development of the first aging report of the Bundesregierung (German government) and expert in the investigation commission "Demographischer Wandel" (demographic change) of the German Bundestag (parliament). On top of that, she was a member of the curatorship and the academic advisory board of the German research company for gerontology.

== Death ==
On 28 November 1996, Margret Dieck died after a short, severe illness.

== Publications ==
- Arbeitsgruppe Fachbericht über Probleme des Alterns (1982): Altwerden in der Bundesrepublik Deutschland: Geschichte – Situationen – Perspektiven. Beiträge zur Gerontologie und Altenarbeit; 40/I-III. Berlin: DZA-Eigenverlag.
- Backes, G./Dieck, M./Naegele, G. (1985): Ziele und Grundsätze einer modernen Altenpolitik. In: Theorie und Praxis der sozialen Arbeit; 12; S. 410–418.
- Dieck, M. (1979): Wohnen und Wohnumfeld älterer Menschen in der Bundesrepublik. Heidelberg: Quelle & Meyer.
- Dieck, M. (1980): Residential and Community Provisions for the Frail Elderly in Germany: Current Issues and Their History
- Dieck, M. (1991): Altenpolitik. In: Oswald, W.D. et al. (Hg.): Gerontologie. 2. Auflage. Stuttgart, Berlin, Köln: Kohlhammer; S. 23–37.
- Dieck, M./Naegele, G. (Hg.) (1978): Sozialpolitik für ältere Menschen. Heidelberg: Quelle & Meyer.
- Dieck, M./Naegele, G. (1989): Die neuen Alten – Soziale Ungleichheiten vertiefen sich. In: Karlf, F./Tokarski, W. (Hg.): Die "neuen" Alten. Beiträge der XVII. Jahrestagung der Deutschen Gesellschaft für Gerontologie, Kassel 22–24 September 1988. Kasseler Gerontologische Schriften; 6. Kassel: Gesamthochschulbibliothek; S. 167–181.
- Dieck, M./Naegele, G. (1993): "Neue Alte" und alte soziale Ungleichheiten – Vernachlässigte Dimensionen in der Diskussion des Altersstrukturwandels. In: Naegele, G./Twes, H.P. (Hg.): Lebenslagen im Strukturwandel des Alters. Opladen: Westdeutscher Verlag; S. 43–60.
- Kuratorium Deutsche Altershilfe (KDA) (1974): Gutachten über die stationäre Behandlung von Krankheiten im Alter und über die Kostenübernahme durch die gesetzlichen Krankenkassen. Köln: KDA-Eigenverlag.
- Wirtschafts- und Sozialwissenschaftliches Institut des Deutschen Gewerkschaftsbundes (WSI) (1975): Die Lebenslage älterer Menschen in der Bundesrepublik Deutschland. Analyse der Mängel und Vorschläge zur Verbesserung. Köln: Bund-Verlag.
