= Edict of Restitution =

1629 edict of Emperor Ferdinand II

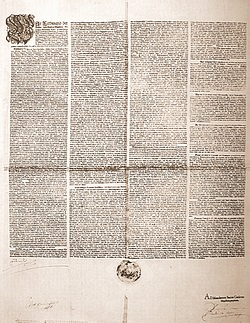
Edict of Restitution (copy)

The Edict of Restitution was proclaimed by Ferdinand II, Holy Roman Emperor in Vienna, on 6 March 1629, eleven years into the Thirty Years' War. Following Catholic military successes, Ferdinand hoped to restore control of land to that specified in the Peace of Augsburg (1555). That treaty's "Ecclesiastical Reservation" had prohibited further secularization of lands held by the Catholic church after 1555, disallowing any transfer of such lands to Protestant control. However, as the Holy Roman Empire descended into the Thirty Years' War, weak emperors had been unable to enforce this provision against Protestant encroachments.

== Background ==
The Diet of Speyer (1529) introduced the principle of cuius regio, eius religio: in essence, agreeing to disagree within the Holy Roman Empire. With that principle confirmed by the Peace of Augsburg, large-scale violence between Lutherans and Catholics in Germany was temporarily avoided.

Some Protestant princes interpreted this principle to mean that the Peace of Augsburg allowed secularization of lands held under Catholic church officials who converted to Protestantism. With the Emperors unable to enforce an interpretation more favorable to them, lands traditionally held by the Catholic church continued to be secularized in this way after the Peace of Augsburg.

In Europe at this time, and in particular the German states within the Holy Roman Empire, control over land and its inheritance was frequently contested, as it was the main source of both power and wealth. Noble families sought to control as much land within the extended family as possible, including by appointing younger sons prince-bishops or prince-abbots. This system created strong incentives to convert to Protestantism and secularize land, thereby seizing control of it from the Catholic Church.

== The Edict ==
The "Edict of Restitution" attempted to retroactively enforce Ferdinand's interpretation of the "Ecclesiastical Reservation" of the Augsburg treaty, effectively undoing changes in control over large areas of land. This had a strong polarizing effect, causing the approximately 1,800 states of the Holy Roman Empire to form disparate, violently opposed blocs.

If fully effected, it would have changed the rulers of the already secularized Archbishoprics of Bremen and Magdeburg, 12 bishoprics, and over 100 religious houses throughout the German states. What was implemented resulted in a great transfer of power and property from the Protestants to the Catholics, compounding a divisive religious struggle with conflict for dynastic power among many smaller German princes, who might otherwise have stayed neutral.

This dramatic expansion in the scope and stakes of the Thirty Years' War was very destructive to Germany's lands and people, as mercenary armies marched through neutral states or ravaged them in the course of their foraging expeditions. Tens of thousands of Protestants fled to Protestant-controlled states, generally broadening the war. Central Germany was ravaged repeatedly, probably losing between 25% and 50% of its pre-war population because the competing armies continually seized food, causing widespread famine and deaths.

In northeastern Germany, where Ferdinand's power had been weakest, Ferdinand appointed Imperial administrators to take control of the secularized states and cities, re-establishing Imperial authority in an area that had been highly autonomous for a century. Ferdinand's role grew and his kingdom was deemed to be more powerful. Many princes opposed this, but had no immediate means of resisting it, with the Coalition destroyed and Wallenstein keeping an army of 134,000 troops in the field to enforce Imperial authority. French alarm at the threat a united Empire could pose ultimately led to French intervention in the war.

Wallenstein personally disliked the Edict, as it interfered with the region he considered his own, but he did his duty for the emperor to the fullest, stating that "he would teach the Electors manners. They must be dependent on the emperor, not the emperor on them." The princes responded by joining the effort of Maximilian of Bavaria to compel Ferdinand to dismiss Wallenstein. Their chance came in 1630, when Ferdinand called a meeting of the Electors in Regensburg because he wanted his son Ferdinand elected King of the Romans (future Holy Roman Emperor). Ferdinand needed their cooperation to approve his son as successor. Ferdinand also hoped to persuade the Electors to approve greater direct Imperial involvement in European wars.

John George I of Saxony and George William of Brandenburg (both Protestant) did not attend the meeting, in protest against the Edict. The Electors who were present concluded that they had little to gain from additional involvement in the wars, and Maximilian asked Ferdinand for the dismissal of Wallenstein. To win over the Electors, Ferdinand removed Wallenstein in August 1630, allowing him to resign to save face. The dismissal of the most powerful military figure in Europe was a major victory for the Electors, and the Regensburg conclave is considered a defeat for Ferdinand.

In July 1630, Gustavus Adolphus landed in Pomerania with 4,000 men in response to the persecution of the Protestants. Without Wallenstein, Ferdinand had to turn to Maximillian and Tilly to stop the new threat. This turned the tide of the Thirty Years' War.

The Edict of Restitution was effectively revoked by the terms of the Peace of Prague (1635). Led by Cardinal Dietrichstein, 22 theologians, mostly Dominicans and Capuchins led by Don Diego Quiroga, voted in favor of its repeal. A minority of Jesuits led by Lamormaini voted against repeal.
