= Declaratio Ferdinandei =

Clause in the Peace of Augsburg

Peace of Augsburg
- Date: 1555
- Location: Augsburg
- Participants: Ferdinand, King of the Romans acting for Charles V. Delegates from the Imperial Estates
- Outcome: 1. The principle of cuius regio, eius religio established religious conformity within a single state. Two confessions of faith were acceptable: Catholicism or the Augsburg Confession (Lutheranism). Any other expression of faith was heretical.; 2. The principle of reservatum ecclesiasticum protected religious conformity within the ecclesiastical estates, but it did not clearly state how this was to be protected.; 3. The Declaratio Ferdinandei granted certain exemptions to the principle of cuius regio, eius religio to some knights, sovereign families, and imperial cities.

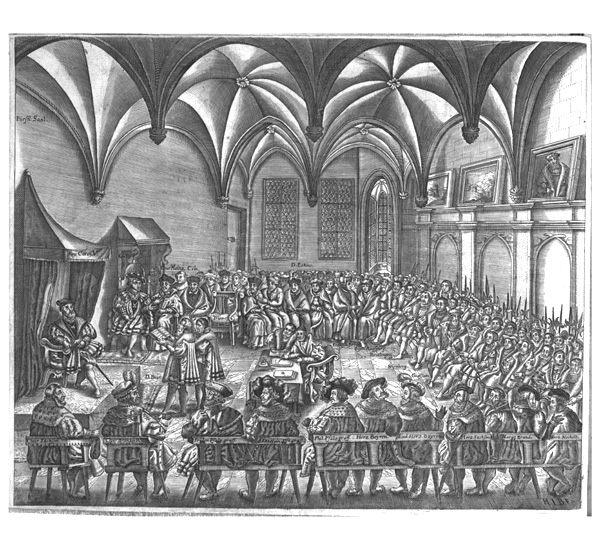
Representatives from the German estates discuss the possibility of a religious peace.

The Declaratio Ferdinandei (English: Declaration of Ferdinand) was a clause in the Peace of Augsburg, signed in 1555 to end conflicts between Catholics and Protestants within the Holy Roman Empire. The Peace created the principle of Cuius regio, eius religio (Latin for "whose realm, his religion"), which meant that the religion of the ruler decided the religion of the inhabitants. The Declaratio Ferdinandei exempted knights and some of the cities under the jurisdiction of an ecclesiastical prince if they had practiced Lutheranism for some time (Lutheranism was the only branch of Protestantism recognized under the Peace). The provision was not publicized as part of the treaty, and was kept secret for almost two decades.

After Catholic victories early in the Thirty Years' War, the Declaratio Ferdinandei was overturned in the Edict of Restitution of 1629, which was part of Ferdinand II's master plan to reconvert the Holy Roman Empire to Catholicism. The overturning of the Declaratio Ferdinandei and other religious persecution helped rekindle the Thirty Years' War, changing it from an internal conflict within the Holy Roman Empire into an international religious war.

== See also ==
- Peace of Augsburg
- Reservatum ecclesiasticum
