= Cuius regio, eius religio =

Historical legal principle

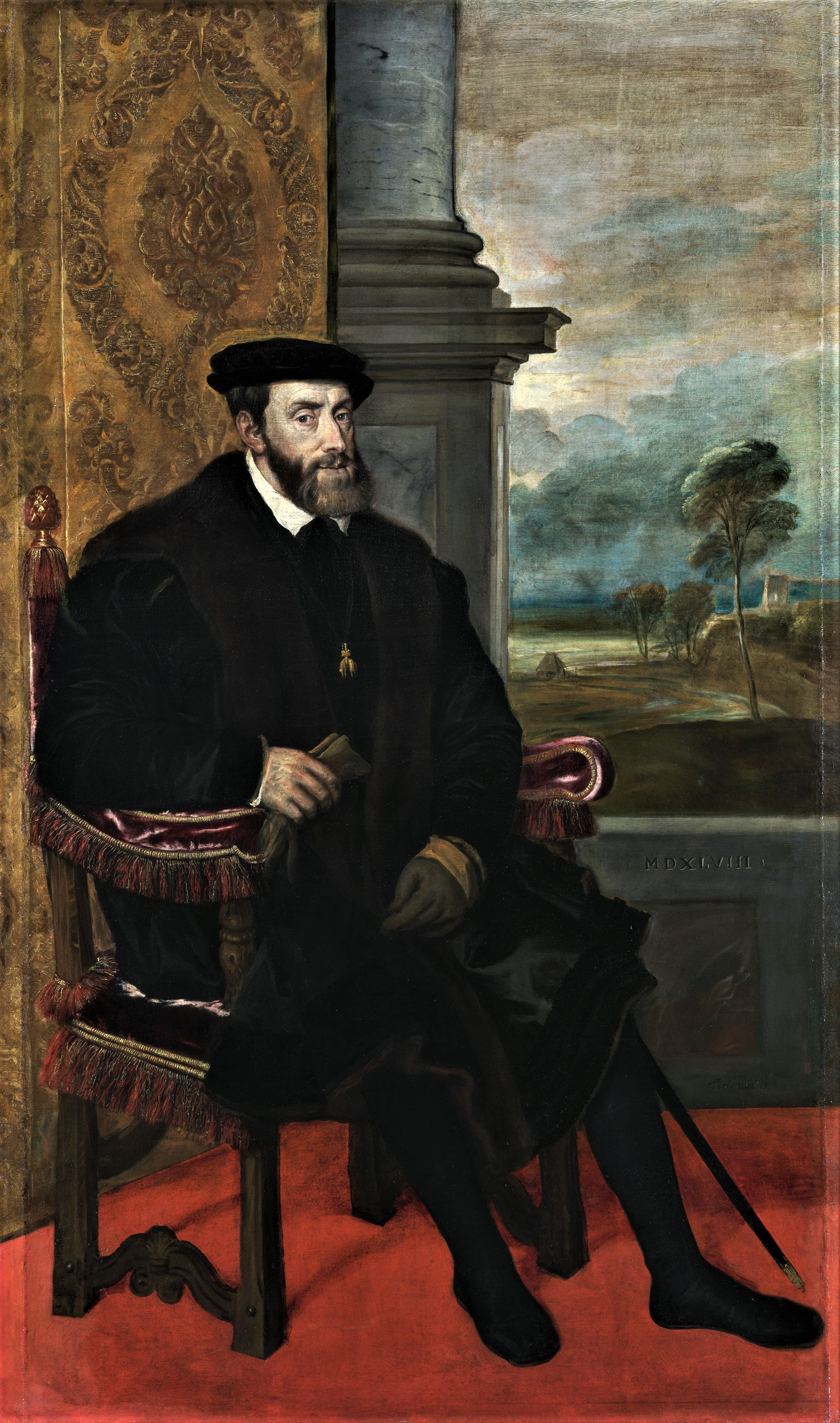
Charles V, Holy Roman Emperor and King of Spain, instructed his brother to settle disputes relating to religion and territory at the Diet of Augsburg in 1555.

Cuius regio, eius religio (Ecclesiastical Latin: [ˈku.jus ˈre.d͡ʒi.o ˈe.jus reˈli.d͡ʒi.o]) is a Latin phrase which literally means "whose realm, their religion" – meaning that the religion of the ruler was to dictate the religion of those ruled. This legal principle marked a major development in the collective (if not individual) freedom of religion within Western civilization. Before tolerance of individual religious divergences became accepted, most statesmen and political theorists took it for granted that religious diversity was wrong and/or weakened a state – and particularly weakened ecclesiastically transmitted control and monitoring in a state. The principle of "cuius regio" was a compromise in the conflict between this paradigm of statecraft and the emerging trend toward religious pluralism (coexistence within a single territory) developing throughout the German-speaking lands of the Holy Roman Empire. It permitted assortative migration of adherents to two religious groups, Roman Catholic and Lutheran, eliding other confessions.

At the Peace of Augsburg of 1555, which ended a period of armed conflict between Roman Catholic and Protestant forces within the Holy Roman Empire, the rulers of the German-speaking states and the Holy Roman Emperor, Charles V, agreed to accept this principle.

== Religious divisions in the Empire ==
Prior to the 16th century and after the Great Schism, there had been one dominant faith in Western and Central European Christendom, and that was the Roman Catholic faith. Heretical sects that arose during that period, such as the Cathars and Waldenses, were either quickly extinguished or made irrelevant. Chief figures during the later period, prominently being John Hus and Martin Luther, at first called for the reform of the Catholic Church, but not necessarily a rejection of the faith per se. Later on, Luther's movement broke away from the Catholic Church and formed the Lutheran denomination. Initially dismissed by the Holy Roman Emperor Charles V as an inconsequential argument between monks, the idea of a religious reformation accentuated controversies and problems in many of the territories of the Holy Roman Empire, which became engulfed in the ensuing controversy. The new Protestant theology galvanized social action in the German Peasants' War (1524–1526), which was brutally repressed and the popular political and religious movement crushed. In 1531, fearful of a repetition of similar suppression against themselves, several Lutheran princes formed the Schmalkaldic League, an alliance through which they agreed to protect themselves and each other from territorial encroachment, and which functioned as a political alliance against Catholic princes and armies.

It was broadly understood by princes and Catholic clergy alike that growing institutional abuses within the Catholic Church hindered the practices of the faithful. In 1537, Pope Paul III had called a council to examine the abuses and to suggest and implement reforms. In addition, he instituted several internal reforms. Despite these efforts, and the cooperation of Charles V, rapprochement of the Protestants with Catholicism foundered on different concepts of ecclesiology and the principle of justification. In the same year, the Schmalkaldic League called its own council, and posited several precepts of faith; Luther was present, but too ill to attend the meetings. When the delegates met again, this time in Regensburg in 1540–41, representatives could agree on the doctrine of faith and justification, but not on the number of sacraments, especially whether or not confession/absolution was sacramental, and they differed widely on the definition of "church". Catholic and Lutheran adherents seemed further apart than ever; in only a few towns and cities were Lutherans and Catholics able to live together in even a semblance of harmony. By 1548, political disagreements overlapped with religious issues, making any kind of agreement seem remote.

In 1548 Charles declared an interreligio imperialis (also known as the Augsburg Interim) through which he sought to find some common ground. This effort succeeded in alienating Protestant and Catholic princes and the Curia; even Charles, whose decree it was, was unhappy with the political and diplomatic dimensions of what amounted to half of a religious settlement. The 1551–52 sessions convened by Pope Julius III at the Catholic Council of Trent restated and reaffirmed Catholic teaching and condemned anew the Protestants. The Council played an important part in the reform of the Catholic Church in the 17th and 18th centuries.

== Augsburg Diet ==
Peace of Augsburg
- Date: 1555
- Location: Augsburg
- Participants: Ferdinand, King of the Romans acting for Charles V. Delegates from the Imperial Estates
- Outcome: 1. The principle Cuius regio, eius religio allowed princes to adopt either Catholicism or the Lutheran Augsburg Confession and enforce religious conformity within their state.; 2. The principle of reservatum ecclesiasticum ruled that ecclesiastical princes would have to relinquish their rule if they converted to another religion, ensuring the territory to stay Catholic.; 3. The Declaratio Ferdinandei protected the religious freedom of Protestants living in ecclesiastical principalities but was not enshrined as binding law.

Catholic and Protestant ideology seemed further apart than ever. Charles' interim solution satisfied no one. He ordered a general Diet in Augsburg at which the various states would discuss the religious problem and its solution (this should not be confused with the Diet of Augsburg in 1530). He himself did not attend, and delegated authority to his brother, Ferdinand, to "act and settle" disputes of territory, religion and local power. At the conference, Ferdinand cajoled, persuaded and threatened the various representatives into agreement on three important principles: cuius regio, eius religio, ecclesiastical reservation, and the Declaration of Ferdinand.

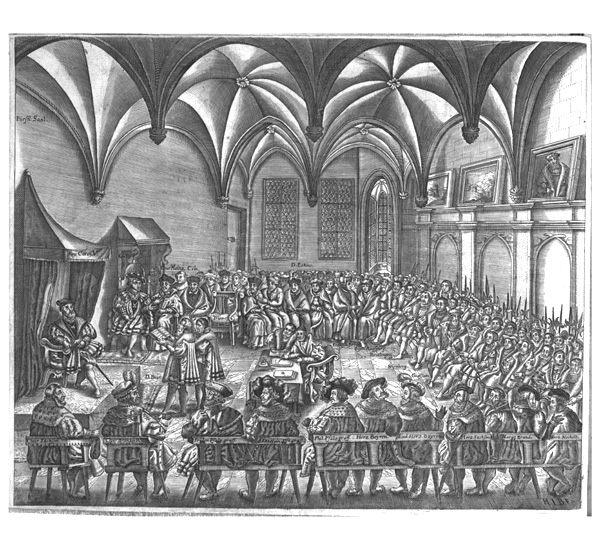
Representatives of the German estates at the Augsburg conference discuss the possibilities of a religious peace.

== Cuius regio, eius religio ==
The principle of cuius regio, eius religio provided for internal religious unity within a state: The religion of the prince became the religion of the state and all its inhabitants. Those inhabitants who could not conform to the prince's religion were allowed to leave, an innovative idea in the 16th century; this principle was discussed at length by the various delegates, who finally reached agreement on the specifics of its wording after examining the problem and the proposed solution. Cuius regio, eius religio went against earlier Catholic teaching, which held that the kings should faithfully obey the pope. This obedience was thought to produce greater fruits of cooperation and less political infighting and fewer church divisions. The phrase cuius regio, eius religio was coined in 1582 by the legist Joachim Stephani (1544–1623) of the University of Greifswald.

== Second and third principles of Augsburg Peace ==
The second principle covered the special status of the ecclesiastical states, called the ecclesiastical reservation, or reservatum ecclesiasticum. If a prince-bishop or prince-abbot changed his religion, he would have to relinquish his rule, allowing the chapter to elect a Catholic successor.

The third principle, known as Ferdinand's declaration, exempted knights and some of the cities in ecclesiastical states from the requirement of religious uniformity, if the reformed religion had been practiced there since the mid-1520s, allowing for a few mixed cities and towns where Catholics and Lutherans had lived together. Ferdinand inserted this at the last minute, on his own authority.

== Legal ramifications ==
After 1555, the Peace of Augsburg became the legitimating legal document governing the coexistence of Catholic and Lutheran faiths in the German lands of the Holy Roman Empire, and it served to ameliorate many of the tensions between followers of the so-called Old Faith and the followers of Luther. It had two fundamental flaws. First, Ferdinand had rushed the article on ecclesiastical reservation through the debate; it had not undergone the scrutiny and discussion that attended the acceptance of Cuius regio, eius religio. Consequently, its wording did not cover all, or even most, potential legal scenarios. His ad hoc Declaratio Ferdinandei was not debated in plenary session at all; instead, using his authority to "act and settle", he had added it at the last minute, responding to lobbying by princely families and knights.

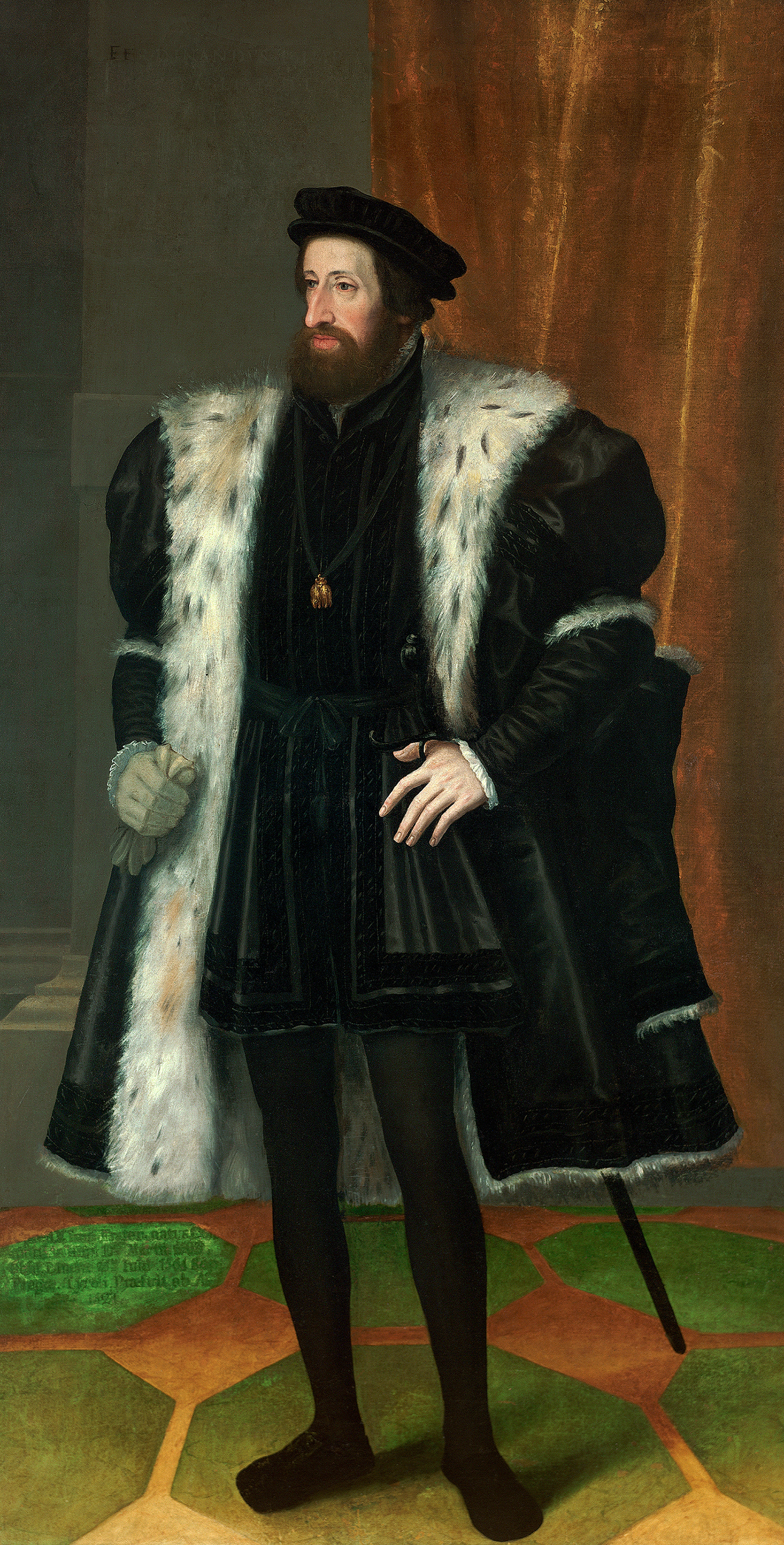
Ferdinand, King of the Romans after 1531 and Holy Roman Emperor (1555–1564). His brother instructed him to settle the disputes at the Augsburg Diet.

These specific failings came back to haunt the Empire in subsequent decades. Perhaps the greatest weakness of the Peace of Augsburg was its failure to take into account the growing diversity of religious expression emerging in the so-called evangelical and reformed traditions. By 1555, the reforms proposed by Luther were no longer the only possibilities of religious expression: Anabaptists, such as the Frisian Menno Simons (1492–1559) and his followers; the followers of John Calvin, who were particularly strong in the southwest and the northwest; or those of Huldrych Zwingli, were excluded from considerations and protections under the Peace of Augsburg. According to the Religious Peace, their religious beliefs were officially heretical, and would remain so in lands under the direct rule of the House of Habsburg until the Patent of Toleration in 1781.

== Application in secular territories ==
The idea of individual religious tolerance on a national level was, however, not addressed: neither the Reformed nor Radical churches (Calvinists and Anabaptists being the prime examples) were protected under the peace (and Anabaptists would reject the principle of cuius regio eius religio in any case). Crypto-Calvinists were accommodated by Philip Melanchthon, who supplied them with altered versions of the Augsburg Confession adapted to Reformed beliefs. One historical example is the case of Hessen-Kassel, where even though the Augsburg Confession was adopted in 1566, the territory was de facto Reformed even then, and continued as such until officially adopting a Reformed confession of faith in 1605.

Many Protestant groups living under the rule of Catholic or Lutheran noble still found themselves in danger of the charge of heresy. Tolerance was not officially extended to Calvinists until the Peace of Westphalia in 1648, and most Anabaptists eventually relocated east to Transylvania, the Polish–Lithuanian Commonwealth, the Ottoman Empire, or Russia, west to England and the New World or were martyred.

After the Peace of Westphalia in 1648 limited all rulers in the Holy Roman Empire except the Emperor to change their religion but not impose it on their subjects anymore, rulers choosing to convert had to tolerate the religions that were already in place. For example, Frederick Augustus I, Elector of Saxony converted to Catholicism in 1697 in order to become King of Poland, but the Electorate of Saxony had to remain officially Protestant. The Elector of Saxony even managed to retain the directorship of the Protestant body in the Reichstag.

John Sigismund, Elector of Brandenburg converted to Calvinism in 1613, but his subjects remained predominantly Lutheran. Brandenburg-Prussia remained a bi-confessional state in which both Lutheranism and Calvinism were official religions until the 1817 Prussian Union of Churches. The Electors of Brandenburg already tolerated Catholicism in Ducal Prussia, which lay outside the borders of the Holy Roman Empire and was held in fief to the King of Poland. They would later acquire other Catholic territories in Poland, but imposed taxes of up to 80% on church revenues. Brandenburg-Prussia also acquired territories in western Germany where Catholicism was the official religion. In 1747, Frederick the Great gave permission for a Catholic cathedral, St. Hedwig's Cathedral, to be built in the predominantly Lutheran capital city of Berlin.

== Application in ecclesiastical territories ==
No agreement had been reached on the question of whether Catholic bishops and abbots who became Lutheran should lose their offices and incomes until Peace of Augsburg under the reservatum ecclesiasticum clause. However prior to this in 1525, Albert, Duke of Prussia had converted to Lutheranism and expelled the Teutonic Knights. He was able to officially change his lands to the Lutheran faith and convert his ecclesiastical position as Grand Master of the Order into a secular duchy. When Archbishop-Elector of Cologne, Gebhard Truchsess von Waldburg converted to the Reformed faith, he thought he could do the same, despite the terms of the Peace of Augsburg. Catholics appointed Ernest of Bavaria to be the new archbishop-elector and fought the five-year war Cologne War. Gebhard Truchsess von Waldburg was exiled and Cologne remained Roman Catholic.

The Prince-Bishopric of Osnabrück was an exception to cuius regio, eius religio. Osnabrück gradually became more Lutheran after 1543, with the conversion or election of several Protestant bishops. However, it never became fully Lutheran, as Catholic services were still held and Catholic bishops were also elected. In the Peace of Westphalia, which was partially negotiated in Osnabrück, both the Catholic and Lutheran religions were restored to the status they held in Osnabrück in 1624. Osnabrück remained an ecclesiastical territory ruled by a prince-bishop, but the office would be held alternately by a Catholic bishop and a Lutheran bishop, who was selected from what became the House of Hanover. While the territory was ruled by a Lutheran bishop, the Catholics would be under the supervision of the Archbishop of Cologne.

In 1731, Prince-Archbishop von Firmian of Salzburg decided to recatholicize his territory. At first this included the seizing of Protestant children from their parents so they could be raised in a Catholic institution. The Prince-Archbishop requested Imperial and Bavarian troops to aid in the suppression of approximately 20,000 Lutherans living in Salzburg. When the Archbishop claimed they were radicals, they were examined and determined to be Lutherans of the ordinary sort. He expelled them anyway, which was technically legal under the 1648 Peace of Westphalia.

In February 1732, King Frederick William I of Prussia offered to resettle them in eastern Prussia. Others found their way to Hanover or the Dutch Republic. Additionally, a community of Salzburgers settled in the British colony of Georgia.

In 1966, Archbishop Andreas Rohracher expressed regret about the expulsions.

== See also ==
- Phyletism
- Res publica Christiana, the medieval and Renaissance concept of a united Christendom
