= Elizabethan England (Tenison) =

1933–1960 book by E.M.Tenison

- Author: Eva Tenison
- Publication date: 1932/3 start

Eva Tenison's research was published in 13 volumes from 1933 to 1960 with the title Elizabethan England: Being the History of this Country "in Relation to All Foreign Princes". She was secretive about her identity and gender. These books were labelled "by E.M.Tenison". One set of the resulting 14 volumes is in the Royal Collection. The British Library's catalogue record shows the extended subtitle: "From original manuscripts, many hitherto unpublished; co-ordinated with XVIth century printed matter ranging from royal proclamations to broadside ballads. A survey of life and literature ... with many hundred portraits and other illustrations in collotype, also title pages and portraits in line, etc."

== Development ==
Tenison had been writing novels and studies under a number of different names. In the 1920s she began thirty years of research and writing about the Elizabethan period of history. She conducted original research using primary sources and she would gather together maps and illustrations to accompany her text. The books were published privately and first was published in 1933 with the title Elizabethan England, being the History of this Country "in Relation to all Foreign Princes".

The book was written by "E.M.Tenison" as Tenison was protective of her gender and identity. A 1941 review of volume VII of her work, about the years 1587–8, in the academic journal The Mariner's Mirror, referred to her as male. This failure to identify her as female was despite the fact that Tenison also contributed to that journal but she used the name of "Nauticus".

Her work was based on original research using unpublished papers in England and Spain. The books were not initially well received as they failed to give due weight to the prevailing theories of historians. However, it has been accepted that many of her insights are convincing.

== Royal gift ==
A subscription to Tenison's books of Elizabethan England was made to King George V and Queen Mary in May 1935. The subscription was a gift by the Mayors and Council Chairmen of Northampton to commemorate the King's silver jubilee. The resulting collection of volumes was covered in navy goatskin and they carry King George V Royal Arms and cypher. They are kept in Windsor Castle's Royal Library and has been identified by Olwen Hedley as an addition to the Royal catalogue of books with exceptional bindings.
