= Gwenllian Morgan =

Welsh antiquarian, writer and Mayor (1852–1939)

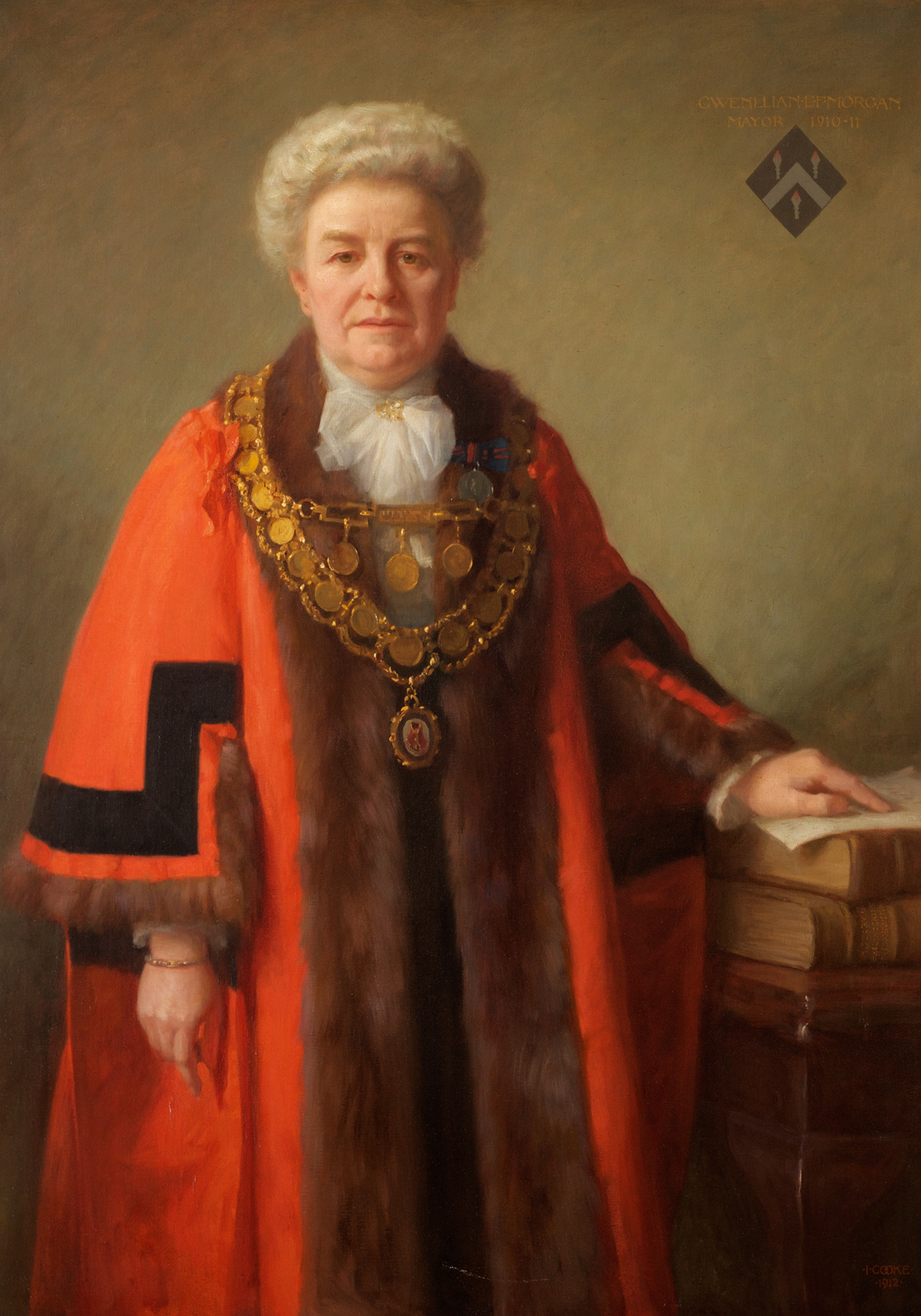
Miss Gwenllian E. F. Morgan, Coronation Mayor of Brecon (1912) by Isaac Cooke (1846–1922)

Gwenllian Elizabeth Fanny Morgan (9 April 1852 – 7 November 1939), was the first woman in Wales to hold the office of Mayor. She was also an antiquary and published books about her area of study. Morgan served as superintendent of Petitions and Treaties, World's Woman's Christian Temperance Union (W. C. T. U.); was a member of the Executive Committee of the National British Women's Temperance Association; and was the president of the Brecon Branch. She was a white ribbon worker for eleven years and took a deep interest in the work. Morgan organized the Polyglot Petition work in Great Britain and Ireland and filled the position of British Secretary for the World's W. C. T. U. Apart from this, she was in full sympathy with, and was long connected with active work for women generally, of political and suffrage lines.

Towards the end of her life, Morgan and Louise Imogen Guiney collaborated in writing historical notes about the works of Henry Vaughan. Their work was published posthumously in 1947.

== Early years ==
Gwenllian Elizabeth Fanny Morgan was born in Defynnog on 9 April 1852. She was the daughter of Philip Morgan, curate at Penpont and rector in Llanhamlach. After his death in 1868, she moved to Brecon.

== Career ==
Morgan was very prominent in public life in her town and its area, especially with regard to education. She became the first woman in Wales to be elected to a municipal council, in 1907, and the first woman in Wales to be a mayor, from 1910 to 1911 in Brecon, electing her sister Nellie as mayoress. In 1912, over 900 women raised the money for the Liverpool artist Isaac Cooke to paint a full portrait of her. The painting recorded that she was the first woman mayor and that she was the "Coronation Mayor", in reference to the Coronation of George V and Queen Mary. The portrait is now in the collection of Brecon Town Council and hangs in the Guildhall there.

Morgan was interested in literature and contributed articles to Old Wales. A monthly magazine of antiquities for Wales and the Borders, edited by W. R. Williams of Talybont-on-Usk. Morgan was an admirer of the work of the metaphysical poet Henry Vaughan, who had lived near Brecon. She collaborated with Louise Imogen Guiney on a volume of Vaughan's work, with biographical sketch and historical notes, but these two died before finishing the job and it was taken over by Dr. F. E. Hutchinson. Hutchinson published a comprehensive book about Vaughan based on their work in 1947.

Morgan's work in the international temperance movement was highly praised. She had become involved due to her friendship with Lady Constance Battersea as Lucy Cohen in Lady de Rothschild and her Daughters, writes, 'Miss Morgan, now over eighty, wrote to me that she owed everything to Lady Battersea, who had opened her mind to the larger interests of life outside her little town, had given her books to read, helped her in her studies, and brought her into contact with politicians and literary men.'

Morgan was granted an honorary MA degree by the University of Wales in 1925. She died on 7 November 1939 in Brecon.

== Legacy ==
The "Shining a light on Gwenllian Morgan" project has, as of March 2025, three goals:

1. Commissioning a sculpture of Morgan and a video of her life
2. Researching the women who funded her oil portrait
3. Creating educational materials about Morgan
