= Peace of Augsburg =

1555 treaty between the Holy Roman Emperor and the Schmalkaldic League

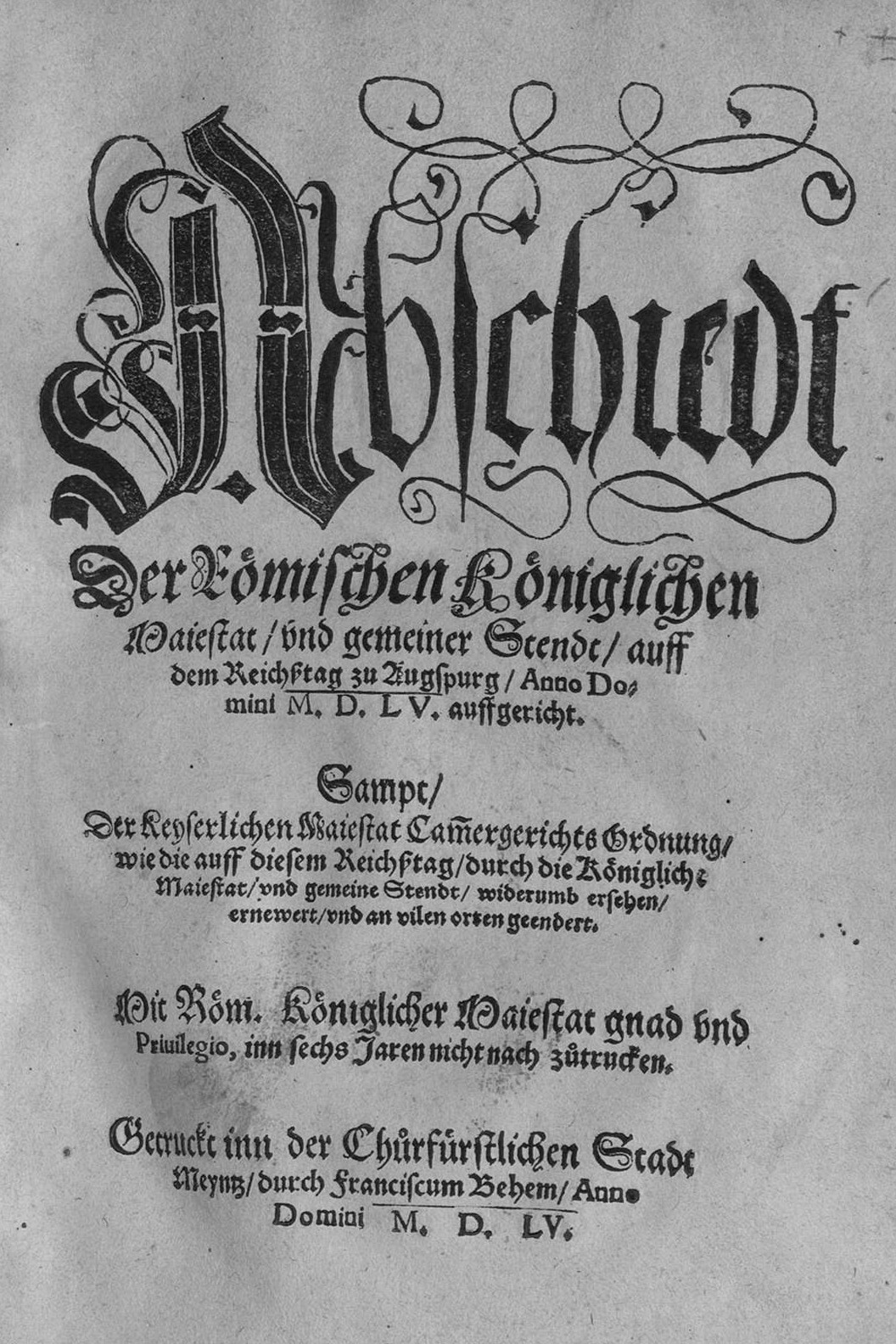
- The front page of the document. Mainz, 1555.
- Date: 1555
- Location: Augsburg
- Participants: Charles V, Schmalkaldic League
- Outcome: (1) Established the principle Cuius regio, eius religio. (2) Established the principle of reservatum ecclesiasticum. (3) Laid the legal groundwork for two co-existing religious confessions (Catholicism and Lutheranism) in the German-speaking states of the Holy Roman Empire.

The Peace of Augsburg (German: Augsburger Frieden), also called the Augsburg Settlement, was a treaty between Charles V, Holy Roman Emperor and the Schmalkaldic League, signed on 25 September 1555 in the German city of Augsburg. It officially ended the religious struggle between the two groups and made the legal division of Christianity permanent within the Holy Roman Empire, allowing rulers to choose either Lutheranism or Roman Catholicism as the official confession of their state. Calvinism was not allowed until the Peace of Westphalia.

The Peace of Augsburg has been described as "the first step on the road toward a European system of sovereign states." The system, created based on the Augsburg Peace, collapsed at the beginning of the 17th century, which was one of the reasons for the Thirty Years' War.

== Overview ==
The Peace elaborated the principle Cuius regio, eius religio ("whose realm, his religion"), which allowed the princes of states within the Holy Roman Empire to adopt either Lutheranism or Catholicism within the domains they controlled, ultimately reaffirming their sovereignty over those domains. Subjects, citizens, or residents were generally forced to convert to their prince's religion, through a principle called ius reformandi. Those who did not wish to conform to the prince's choice were given a grace period in which they were free to emigrate to different regions in which their desired religion had been accepted. This principle is known as ius emigrandi. However, serfs were essentially excluded from this right to emigrate.

Article 24 stated: "In case our subjects, whether belonging to the Augsburg Confession, should intend leaving their homes with their wives and children to settle in another, they shall be hindered neither in the sale of their estates after due payment of the local taxes nor injured in their honor."

Charles V had made an interim ruling, the Augsburg Interim of 1548, on the legitimacy of two religious creeds in the empire, and this was codified in law on 30 June 1548 upon the insistence of the emperor, who wanted to work out religious differences under the auspices of a general council of the Catholic Church. The Interim largely reflected principles of Catholic religious behavior in its 26 articles, although it allowed for the marriage of the clergy and the giving of both bread and wine to the laity. This led to resistance by the Protestant territories, who proclaimed their own Interim at Leipzig the following year.

The Interim was overthrown in 1552 by the revolt of the Protestant elector Maurice of Saxony and his allies. In the negotiations at Passau in the summer of 1552, even the Catholic princes had called for a lasting peace, fearing that the religious controversy would never be settled. The emperor, however, was unwilling to recognize the religious division in Western Christendom as permanent. This document was foreshadowed by the Peace of Passau, which in 1552 gave Lutherans religious freedom after a victory by Protestant armies. Under the Passau document, Charles granted a peace only until the next imperial Diet, whose meeting was called in early 1555.

The treaty, negotiated on Charles' behalf by his brother, Ferdinand, gave Lutheranism official status within the domains of the Holy Roman Empire, according to the policy of cuius regio, eius religio. Knights and towns who had practiced Lutheranism for some time were exempted under the Declaratio Ferdinandei. Conversely, the Ecclesiastical reservation prevented the principle of cuius regio, eius religio from being applied if an ecclesiastical ruler converted to Lutheranism.

In practice, the principle of cuius regio had already been implemented between the time of the Nuremberg Religious Peace of 1532 and the 1546–1547 Schmalkaldic War. Now legal in the de jure sense, it was to apply to all the territories of the Empire except for the Ecclesiastical principalities and some of the cities in those ecclesiastical states, where the question of religion was addressed under the separate principles of the reservatum ecclesiasticum and the Declaratio Ferdinandei, which also formed part of the Peace of Augsburg. This agreement marked the end of the first wave of organized military action between Protestants and Catholics; however, these principles were factors during the wars of the 1545–1648 Counter-Reformation.

This left out Reformed Zwinglians and Anabaptists, but not Calvinists who approved of the Augsburg Confession Variata. Practices other than the two which were the most widespread in the Empire were expressly forbidden, considered by the law to be heretical, and could be punishable by death. Although "cuius regio" did not explicitly intend to allow the modern ideal of "freedom of conscience", individuals who could not subscribe to their ruler's religion were permitted to leave his territory with their possessions. Also under the Declaratio Ferdinandei, Lutheran knights were given the freedom to retain their religion wherever they lived. The revocation of the Declaratio Ferdinandei by the Catholics in the 1629 Edict of Restitution helped fuel the Thirty Years' War of 1618–1648. The Edict of Restitution itself was overturned in the 1635 Peace of Prague. The following Peace of Westphalia prohibited rulers from force-converting their subjects, overturning the Augsburg principle of ius reformandi, and determining the official religion of Imperial territories to the status of 1624 as a normative year. It also allowed for serfs to emigrate, something that the Peace of Augsburg had not confirmed.

Although some dissenters emigrated, others lived as Nicodemites. Because of geographical and linguistic circumstances on the continent of Europe, emigration was more feasible for Catholics living in Protestant lands than for Protestants living in Catholic lands. As a result, there were more crypto-Protestants than crypto-Papists in continental Europe.

== Main principles ==
The Peace of Augsburg contained three main principles:

1. The principle of cuius regio, eius religio ("Whose realm, his religion") established the idea of internal religious unity within a state. According to this principle, the religion practiced by the prince—either Lutheranism or Roman Catholicism—would be adopted as the official religion of the state and its inhabitants. Those who could not conform to the prince's religion were permitted to leave, which was an innovative concept in the 16th century. Delegates discussed this principle in detail and ultimately agreed on the specific wording after thoroughly examining the issue from various perspectives. Furthermore, forms of Christianity other than the two mentioned, particularly the emerging faith of Calvinism, were not recognized by the Empire.
2. The second principle, called the reservatum ecclesiasticum (ecclesiastical reservation), covered the special status of the ecclesiastical state. If the prelate of an ecclesiastic state changed his religion, the inhabitants of that state did not have to do so. Instead, the prelate was expected to resign from his post, although this was not spelled out in the agreement.
3. The third principle, known as Declaratio Ferdinandei (Ferdinand's Declaration), exempted knights and some of the cities from the requirement of religious uniformity, if the reformed religion had been practiced there since the mid-1520s. This allowed for a few mixed cities and towns where Catholics and Lutherans had lived together. It also protected the authority of the princely families, the knights, and some of the cities to determine what religious uniformity meant in their territories. Ferdinand inserted this at the last minute, on his own authority.

The third principle was not publicized as part of the treaty, and was kept secret for almost two decades.

== Problems ==
The document left some unresolved problems. While it gave legal basis for the practice of the Lutheran confession, it did not include Zwinglianism nor Anabaptism. Although the Peace of Augsburg was moderately successful in relieving tension in the empire and increasing tolerance, it meant that many Protestant groups living in the empire still found themselves in danger of the charge of heresy. (Article 17: "However, all such as do not belong to the two above named religions shall not be included in the present peace but be totally excluded from it.") These minorities did not achieve any legal recognition until the Peace of Westphalia in 1648.

Failure to secure a broader peace ultimately led to the Thirty Years' War. One precursor was the Third Defenestration of Prague (1618) in which two representatives of the fiercely Catholic king of Bohemia, Ferdinand II, were thrown out of a castle window.

== Aftermath ==
The principle of ecclesiastical reservation was tested in the Cologne War (1583–1588), which grew out of the scenario envisioned by Ferdinand when he wrote the proviso: the reigning prince-archbishop, Gebhard Truchsess von Waldburg, converted to Protestantism; although he did not insist that the population convert, he placed Calvinism on a parity with Catholicism throughout the Electorate of Cologne. This in itself came forth as a two-fold legal problem: first, Calvinism was considered a heresy; second, the elector did not resign his see, which made him eligible in theory to cast a ballot for emperor. Finally, his marriage raised the possibility of converting the electorate into a dynastic principality, shifting the balance of religious power in the empire, as Protestants could potentially hold a majority of electorates.

A side effect of the religious turmoil was Charles' decision to abdicate and divide Habsburg territory into two sections. His brother Ferdinand ruled the Austrian lands, and Charles' fervently Catholic son, Philip II, became administrator of Spain, the Spanish Netherlands, parts of Italy, and other overseas holdings.

== Bibliography ==
- Holborn, Hajo. A History of Modern Germany, The Reformation. Princeton: Princeton University Press, 1959 [1982], ISBN 9780691007953.
- Whaley, Joachim (2012). Germany and the Holy Roman Empire, Volume I: Maximilian I to the Peace of Westphalia, 1493–1648. Vol. I. Oxford: OUP. ISBN 978-0-19-873101-6.
