= Louise Imogen Guiney =

American poet (1861–1920)

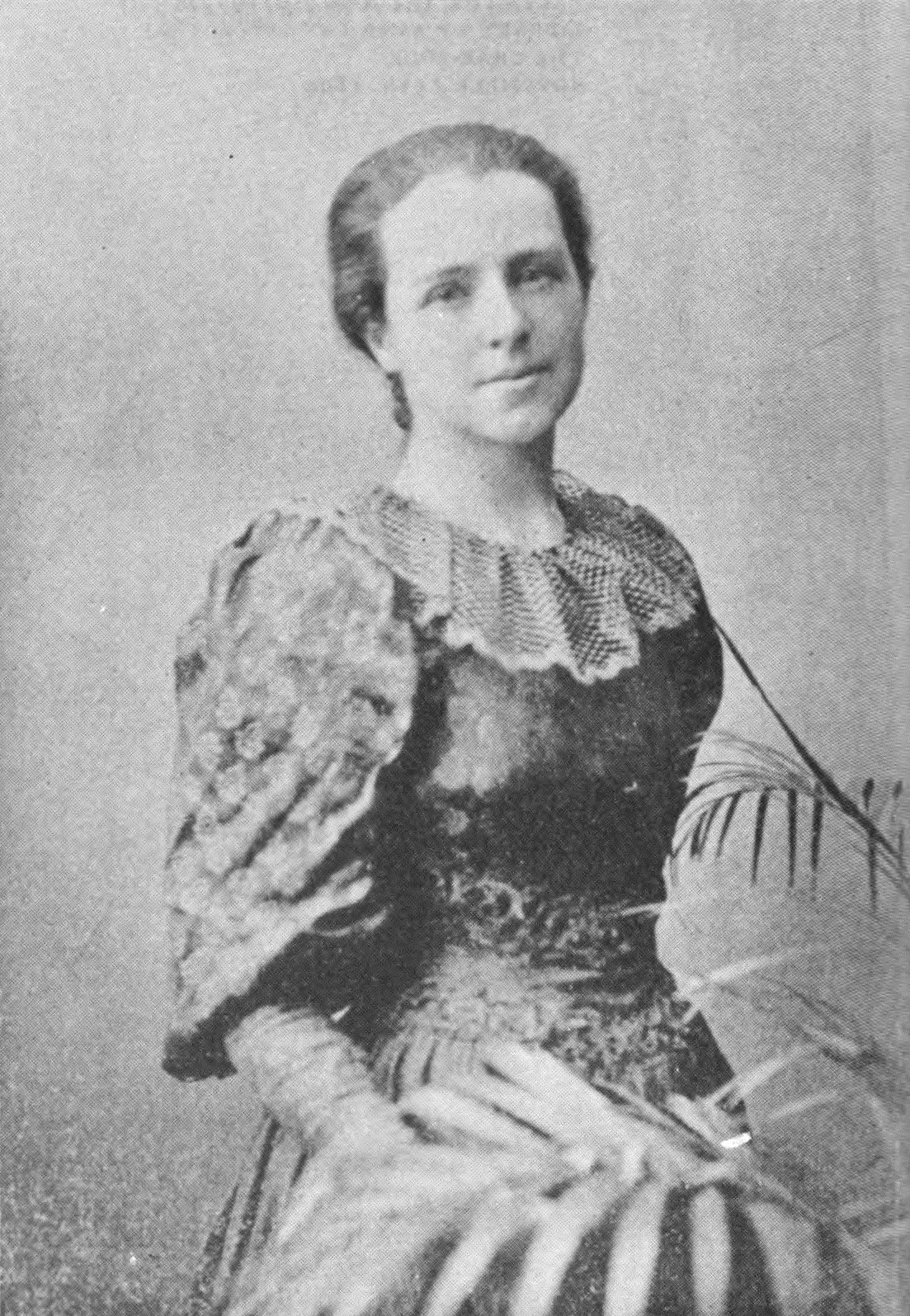
- Photograph of Guiney (c. 1894)
- Born: January 7, 1861 Roxbury, Massachusetts
- Died: November 2, 1920 (aged 59) Gloucestershire, England
- Relatives: Patrick Robert Guiney (father)

Signature
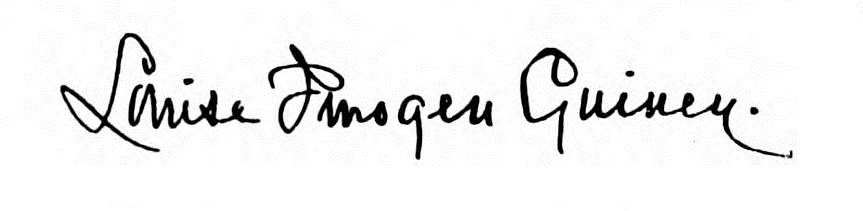

Louise Imogen Guiney (January 7, 1861 – November 2, 1920) was an American poet, essayist and editor, born in Roxbury, Massachusetts.

== Biography ==
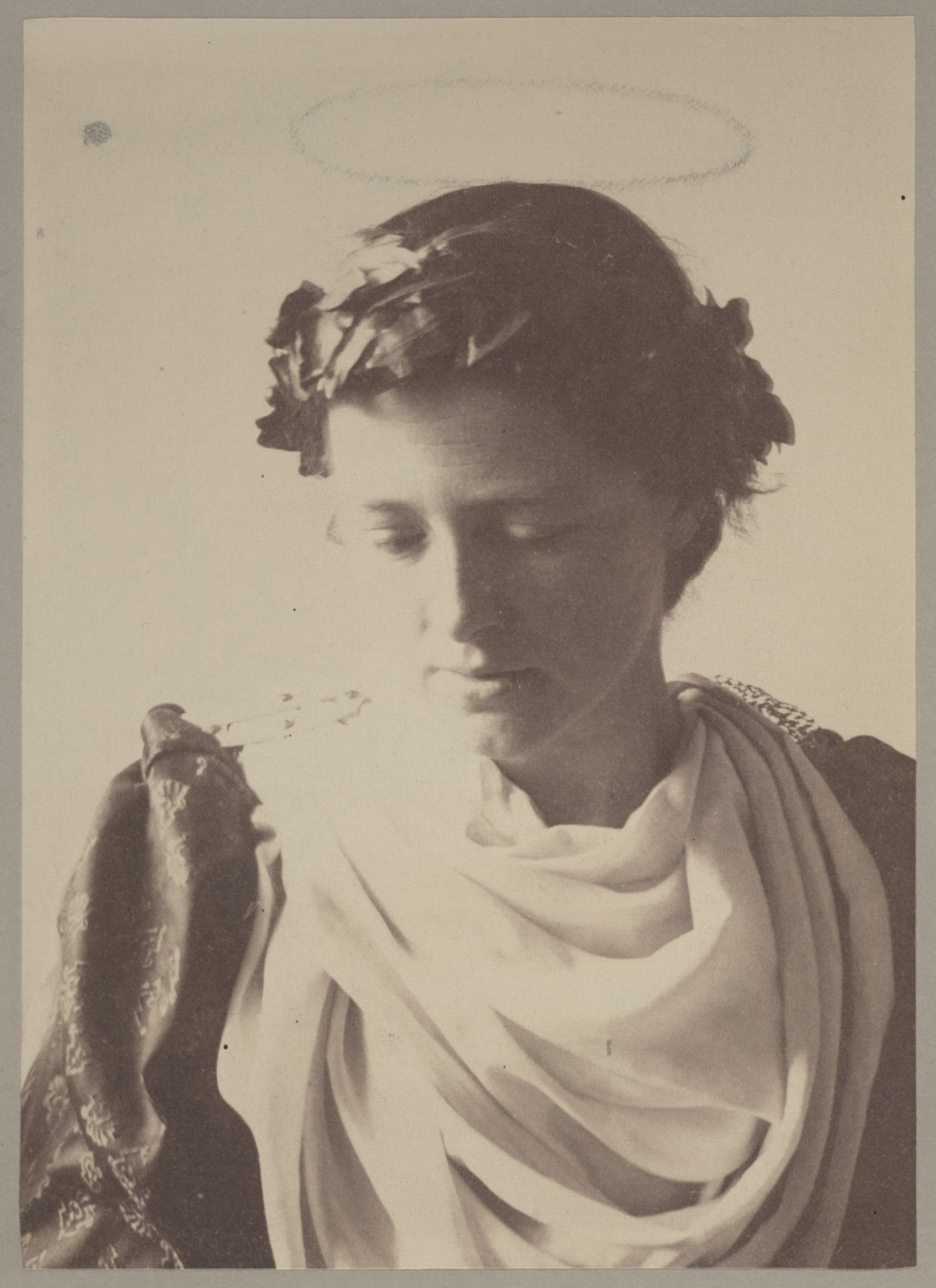
Photograph of Guiney (1893)

The daughter of Gen. Patrick R. Guiney, an Irish-born American Civil War officer and lawyer, from County Tipperary and Jeannette Margaret Doyle, she was raised Roman Catholic and educated at the Notre Dame convent school in Boston and at the Academy of the Sacred Heart in Providence, Rhode Island, from which she graduated in 1879.

Over the next 20 years, she worked at various jobs, including serving as a postmistress and working in the field of cataloging at the Boston Public Library. She was a member of several literary and social clubs, and according to her friend Ralph Adams Cram was "the most vital and creative personal influence" on their circle of writers and artists in Boston (see Visionists).

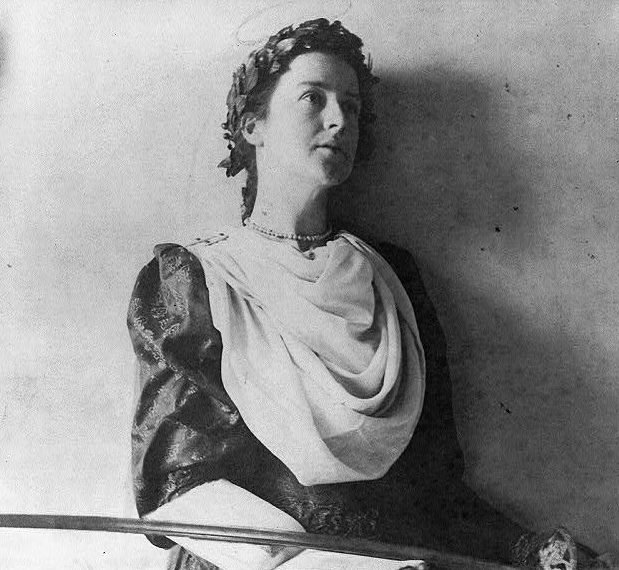
Photograph of Guiney by Fred Holland Day (1893).

In 1901, Guiney moved to Oxford, England, to focus on her poetry and essay writing. She donated a crucifix sculpture to the church of St Mary and St Nicholas, Littlemore, to mark the centenary of Cardinal Newman's birth in 1901.

She soon began to suffer from illness and was no longer able to write poetry. She was a contributor to The Atlantic Monthly, Scribner's Magazine, McClure's, Blackwood's Magazine, Dublin Review, The Catholic World, and the Catholic Encyclopedia.

Guiney is believed to have had a long-term relationship with Alice Brown who wrote of their travels together in her book By Oak and Thorn (1897) and later wrote the biography Louise Imogen Guiney — a Study (1921).

With Gwenllian Morgan, Guiney prepared materials for an edition and biography of the seventeenth-century Anglo-Welsh Metaphysical poet Henry Vaughan. Neither Guiney nor Morgan lived to complete the project, however, but their research was used by F. E. Hutchinson for his 1947 biography Henry Vaughan.

== Death and legacy ==
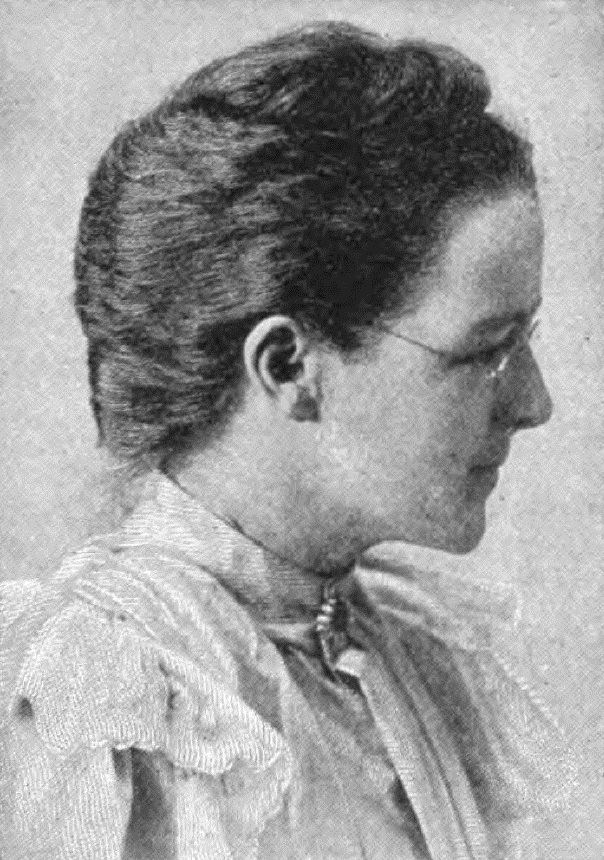
Photograph of Guiney (c. 1900)

Guiney died of a stroke near Gloucestershire, England, at age 59, leaving much of her work unfinished. Her life and works caught the attention of the historian and writer Eva Tenison who unusually published books about her under her own name. In the year after she died Tenison published, Louise Imogen Guiney; an Appreciation. In 1923 she published Louise Imogen Guiney: Her Life and Works, 1861-1920 and A Bibliography of Louise Imogen Guiney, 1861-1920. Tenison also published, The Recusant Poets: An Unpublished Work of Louise Imogen Guiney and Fr. Geoffrey Bliss, S.J.

In 1926, Guiney's sister Grace published a posthumous letter collection.

- Songs at the Start (1884, poetry)
- Goose-Quill Papers (1885, essays)
- The White Sail and Other Poems (1887, poetry)
- Brownies and Bogles (1888, poetry)
- Monsieur Henri: A Foot-Note to French History (1892, essays)
- A Roadside Harp (1893, poetry)
- A Little English Gallery (1895, essays)
- Robert Louis Stevenson (1895, biography, with Alice Brown)
- Lovers' Saint Ruth's and Three Other Tales (1895, short stories)
- Nine Sonnets Written at Oxford (1895, poetry)
- Patrins (1897, essays)
- James Clarence Mangan, his Selected Poems: With a Study by the Editor (1897, editor)
- England and Yesterday (1898, poetry)
- The Martyrs' Idyl and Shorter Poems (1899, poetry)
- Robert Emmet (1904)
- Hurrell Froude. Memoranda and Comments (1904)
- The Princess of the Tower (1906, poetry)
- Blessed Edmund Campion (1908)
- Happy Ending (1909, poetry, her collected verse)
- Letters (1926, letters) (posthumously)
- Recusant Poets (1939, ed., with Geoffrey Bliss) (posthumously)

== Sources ==
- Fairbanks, Henry G., Louise Imogen Guiney, New York: Twayne Publishers Inc., 1975. ISBN 978-0805703429.
- Reichardt, Mary R. (ed.), Catholic Women Writers: A Bio-bibliographical Sourcebook, Portsmouth, NH: Greenwood Publishing Group, Inc., 2001. ISBN 978-0313311475.
- Tenison, E.M., Louise Imogen Guiney,: Her Life And Works, 1861-1920, London: Macmillan, London, 1923. ASIN: B000859GVG 1923.
