= Eva Tenison =

British historian and novelist (1880–1961)

- Born: 31 May 1880; Liverpool
- Died: August 1961 (aged 81); Hedingham Castle
- Other names: Michael Barrington; E.M.Tenison; Nauticus; Historicus'
- Occupation: historian
- Known for: 14 volumes of Elizabethan England

Eva Mabel Tenison writing as Michael Barrington, E.M.Tenison, Nauticus and Historicus (31 May 1880 – August 1961) was a British historian and novelist. Her magnum opus was the fourteen volume Elizabethan England: Being the History of this Country "In Relation to All Foreign Princes" but she published novels, biographies and other studies of history.

== Life ==
Tenison was born in Liverpool in 1880. She was the first of three children born to Elizabeth Isabel (born Ashlin) and Charles McCarthy Tenison. Her father was a barrister working in the banking area and her uncle, Alfred Tenison Collins, led the Hibernian Bank. For the first ten years of her life her and the family's name was Collins. In 1890 her father successfully gained approval to use the name and arms of Archbishop Tenison. She travelled to Australia and Tasmania and she gained her education privately. She first came to notice when she published under the nom de plume of Michael Barrington her debut novel, The King's fool, a romance. By the time her second novel was published in 1909 the Irish Monthly was saying "Mr. Barrington has already established his reputation by The Reminiscences of Sir Barrington Beaumont, and still more...". The second novel was The Knight of the Golden Sword.

Tenison was protective of her identity. Her historical novels were published under the name of Michael Barrington and she also wrote under the name of Nauticus for the Mariner's Mirror. She also used the name of Historicus and "E.M.Tenison".

The American poet Louise Imogen Guiney died of a stroke near Gloucestershire, England, at age 59, leaving much of her work unfinished. In the year after Guiney died Tenison published, Louise Imogen Guiney; an Appreciation. In 1923 she published, Louise Imogen Guiney: Her Life and Works, 1861–1920 and A Bibliography of Louise Imogen Guiney, 1861-1920. Tenison also published, The Recusant Poets: An Unpublished Work of Louise Imogen Guiney and Fr. Geoffrey Bliss, S.J.

In 1914 she published "Chivalry and the Wounded" that looked at the 900 years history of The Hospitallers of St. John of Jerusalem.

In the 1920s she began thirty years of research and writing about the Elizabethan period of history. She conducted original research using primary sources and she would gather together maps and illustrations to accompany her text. The books were published privately and the first was published in 1933 with the title Elizabethan England, being the History of this Country "In Relation to all Foreign Princes". Her work was based on original research using unpublished papers in England and Spain. The books were not initially well received as they failed to give due wight to the prevailing theories of historians. However it has been accepted that many of her insights are convincing.

== Death and legacy ==
Tenison died in Hedingham Castle. Tenison's papers are held at Kent University. A presentation set of her Elizabethan England is held in the Royal Library at Windsor Castle.
