= Augsburg Confession Variata =

Revised confession of faith of the Lutheran Church

The Altered Augsburg Confession (Lat. Confessio Augustana Variata) is a later version of the Lutheran Augsburg Confession that includes notable differences with regard to holy communion and the presence of Christ in bread and wine. It is distinguished from the unaltered or Editio princeps (original edition).

Philipp Melanchthon made several changes to the original edition of the Augsburg Confession in the years following its 1530 publication. Most of the changes were about the language of the confession. In 1540 and 1542, he rewrote some parts of the confession in order to reconcile it with the views of Calvinists.

== Alterations ==
Articles 2, 4, 5, 20 and 21 of Part 1 are enlarged in the Variata. Various other sentences are altered, and the order of the articles in part 2 are rearranged.

The most discussed difference between the Variata and the Editio princeps is in the theology of Real Presence, article 10.

Comparison of Article 10
Invariata (1530)	Variata (1540)
De Cœna Domini docent, quod corpus et sanguis Christi vere adsint, et distribuantur vescentibus in Cœna Domini; et improbant secus docentes.	De Coena Domini docent, quod cum pane et vino vere exhibeantur corpus et sanguis Christi, vescentibus in Coena Domini.
Touching the Supper of the Lord they teach, that the body and blood of Christ are there present indeed, and are distributed to those that eat of the Lord's; Supper; and they condemn those that teach other- wise.	Touching the Supper of the Lord they teach, that, together with the bread and wine, the body and blood of Christ are truly exhibited to them that eat of the Lord's Supper.

== Reception ==
Martin Luther did not object to the variata, nor did other Lutherans at the time of its printing. Objection first came from opposing Roman Catholics at the Colloquy of Worms. Melancthon testified that there were no changes of "matter, substance and meaning."

Reformed theologians also signed the Augsburg Confession, presumably the Variata. John Calvin at Strasbourg and again at the 1541 Conference of Ratisbon, William Farel and Theodore Beza at the 1557 Colloquy of Worms, and Frederick III at the 1561 convent of Princes in Naumburg, among others. The Variata enabled Calvinist domains security in the 1555 Peace of Augsburg.

United churches in the 19th and 20th centuries preferred the Variata.

Lutheran churches often specify that they agree to the Unaltered Augsburg Confession as opposed to the altered version.
