= Reservatum ecclesiasticum =

System attempting to create Protestant-Catholic peace

Peace of Augsburg
- Date: 1555
- Location: Augsburg
- Participants: Ferdinand, King of the Romans acting for Charles V. Delegates from the Imperial Estates
- Outcome: (1) The principle of cuius regio, eius religio established religious conformity within a single state. Two confessions of faith were acceptable: Catholicism or the Augsburg Confession (Lutheranism). Any other expression of faith was heretical. (2) The principle of reservatum ecclesiasticum protected religious conformity within the ecclesiastical estates, but it did not clearly state how this was to be protected. (3) The declaratio Ferdinandei granted certain exemptions to the principle of cuius regio, eius religio to some knights, sovereign families, and imperial cities.

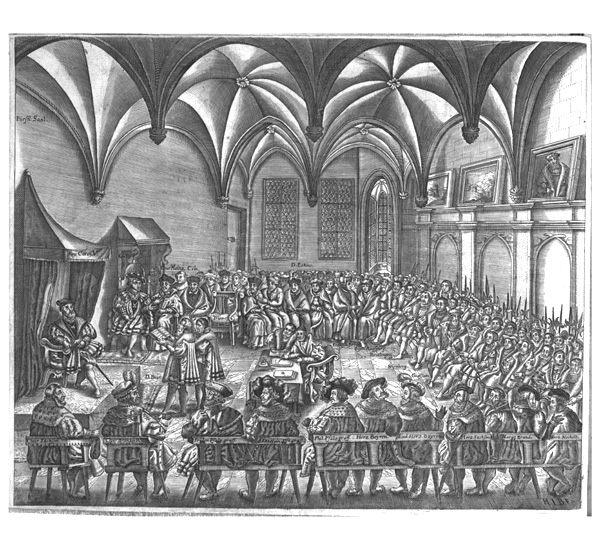
Representatives of the German estates at the Augsburg conference discuss the possibilities of a religious peace.

The reservatum ecclesiasticum (Latin, "ecclesiastical reservation"; German: Geistlicher Vorbehalt) was a provision of the Peace of Augsburg of 1555. It exempted ecclesiastical lands from the principle of cuius regio, eius religio (Latin: whose land, his religion), which the Peace established for all hereditary dynastic lands, such as those ruled by princes or dukes. Under this principle, the religion of the ruler would be the religion of the country and of its people, those being his possession by inheritance.

But this same principle would have different consequences if applied in an ecclesiastical realm, such as one ruled by a prince-bishop or an abbot. Such a realm was structurally Catholic, and its ruler was elected or appointed within the Church, having no hereditary rights.

The reservatum ecclesiasticum declared that an ecclesiastical prince who converted to Lutheranism immediately forfeited his authority (which he had received within the Church) and the realm was not converted. His office became vacant and he would be replaced by a Catholic. The measure was inserted into the Peace by Imperial authority, as it was not supported by Protestants. Nonetheless, the Protestants chose not to veto the measure and in return gained the declaratio Ferdinandei that protected Protestant knights and long-established Protestant cities and communities, including those in territories where reservatum ecclesiasticum applied.

The measure was contested in 1583, when the Archbishop-Elector of Cologne, Gebhard Truchsess von Waldburg, converted to Protestantism, specifically to Calvinism, and tried to retain his office. In the resulting Cologne War, Gebhard was supported by the Dutch Republic and the Electorate of the Palatinate. But the war was eventually won by his Catholic replacement, Ernest of Bavaria, supported by his brother William V, Duke of Bavaria, and by Philip II of Spain. The Spanish army, commanded by the Duke of Parma, physically recovered the electoral territory. Ernest's victory upheld the principle of the reservatum ecclesiasticum.

The measure continued to be a source of grievance for Protestants. After the ascension of the emperor Matthias, his new chancellor Melchior Klesl hoped to dissolve the religious alliances of the time — the Protestant Union and the Catholic League — and bring people of all faiths back under the authority of the Emperor. In response, the Protestant Union's Assembly at Rothenburg ob der Tauber voted in March 1613 to not disband while the Catholic League was still in existence, and to ensure certain long-standing grievances were rectified, including the reservatum ecclesiasticum.

== See also ==
- Peace of Augsburg
