= 1560s =

Decade

The 1560s decade ran from January 1, 1560, to December 31, 1569.

== Events ==
=== 1560 ===
==== January–March ====
- January 7 – In the Kingdom of Scotland, French troops commanded by Henri Cleutin and Captain Corbeyran de Cardaillac Sarlabous sail across the Firth of Forth from Leith, which they are occupying, and fight with the Lords of the Congregation at Pettycur Bay near Kinghorn.
- February 27 – Treaty of Berwick: Terms are agreed upon with the Lords of the Congregation in Scotland, for forces of the Kingdom of England to enter Scotland, to expel French troops defending the Regency of Mary of Guise.
- March 7 – A Spanish-led expedition, commanded by Juan de la Cerda, 4th Duke of Medinaceli, overruns the Tunisian island of Djerba.
- March 17 – Leaders of the Amboise conspiracy, including Godefroy de Barry, seigneur de La Renaudie, make an unsuccessful attempt to storm the château of Amboise, where the young French king and queen are residing. La Renaudie is subsequently caught and executed, along with over 1,000 of his followers.
- March – Bairam Khan, the Vakil or prime minister of India's Mughal Empire, is forced to retire by the Emperor Akbar.

==== April–June ====
- April 15 – Denmark–Norway buys the Estonian island of Ösel, from its last prince-bishop.
- May 11 – In the Battle of Djerba, the Ottoman fleet, commanded by Piali Pasha, overwhelms a large joint European (mainly Spanish) fleet, sinking about half its ships.
- June 12 (19th day of 5th month of Eiroku 3) – In Japan, Oda Nobunaga defeats Imagawa Yoshimoto in the Battle of Okehazama.

==== July–September ====
- July 6 – The Treaty of Edinburgh is signed between England, France and Scotland, ending the Siege of Leith. The French withdraw from Scotland, largely ending the Auld Alliance between the two countries, and also ending the wars between England and its northern neighbour.
- August 2 – Livonian War – Battle of Ergeme: Russians defeat the Livonian Brothers of the Sword, precipitating the dissolution of the order.
- August 17 – The Scottish Reformation Parliament adopts a Protestant confession of faith and rejects papal authority, beginning the Scottish Reformation, and disestablishing Roman Catholicism in Scotland.
- August 21 – A total eclipse of the sun is observable in Europe, which inspires Tycho Brahe's interest in astronomy.
- September 18 – After Robert Sempill, 3rd Lord Sempill, a Scottish Catholic, continues to resist the Scottish Reformation, the Duke of Châtellerault and the Earl of Arran commence a siege of Castle Semple at Lochwinnoch. They begin firing artillery at the castle on September 23 and destroy the gatehouse.
- September 29 – Eric XIV becomes King of Sweden, upon the death of his father, Gustav Vasa.

==== October–December ====
- October 4 – Queen Elizabeth of England notifies the official treasurers and Lords Mayor throughout the kingdom that the existing coins will be replaced and that those in circulation are to be devalued, to be stricken with a special mark to indicate lesser worth. Treasurers are all instructed to send the coins withdrawn from circulation to be sent to the Royal Mint to be melted down for the new coins.
- October 19 – The siege of Castle Semple ends after 31 days when the defenders wave the white flag of surrender.
- October 29 – Queen Elizabeth directs the minting of the first machine produced coins in the Kingdom to completely replace hammered coinage, produced manually.
- November 8 – Eloy Mestrelle is given authority to commence the production of the new English coinage on machines he has brought over from France for the purpose of mass production.
- December 5 – Charles IX succeeds his brother Francis as King of France, after Francis dies of a severe ear infection at the age of 16. Francis's mother (Mary's mother-in-law), Catherine de' Medici, becomes regent of France.

==== Date unknown ====
- The complete Geneva Bible is published.
- The first scientific society, the Academia Secretorum Naturae, is founded in Naples by Giambattista della Porta.
- Solihull School is founded in the West Midlands of England.
- The oldest surviving violin (dated inside), known as the Charles IX, is made in Cremona, in northern Italy.
- The Mongols invade and occupy Qinghai.
- The great age of piracy in the Caribbean starts around this time.

=== 1561 ===
==== January–March ====
- January 4 – Paolo Battista Giudice Calvi is elected as the new Doge of the Republic of Genoa, but serves for only eight months before dying in September.
- January 31
  - The Ordinance of Orléans suspends the persecution of the Protestant Huguenots in Kingdom of France.
  - Mughal Empire General Bairam Khan is assassinated by an Afghan warrior, Mubarak Khan Lohani, while traveling through Gujarat in India.
- February 13 – Queen Elizabeth of England summons the Ambassador from Spain, Álvaro de la Quadra, for a private audience to ask how the Spanish government would react if she were to marry Robert Dudley, 1st Earl of Leicester, who had recently lost his wife Amy Robsart in a questionable accident.
- March 23 – Lope de Aguirre, a Basque Spanish conquistador, begins a rebellion against the Spanish Crown in an attempt to take over most of Spanish South America.
- March 29 – In India, the Mughal Empire Army, led by General Adham Khan defeats the Sultanate of Malwa in a battle at Sarangpur, forcing the Sultan Baz Bahadur to flee.

==== April–June ====
- April 9 – Ángel de Villafañe becomes the new Governor of Spanish Florida, assuming authority over the provinces of La Florida and of Punta de Santa Elena (now Parris Island in the U.S. state of South Carolina).
- April 14 – The citizens of Nuremberg see what appears to be an aerial battle, followed by the appearance of a large black triangular object and a large crash (with smoke) outside the city. A news notice (an early form of newspaper) is printed on April 14, describing the event.
- April 17 – Diego López de Zúñiga, 4th Count of Nieva becomes the fourth Spanish Viceroy of Peru, administering most of South America after the death on March 30 of Andrés Hurtado de Mendoza.
- April 19 – The Edict of 19 April, confirming the recent recommendation by the Estates General, is promulgated by the regency council for King Charles IX of France in an attempt to prevent a civil war between the Roman Catholic and the Protestant Huguenot citizens of France
- May 8 – Madrid is declared the capital of Spain, by Philip II.
- June 4
  - The spire of Old St Paul's Cathedral in the City of London catches fire and crashes through the nave roof, probably as the result of a lightning strike. The spire is not rebuilt.
  - The nobility of Harrien-Wierland and the town of Reval (on June 6) of the Livonian Order swear allegiance to Sweden.
- June 25 – Francis Coxe, an English astrologer, is pilloried at Cheapside in London, and makes a public confession of his involvement in "sinistral and divelysh artes".
- June 29 – Erik XIV is crowned King of Sweden.

==== July–September ====
- July 12 – Saint Basil's Cathedral in Moscow (started in 1534) is finished.
- July – Arauco War: The hated encomendero Pedro de Avendaño and two other Spaniards are killed, triggering the Second Great Rebellion of the Mapuche.
- August 19 – Mary, Queen of Scots, is denied passage through England after returning from France. She arrives at Leith, Scotland later the same day.
- August 20 – English merchant Anthony Jenkinson arrives in Moscow on his second expedition to the Grand Duchy of Moscow.
- September 2 – The Entry of Mary, Queen of Scots into Edinburgh, a civic celebration for the Queen of Scotland, is marred by religious controversy.
- September 28 – An inconclusive three day debate begins in Maybole, Ayrshire, Scotland between Protestant reformer John Knox and Quintin Kennedy, commendator of Crossraguel Abbey, on transubstantiation. The Reformation, confirmed by the Scottish government in 1560, continues.

==== October–December ====
- October 10 – The Siege of Moji in Japan ends with the defenders retaining their position.
- October 18 – Fourth Battle of Kawanakajima: Takeda Shingen defeats Uesugi Kenshin, in the climax of their ongoing conflicts.
- November 4 – Upon the death of his father, Diogo I Nkumbi a Mpudi, King Afonso II Mpemba a Nzinga becomes the new monarch of the Kingdom of Kongo, located in what is now the southern portion of the Democratic Republic of Congo and the northern portion of Angola. Afonso II reigns for less than a month before being overthrown by his brother, Bernardo.
- November 28 – The Treaty of Vilnius is concluded during the Livonian War, between the Livonian Confederation and the Polish–Lithuanian Commonwealth. With the treaty, the non-Danish and non-Swedish part of Livonia, with the exception of the Free imperial city of Riga, subjects itself to Polish king and Grand Duke of Lithuania, Sigismund II Augustus with the Pacta subiectionis (Provisio ducalis). In turn, Sigismund grants protection from the Tsardom of Russia, and confirms the Livonian estates' traditional privileges, laid out in the Privilegium Sigismundi Augusti.
- December 1 – In the Kingdom of Kongo, Bernardo Mpemba a Nzinga overthrows his brother, King Afonso II, and becomes King Bernardo I.

==== Date unknown ====
- Merchant Taylors' School is founded in the City of London by Sir Thomas White, Sir Richard Hilles, Emanuel Lucar, and Stephen Hales.
- The first Calvinists settle in England, after fleeing Flanders.
- The Anglo-Genevan metrical psalter is published, including the Old 100th, the version of the hymn All People That on Earth Do Dwell made from Psalm 100, attributed to the probably-Scottish clergyman and biblical translator William Kethe, exiled in Geneva.
- Ruy López de Segura develops modern techniques of chess playing in Spain.
- William Baldwin's Beware the Cat (written early 1553), an early example of extended fiction (specifically horror fiction) in English, is published anonymously in London. This edition appears to have been suppressed, and no copies survive.
- Between 1561 and 1670, 3,229 alleged witches are executed in southwestern Germany, most by burning.

=== 1562 ===
==== January–March ====
- January 6 – Shane O'Neill of Tír Eoghain pleads his cause at the Palace of Whitehall in London, before Queen Elizabeth I of England, who recognises his status. He returns to Ireland on May 26, and resumes his rebellious activities by November.
- January 17 – Huguenots are recognized under the Edict of Saint-Germain.
- January 18
  - The Council of Trent reconvenes, after a gap of 10 years.
  - Thomas Norton and Thomas Sackville's play Gorboduc is performed for the first time, before Queen Elizabeth I of England. It is the first known English tragedy, and the first English language play to employ blank verse.
- February 6 – In the Mughal Empire in India, the Emperor Akbar marries Mariam-uz-Zamani, daughter of Raja Bharmal, the ruler of the Kingdom of Amber. The marriage takes place in Sambhar in what is now the state of Rajasthan, where Akbar has stopped on his way back to the Mughal capital of Agra.
- February 12 – After Catherine of Austria, the former Queen Consort of Portugal decides to step down as regent for her grandson, the 8-year-old King Sebastian at the age of 55, she turns the responsibility over to her late husband's brother, Cardinal Henrique de Aviz, the younger brother of her late husband, King João III.
- February 18 – The siege of the Portuguese fort of Mazagan begins in Morocco as the Sultanate tries to take back control of the area from the Portuguese occupiers.
- March 1 – Over 80 Huguenots are massacred by the ultra-Catholic Francis, Duke of Guise in Wassy-sur-Blaise, triggering the First War of Religion in France.
- March 4 – Prince Abu Abdallah Mohammed II Saadi, heir to the throne of the Sultanate of Morocco, arrives at Mazagan with 100,000 troops.
- March 15 – English merchant Anthony Jenkinson has an audience with Ivan the Terrible in Moscow, before departing the city on April 27 and continuing his second expedition through the Grand Duchy of Moscow to Qazvin, capital of the Safavid dynasty in Persia.
- March 24 – Portuguese Navy Captain Álvaro de Carvalho reaches Mazagan in Morocco with a relief force that includes 600 well-equipped troops.1562 – O Triunfo Português no Grande Cerco a Mazagão in Barlavento Another force of 1,565 volunteers arrives on March 26 from Lisbon.

==== April–June ====
- April 2 – Civil war breaks out in the Kingdom of France as Louis I, Prince of Condé, leader of the Protestant Huguenots, declares war against the French Catholic rulers, in retaliation for the March 1 massacre of Vassy. Condé and Gaspard de Coligny seize control of Orléans, and other uprisings follow throughout France.
- May 1 – Jean Ribault, French navigator, lands in Florida, and later establishes a Huguenot colony at Charlesfort on Parris Island, South Carolina.
- May 5 – Prince Abdullah of Morocco withdraws his troops after seeing no way to overcome Portuguese defenses at Marzagan.
- May 28 – The Siege of Rouen as Claude, Duke of Aumale, leads 3,000 French government troops against the Huguenot fortress at Rouen. The siege lasts for five months. He orders a retreat in June but returns on 29 July with a larger force and heavier artillery.
- June 10 – English Catholic printer Thomas Somerset is jailed at Fleet Prison "for translating an oratyon out of Frenche, made by the Cardinall of Lorraine, and putting the same without authority in prynte." On June 27, he is summoned before the Lords of the Council for a parole hearing, but is turned down because "he seamed to go about to justifye his cause" and returned to Fleet, "there to remaine until he shall have better considered of himself." He remains imprisoned for more than 19 years before finally being released on February 28, 1582.
- June 14 – At dinner at Dunfermline Castle, Mary, Queen of Scots, displays a gold ring set with a heart shaped diamond from her collection and declares that she will send it to Queen Elizabeth of England as a gift and a possible summit conference in the future.
- June 17 Full moon of Waso 924 ME– King King Bayinnaung of Burma establishes an army garrison at Dawei in preparation for an attack against the Siamese Kingdom of Ayutthaya.

==== July–September ====
- July 12 – Fray Diego de Landa, acting Bishop of Yucatan, burns the sacred books of the Maya.
- August 3 – A severe hailstorm causes serious damage in the German town of Wiesensteig, and leads a few days later to the demand of Mayor Ulrich von Helfenstein for the arrest of several women on charges of practicing witchcraft. Six of the women are executed the first of 63 women and men put to death after being convicted of practicing sorcery.
- August 7 – The Treaty of Mozhaysk is signed between Denmark and Russia to avoid going to war against each other over the Kingdom of Livonia, now divided into Estonia and Latvia.
- August 24 – In the French city of Bar-sur-Seine, at least 300 Huguenots are massacred by Catholic soldiers after their success in reconquering the citadel there. The killing occurs nine days after the burning alive of 94 Huguenots at Lauzerte.
- September 20 – The Treaty of Hampton Court, between Queen Elizabeth I of England and Huguenot leader Louis, Prince of Condé, is signed.
- September 22 – Maximilian, son of the Emperor Ferdinand I, succeeds Ferdinand as ruler of the Kingdom of Bohemia (now the Czech Republic).

==== October–December ====
- October 4 – English forces under Ambrose Dudley, 3rd Earl of Warwick, land at Le Havre to aid the Huguenots against the French Crown.
- October 19 – La Herradura naval disaster: Twenty-five ships sink in a storm off of the coast of Spain in the bay of La Herradura, where 28 ships had been anchored to weather the elements. At least 3,000 people are killed, and perhaps as many as 5,000, while another 2,000 survivors, mostly slaves on the galleys, are able to escape to shore.
- October 26 – Rouen is captured by Royalist forces under Antoine de Bourbon, King of Navarre, who is mortally wounded.
- October – Privateer John Hawkins undertakes the first of several slave trading voyages, attacking Portuguese slave ships off the West African coast and forcibly transporting the enslaved Africans onboard to Spanish colonies in the Americas to sell. Hawkins arrives at the island of Hispaniola in the Spanish West Indies, where he illicitly sells the enslaved Africans to local colonists, as his presence is technically in violation of Spanish law.
- November 5 – Battle of Corrichie in Scotland: The rebellion of George Gordon, Earl of Huntly is crushed by James Stewart, Earl of Moray.
- November 20 – Maximilian of Bohemia is elected King of the Romans.
- December 19 – Battle of Dreux: Huguenot and Catholic forces fight a bloody battle, narrowly won by the Catholic side. The official leaders of both armies are captured in the battle.

==== Date unknown ====
- Mughal Emperor Akbar conquers Malwa, and its last Sultan, Baz Bahadur, flees.
- Dudley Grammar School is established, and Gresham's School is granted a royal charter, in England.
- Fausto Sozzini publishes Brevis explicatio in primum Johannis caput, originating Socinianism.
- Giacomo Barozzi da Vignola publishes Regola delli cinque ordini d'architettura (Rules of the Five Orders of Architecture); in succeeding centuries it will become the most published book in architectural history.
- The Pünte at Wiltshausen, a small, hand-operated ferry, which becomes a historic monument in the late 20th century, is first recorded.
- The Portuguese army is defeated at the Battle of Mulleriyawa, Sri Lanka, at the hand of the Sitawaka army commanded by Prince Tikiri Bandara (King Rajasinghe), leaving 1600 dead. This is considered the worst defeat the Portuguese have suffered up to this time.
- An arsenal in Paris explodes. As recorded by Ambroise Paré in The Workes of Ambrose Parey: "In the yeare of our Lord 1562, a quantity of this pouder [gunpowder] which was not very great, taking fire by accident in the Arcenall of Paris, caused such a tempest that the whole city shook, but it quite overturned many of the neighboring houses, and shook off the tiles and broke the windows of those which were further away; and to conclude, like a storm of lightning, it laid many here and there for dead, some lost their sight, others their hearing, and others their limbs were torn apart as if they had been rent with wild horses" (p.415).

=== 1563 ===
==== January–March ====
- January 2 (January 2, 1562 O.S., January 11, 1563 N.S.) – The convocation of bishops and clerics of the Church of England is opened at St Paul's Cathedral in London by the Dean of the Arches, Robert Weston to agree upon the wording of what will become the Thirty-nine Articles, with the assembly adopting all but three of the Forty-two Articles promulgated during the reign of King Edward VI in 1553. The conference lasts for three months before agreeing upon the Articles to be submitted for further modification.
- January 25 – In Italy, Instituto Bancario San Paolo di Torino, a constituent of the major financial group Sanpaolo IMI, is founded.
- February 1 – Sarsa Dengel succeeds his father Menas as Emperor of Ethiopia at age 14.
- February 18 – Francis, Duke of Guise, is assassinated while besieging Orléans by Jean de Poltrot.
- March 19 – The Edict of Amboise is signed at the Château d'Amboise by Catherine de' Medici, acting as regent for her son Charles IX of France, having been negotiated between the Huguenot Louis, Prince of Condé, and Anne, duc de Montmorency, Constable of France. It accords some toleration to the Huguenots, especially to aristocrats. It officially ends the first phase of the French Wars of Religion, and the combined Huguenot and royal armies then march north to besiege the English in Le Havre.

==== April–June ====
- April 5 – The English galleon ship HMS Grehound strikes a sandbar off of the coast of Rye, East Sussex and sinks with all hands in the English Channel, including the Admiral of the Narrow Seas, John Malyn.
- April 10 – Royal assent is given by Queen Elizabeth of England to parliamentary approval of multiple laws, including the Highways Act 1562 (requiring all householders in a parish to provide six days labor per year on building highways); the Poor Act 1562 (providing for fines for persons who refuse to contribute to a fund for relief of the poor); the Supremacy of the Crown Act 1562 (making refusal to swear allegiance to the monarch punishable as treason); and the Witchcraft Act 1562 (limiting the death penalty for witchcraft to cases where a defendant caused another person's death)
- April 23 – The cornerstone is laid for the construction of El Escorial, the royal palace for the monarch of Spain. Construction will not be finished for 21 more years, with completion on September 13, 1584.
- May 5 (3rd day of 4th month, Eiroku 6) – The Battle of Yudokoru takes place in Japan at the Inaba Province (now the eastern Tottori Prefecture), as Takanobu Takeda defeats the shogun Toyokazu Yamana.
- May 25 – Elizabeth College, Guernsey is founded, by order of Queen Elizabeth I of England.
- May 30 – At Bornholm, the Danish fleet fires on the Swedish navy, leading to a Danish defeat and precipitating the Northern Seven Years' War.
- June 4 – The Parliament of Scotland passes the Witchcraft Act, making both the practice of witchcraft, and the act of consulting with witches, punishable by burning at the stake.

==== July–September ====
- July 28 – The English surrender Le Havre to the French after a siege.
- August 13 – Northern Seven Years' War: Denmark–Norway and the Free City of Lübeck declare war against the Kingdom of Sweden.
- August 18 – Merchants from the Bungo Province destroy the Portuguese settlement in Yokoseura, Japan
- September 4 – Northern Seven Years' War: King Frederick II of Denmark, advancing from Halland, takes Old Älvsborg from Sweden.

==== October–December ====
- October 7 – Giovanni Battista Lercari is elected as the new Doge of the Republic of Genoa.
- November 9 – The Army of Sweden, under the command of King King Erik XIV, suffers a severe defeat in the Battle of Mared against the Army of Denmark, commanded by King Frederik II. In the battle, near what is now the city of Oskarström in Sweden, the Swedes suffer at least 2,500 casualties. The Swedish Army is able to retreat and rebuild, but the Danes plunder the village of Övraby, which is never rebuilt.
- November 11 – The Council of Trent amends existing Roman Catholic canon law to deter unannounced marriages. In order for a marriage to be recognized by the Church, the names of the bridge and groom are to be announced publicly in a chapel during Mass, and registered with the parish priests of both parties.
- December 4 – The Council of Trent (which had opened on December 13, 1545) officially closes. It reaffirms all major Roman Catholic doctrines, and declares the Deuterocanonical books of the Old Testament to be canonical, along with the rest of the Bible. Chapter 1, Session 24, promulgates the decree Tametsi, stipulating that for a marriage to be valid, consent (the essence of marriage) as expressed in the vows has to be given publicly before witnesses, one of whom has to be the parish priest.

=== 1564 ===
==== January–March ====
- January 26 – Livonian War – Battle of Ula: A Lithuanian surprise attack results in a decisive defeat of the numerically superior Russian forces.
- February 7 (11th waning of Tabodwe 925 ME) – Burmese–Siamese War: Invaders from Burma overcome the seaside defenses of the Siamese capital at Ayutthava, capturing the batteries of cannons and a set of ships sent by Portugal to help defend the kingdom.
- February 18 (8th waxing of Tabaung 925 ME) – The Burmese–Siamese War ends with the surrender of King Maha Chakkraphat of Ayutthaya (now Thailand) to King Bayinnaung of Burma). Chhakkraphat is allowed to go into exile and his son Mahinthrathirat is installed by Bayinnaung as the vassal king of Ayutthaya.
- February 19 – Francisco Coutinho III, Count of Redondo and the Viceroy of Portuguese India, dies and is succeeded by João de Mendonça Furtado
- February 20 – A group of four men assassinate the Spanish Viceroy of Peru, Diego López de Zúñiga, 4th Count of Nieva. López is succeeded temporarily by Hernando de Saavedra.
- March 25 – Battle of Angol in Chile: Spanish Conquistador Lorenzo Bernal del Mercado defeats and kills the toqui Illangulién.

==== April–June ====
- April 20 – French explorer René Goulaine de Laudonnière and a group of 300 Huguenot Protestants depart from Le Havre on three ships (L'Élisabeth , Le Faucon and Le Breton) to colonize what is now the U.S. state of Florida.
- May 31 – The Swedish warship Mars, flagship of the Swedish Navy, catches fire while fighting against the navy of Denmark in the battle of Öland off of the coast of the island of the same name in the Baltic Sea, and sinks along with its crew of 350 sailors and 450 soldiers it had been transporting. The wreckage of the ship will go undiscovered for 447 years until being found on August 19, 2011.
- June 22 – French settlers abandon Charlesfort, the first French attempt at colonizing what is now the United States, and, with the help of a relief force commanded by René Goulaine, establish Fort Caroline in Florida, near what is now the city of Jacksonville.

==== July–September ====
- July 2 In India, the Mughal Emperor Akbar departs from the capital, Agra (now located in the state of Uttar Pradesh on the pretext of hunting elephants, in order to conceal his true purpose of punishing the rebel governor of Malwa, Abdullah Khan Ubzeg.
- July 24 (Full moon of Wagaung 926 ME) – In Burma (now Myanmar), Min Sekkya becomes the new King of Arakan when his half-brother, King Min Saw Hla, dies at age 31 after a long illness.
- July 25 – Maximilian II becomes the new Holy Roman Emperor upon the death of his father, Ferdinand I. Ferdinand's son Charles succeeds his father as the new Archduke of Austria.
- August 1 – Judge Francisco Ceinos becomes the new Viceroy of New Spain upon the death of Luís de Velasco.
- August 6 – In India Akbar, ruler of the Mughal Empire, defeats the rebellious governor of Malwa, Abdullah Khan Uzbeg. The defeat comes the day after the Imperial Army's arrival at Indore, now in the Indian state of Madhya Pradesh.
- August 14 – Sweden's Army fights a second naval battle at Öland against Denmark and captures three Danish Navy ships (Böse Lejonet, Morian, and David) and 600 men.
- August 28 – King Eric XIV of Sweden, who has been commanding the Swedish Army himself since the start of the Northern Seven Years' War, turns over the responsibility to Nils Boije, who captures Varberg from Denmark.
- September 4 – The Ronneby Bloodbath takes place in Ronneby, Denmark (now in Sweden).
- September 10 – Battle of Kawanakajima in Japan: Takeda Shingen fights the forces of Uesugi Kenshin for the final time, to a draw.
- September 28 – English merchant Anthony Jenkinson returns to London from his second expedition to the Grand Duchy of Moscow, having gained a considerable extension of trading rights for the English Muscovy Company.

==== October–December ====
- October 10 – Lucrezia Di Siena, the first well-known female actress in Europe, begins her career by signing a contract with the Commedia dell'arte theatre company in Rome.
- October 23 – King Bayinnaung of Burma leads 64,000 men, 3,600 horses and 330 elephants on an invasion of the Lan Na kingdom (now part of Laos.
- October 30 – The Duchy of Savoy signs the Treaty of Lausanne with the Swiss canton of Bern and relinquishes all claims to the canton of Vaud.
- November 21 – Spanish Conquistador Miguel López de Legazpi sails from Mexico. Later, he will conquer the Philippine Islands, founding Manila.
- November 25 – When four divisions of the Burmese Army arrive at Lamphun, 12.5 miles (20.1 km) from Chiang Mai, Chiang Mai's defenses flee the city. Bayinnaung spares the life of King Mekuti of Lan Na, and then spends next four months administering the annexed territory.
- December 3 – Ivan the Terrible, Tsar of all the Russias, sends his government a letter of abdication, ostensibly because of embezzlement and treason by the aristocracy and the clergy. Ivan leaves Moscow and moves to the city of Alexandrovskaya Sloboda, taking with him the relics of the palace and most of his royal court, until being persuaded to return in February on the promise that he will have absolute power.
- December 7 – King Charles IX of France agrees to the terms of a treaty with the cantons of Switzerland, agreeing for French payment of debts owed to the Swiss for loans made to Charles's father, King Henri II.

==== Date unknown ====
- The first recorded report is made of a "rat king".
- approx. date – Idris Alooma starts to rule the Kanem-Bornu Empire.
- The first Scottish Psalter is published.

=== 1565 ===
==== January–March ====
- January 3 – In the Tsardom of Russia, Ivan the Terrible originates the oprichnina (repression of the boyars (aristocrats)).
- January 23 – Battle of Talikota: The Vijayanagara Empire, the last Hindu kingdom in South India, is greatly weakened by the Deccan sultanates.
- February 13 – Spanish Conquistador Miguel López de Legazpi lands with his troops on the shores of Cebu Island in the Philippines.
- March 1 – The city of Rio de Janeiro, Brazil, is founded as São Sebastião do Rio de Janeiro by Estácio de Sá.
- March 16 – Spanish Conquistador López de Legazpi makes a blood compact (sandugan) with Datu Sikatuna in the island of Bohol, Philippines.

==== April–June ====
- April 27 – Cebu City is established as San Miguel by López de Legazpi, becoming the first Spanish settlement in the Philippines.
- May 2 – Huntingdon Grammar School is established in England.
- May 18 – Ottoman troops land on the island of Malta, beginning the Great Siege of Malta.
- June 4 – The Treaty of Cebu is signed between Miguel López de Legazpi, representing Philip II of Spain, and Rajah Tupas of Cebu. This effectively creates Spanish suzerainty over Cebu.
- June 17 – (19th day of 5th month, Eiroku 8); In Japan, Ashikaga Yoshiteru, the Ashikaga shogun, commits ritual suicide after Matsunaga Hisahide invades Kyoto.

==== July–September ====
- July 29 – The widowed Mary, Queen of Scots, marries her half-cousin Henry Stuart, Lord Darnley, at Holyrood Palace in Edinburgh, in a Catholic ceremony.
- August 6 – Sark, in the Channel Islands, is granted as a fief by Elizabeth I of England to Hellier de Carteret, Seigneur of Saint Ouen.
- August 26 – The Chaseabout Raid begins in Scotland as a rebellion against Mary, Queen of Scots by her half-brother, by James Stewart, 1st Earl of Moray, following her July 29 marriage to Lord Darnley.
- August 28 (feast day of St. Augustine) – The Spanish fleet of Pedro Menéndez de Avilés first sights land in Florida.
- August 31 – Chaseabout Raid: Moray and at least 1,000 of his rebels arrive in Edinburgh for a confrontation with the Scottish crown. After cannon fire from Edinburgh Castle, the rebels retreat toward England to seek help. The rebellion is ended by the end of September.
- September 4 – The Spanish fleet of Pedro Menéndez de Avilés lands in Florida to oust the French under Jean Ribault. He later destroys the French colony of Fort Caroline.
- September 8 – St. Augustine, Florida (named after Augustine of Hippo), is established by Pedro Menéndez de Avilés, becoming the oldest surviving European settlement in the modern-day United States, and a mass of Thanksgiving is said.
- September 11 – The Knights of Malta lift the Great Siege of Malta after four months.

==== October–December ====
- October 11 – Ottavio Gentile Oderico is elected to a two-year term as the Doge of the Republic of Genoa.
- October 18 – Battle of Fukuda Bay: Ships belonging to the Matsura clan of Japan fail to capture a Portuguese trading carrack, in the first recorded naval battle between Japan and a European nation.
- October 20 – In the Northern Seven Years' War, the Battle of Axtorna is fought in Sweden, near Falkenberg, as Daniel Rantzau of the Army of Denmark and Norway leads 7,400 troops in defeating a counterattack by over 11,000 Swedish troops led by Jacob Henriksson Hästesko.
- October – The first Martello tower, the Tour de Mortella, designed by Giovan Giacomo Paleari Fratino (el Fratin), is completed as part of the Genovese defence system at Mortella (Myrtle) Point, in Upper Corsica.
- November 25 – The army of Burma, under the command of King Bayinnaung conquers Chiang Mai, capital of the Siamese Kingdom of Lan Na, and departs on November 30.
- December 31 – The Burmese Army conquers Vientiane, the main city of the kingdom of Lan Xang (now Laos).
- December – The Mariovo and Prilep rebellion occurs, the very first recorded rebellion by the Macedonian hajduks or voivode against the Ottoman Empire.

==== Date unknown ====
- The pencil is first documented by Conrad Gesner; it is becoming common in England.
- John Beddoes School is founded at Presteigne, Wales.
- Herlufsholm School is founded at Næstved, Denmark.
- Bungay Grammar School is established in England.

=== 1566 ===
==== January–March ====
- January 7 – Cardinal Michele Ghislieri is elected as the new Pope by two-thirds of the College of Cardinals, to succeed Pope Pius IV, who had died 28 days earlier on December 8. Ghislieri becomes the 225th pope, and takes the regnal name Pope Pius V.
- February 24 – In one of the first gun assassinations in Japanese (if not world) history, Mimura Iechika, the daimyō (warlord) of the Bitchū Province, is shot dead by two brothers (Endo Matajiro and Yoshijiro), sent by his rival Ukita Naoie.
- March 28 – The foundation stone of Valletta, which will become Malta's capital city, is laid by Jean Parisot de Valette, Grand Master of the Sovereign Military Order of Malta.
- March – The Hanseatic city of Lübeck launches the galleon Adler von Lübeck, probably the largest ship in the world at this time.

==== April–June ====
- April 5 – The Compromise of Nobles is presented to Margaret of Parma, Governor of the Habsburg Netherlands, but it succeeds only in delaying the beginning of the Eighty Years' War in the Netherlands.
- May 1
  - Charles IX, King of France, completes his grand tour of his kingdom, returning to Paris a little more than 27 months and 2,500 miles (4,000 km) after his departure on January 24, 1564.
  - Suleiman the Magnificent, the Sultan of the Ottoman Empire, begins his last campaign, departing from Constantinople at the head of one of the largest armies he has ever commanded, with a plan to attack Vienna, capital of the Holy Roman Empire. However, he dies in September.
- May 13 – Maximilian II, Holy Roman Emperor imposes a Reichsexekution upon John Frederick II, Duke of Saxony. Augustus, Elector of Saxony is directed to carry out the order to begin the siege of the city of Gotha and John Frederick's home at the Grimmenstein Castle.
- May 25 – King Philip II of Spain issues laws against the remaining Spanish Muslims, including a ban against use of the Arabic language, wearing of traditional Arab or Muslim clothing, a requirement that doors in their homes and buildings be kept open every Friday and on Muslim feast days (in order to verify that Muslim rituals are not observed), and forces the tearing down of public and private bathhouses (to prevent purification rites).
- May 30 – The Augsburg Imperial Coin Edict issues from the Holy Roman Empire, authorizing a new coin, the thaler. The new unit of money, the Reichsthaler, follows standards providing that the weight should be based on one-ninth of a Cologne mark of silver (the "9 Thaler standard") with each minted coin to weigh 29.23 grams and to contain 25.96 grams of silver. The word thaler, an abbreviation for the "Joachimsthaler" minted from the silver mines at Joachimsthal (modern-day Jáchymov in the Czech Republic), is anglicized to dollar, the name of currencies in many nations.
- June 10 – In Znojmo (in the modern-day Czech Republic), Wilhelm von Rosenberg, commander of the Army of the Kingdom of Bohemia, begins raising an army to fight an expected invasion by the Ottoman Empire.

==== July–September ====
- July 22 – Pope Pius V issues an edict to expel most prostitutes from Rome, and the Papal States. The edict is soon reversed because of the loss of revenue from the taxation of houses of prostitution.
- July 25 – Feodor Stefanovich Kolychov is consecrated as the patriarch of the Russian Orthodox Church as Philip II, Metropolitan of Moscow with the approval of the Tsar Ivan the Terrible, but soon defies the Tsar. Philip will be deposed in 16 months later and put to death on December 23, 1568.
- July 28 – John Sigismund Zápolya, uncrowned claimant to the throne of the King of Hungary, leads an invasion of Upper Hungary on the orders of Ottoman Sultan Suleiman.
- July 31 – King Philip II of Spain sends a final letter to the administrators and Catholic bishops of the Spanish Netherlands, rejecting a request to abolish ordinances treating Protestants as heretics. The decision leads to an uprising against Spain by Calvinists and ultimately to the Eighty Years War.
- August 6 – The siege of Szigetvár is begun by Suleiman the Magnificent, Sultan of the Ottoman Empire. This is the Ottoman Empire at its greatest extent.
- August 10 – The Beeldenstorm, also called the "Iconoclastic Fury", begins as Protestant Calvinists engage in widespread destruction of religious art in the what are now the Netherlands and Belgium.
- August 16 – The Beeldenstorm arrives at Ypres and the St Martin's Cathedral is plundered, with the library and artifiacts of Bishop Martin Rythovius burned.
- August 25 – The vandalism of the Beeldenstorm reaches Leiden.
- September 7 – Suleiman the Magnificent dies in his tent of natural causes aged 71 the day before the end of the siege of Szigetvár, and Selim II succeeds him as Sultan of the Ottoman Empire.
- September 8 – The siege of Szigetvár ends in a fierce battle with the annihilation of 2,300 Hungarian and Croatian defenders, including their general, Nikola Šubić Zrinski, annihilated by an army of 90,000 soldiers of the Ottoman Empire, under Sokollu Mehmed Pasha. Before charging out with his remaining 600 troops, General Zrinski orders the gates to the fortress to be opened and fires a large cannon, loaded with broken iron, killing hundreds of Ottoman attackers as they enter. As a final measure, according to one source, Zrinski orders a long fuse to be lit to the fortress gunpowder magazine and the powder explodes while thousands of Ottomans are inside.

==== October–December ====
- October 2 – Richard Onslow (Solicitor General) is elected as the Speaker of the English House of Commons by a vote of 82 to 70.
- October 8 – Catherine of the Austrian Habsburgs, Queen of consort of Poland since 1553 as wife of Sigismund II Augustus, leaves Poland to return to Austria after the failure of her marriage. She never comes back to Poland, though she remains the official queen consort until her death in 1572.
- October 19 – Gastón de Peralta, 3rd Marquess of Falces becomes the Viceroy of New Spain, replacing Francisco Ceinos. Peralta is removed from office by King Philip II after charges are made that Peralta is planning a rebellion against the crown.
- October 28 – In Kneiphof, a city in the Duchy of Prussia (modern-day Ostrov Immanuinga Kanta in Russia), Albert, Duke of Prussia has three of the town's five councilors beheaded on charges of causing political and religious disputes with the other Prussian states. Johann Funck, Matthias Horst, and Hans Schnell are executed in the town's marketplace, while Paul Skalich and Johann Steinbach are able to flee the country.
- November 5 – Queen Elizabeth I of England addresses the English Parliament and champions English nationalism, asking "Was I not born in this realm? Were my parents born in any foreign country? Is there any cause I should alienate myself from being careful over this country? Is not my kingdom here?"
- November 23 – By decree of King Philip II of Spain, the content of gold in the Spanish gold escudo, is raised from 350 maravedis (equivalent to 338 centigrams) of gold to 400 (386 cg) and equivalent to 16 silver reales.
- November 26 – At the Craigmillar Castle, the advisers to Mary, Queen of Scots – James Stewart, 1st Earl of Moray; Secretary of State William Maitland of Lethington; Lord Chancellor George Gordon, 5th Earl of Huntly; Archibald Campbell, 5th Earl of Argyll; and James Hepburn, 4th Earl of Bothwell – advise her to divorce her husband, Henry Stuart, Lord Darnley. She refuses and the advisers decide that Darnley must be killed.
- December 17 – The baptism of Prince James, son of Mary Queen of Scots, takes place at Stirling Castle

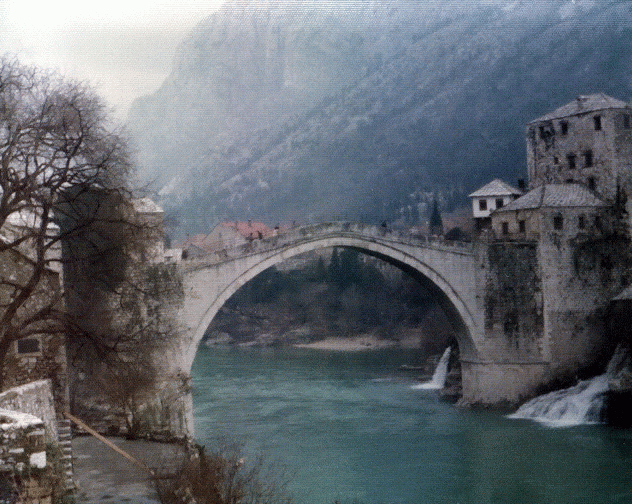
The Stari Most bridge

==== Date unknown ====
- Between July 19, 1566 and July 7, 1567 (during the Islamic calendar year 974 AH) – The first bridge crossing the Neretva River at Mostar (in Herzegovina is completed by the Ottoman Empire. The white marble bridge becomes known as Stari Most ("Old Bridge").

=== 1567 ===
==== January–March ====
- January 20 – Battle of Rio de Janeiro: Portuguese forces under the command of Estácio de Sá definitively drive the French out of Rio de Janeiro.
- January 23 – After 45 years' reign, the Jiajing Emperor, Zhu Houcong, dies in the Forbidden City of China.
- January – A Spanish force under the command of Captain Juan Pardo establishes Fort San Juan, in the Native American settlement of Joara. The fort is the first European settlement in present-day North Carolina.
- February 4 – Prince Zhu Zaiji, son of the Jiajing Emperor, becomes the ascends the throne of Ming Dynasty China as the Longqing Emperor.
- February 10 – Henry Stuart, Lord Darnley, husband of Mary, Queen of Scots, is murdered at the Provost's House in Kirk o' Field, Edinburgh.
- March 13 – Battle of Oosterweel: A Spanish mercenary army surprises and kills a band of rebels near Antwerp in the Habsburg Netherlands, beginning the Eighty Years' War.

==== April–June ====
- April 9 – In India, the Battle of Thanesar is fought in what is now the Indian state of Haryana. The Mughal Emperor Akbar, with 300 men, wins a victory over more than 7,000 warriors of the Sanyasi Hindu sect. Akbar's army has two cannons, 400 rifles and 75 elephants.
- April 10 – Henrique I Nerika a Mpudi becomes the new ruler of the Kingdom of Kongo in what is now the western part of the Democratic Republic of the Congo and the northern portion of Angola. Henrique succeeds his nephew, Bernardo I of Kongo
- April 12 – The Earl of Bothwell is acquitted on charges of murder in the February 10 killing of Lord Darnley, the husband of Mary Queen of Scots. Upon acquittal he makes plans to become Mary's new husband.
- April 20 – The Ainslie Tavern Bond is signed by a group of Scottish clerics and nobles recommends Bothwell as an appropriate husband for Queen Mary and approves his acquittal after trial for the murder of her previous husband.
- April 24 – Bothwell takes Mary prisoner at his castle at Dunbar after preventing her from traveling from her palace to Edinburgh, then rapes her.
- May 15 – Mary, Queen of Scots, marries the Earl of Bothwell, under duress.
- May 24 – Sture Murders: The mentally unstable King Erik XIV of Sweden and his guards murder five incarcerated nobles at Uppsala Castle.
- June 15 – Mary, Queen of Scots, is defeated by Scottish nobles at the Battle of Carberry Hill and imprisoned in Lochleven Castle.

==== July–September ====
- July 24 – Mary, Queen of Scots, is forced to abdicate, and replaced by her one-year-old son James VI.
- July 25 – The city of Santiago de León de Caracas is founded by Diego de Losada.
- July 29 – James VI is crowned at Stirling.
- August 22 – The Duke of Alba is sent to the Netherlands with a strong Spanish force, to suppress unrest there. He replaces Margaret of Parma as Governor of the Netherlands. Prince William of Orange is outlawed, and Lamoral, Count of Egmont imprisoned.
- September 9 – At a dinner, the Duke of Alba arrests Lamoral, Count of Egmont and Philip de Montmorency, Count of Horn for treason.
- September 27 – After the 2-week Siege of Inabayama Castle, the Oda clan capture Gifu Castle from the Saitō clan in Japan.
- September 29 – The Second War of Religion begins in France, when Louis, Prince of Condé and Gaspard de Coligny fail in an attempt to capture King Charles IX and his mother at Meaux. The Huguenots do capture several cities (including Orléans), and march on Paris.

==== October–December ====
- October 7 – Bible translations into Welsh: The New Testament is first published in Welsh, in William Salesbury's translation from the Greek.
- November 10 – Battle of Saint-Denis: Anne de Montmorency, with 16,000 Royalists, falls on Condé's 3,500 Huguenots. The Huguenots surprisingly hold on for some hours before being driven off. Montmorency is mortally wounded.
- November 21 (10th day of 11th month, Eiroku 10) – In Japan, the Tōdai-ji Great Buddha Hall in the Nara Prefecture is destroyed after a six-month siege by Matsunaga Hisahide against Miyoshi Nagaitsu and the Miyoshi clan. Reconstruction of the temple does not take place until 140 years later in 1709.
- December 4 – Antão de Noronha, Viceroy of Portuguese India (now the Indian state of Goa) issues decrees prohibiting the public performance of Hindu rituals for marriages, cremations, and sacred thread wearing. Other rules require all natives 15 or older to attend Christian religious services, upon penalty of punishment.
- December 12 – The Scottish Parliament votes to approve the Act Anent the demission of the Crown in favour of our Sovereign Lord, and his Majesty's Coronation 1567, an act regarding the abdication of Mary Queen of Scots in favor of her son James VI and the coronation of James, and confirms James as the legal ruler. Mary's half brother, James Stewart, 1st Earl of Moray, is appointed as the regent to rule on behalf of the 18-month-old King of Scotland. In that Moray is absent from Scotland at the time, the Parliament appoints a committee of seven deputy regents to rule on behalf of Moray's power to rule on behalf of King James.

==== Date unknown ====
- King Frederick II of Denmark and Norway founds Fredrikstad in Norway.
- Construction of Villa Capra "La Rotonda" in Vicenza, designed by Andrea Palladio, begins. It will be one of the most influential designs in the history of architecture.
- Rugby School, one of the oldest public schools in England, is founded.
- Although sparse maritime trade existed since its founding, the Ming dynasty government of China officially revokes the haijin maritime trade ban, reinstating foreign trade with all countries except Japan.

=== 1568 ===
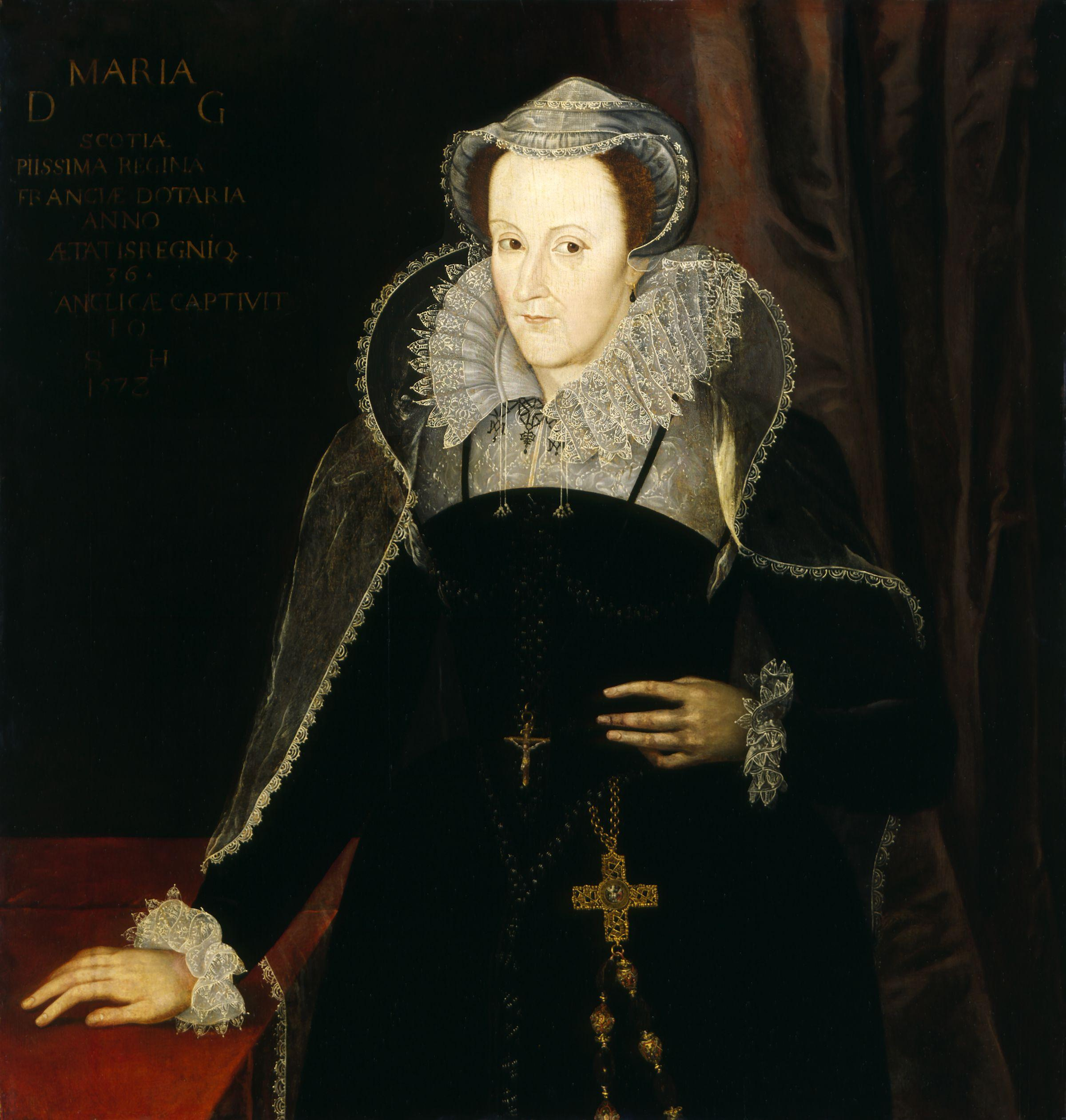
May: Mary, Queen of Scots, flees to England.

==== January–March ====
- January 6 – In the Eastern Hungarian Kingdom, the delegates of Unio Trium Nationum to the Diet of Torda convene in a session that ends on January 13, during which freedom of religion is debated.
- January 28 – The Edict of Torda, Europe's first declaration of religious freedom, is adopted by the Kingdom of Hungary.
- February 7 – Members of a Spanish expedition, commanded by Álvaro de Mendaña de Neira, become the first Europeans to see the Solomon Islands, landing at Santa Isabel Island.
- February 16 – The Inquisition in the Netherlands condemns virtually the entire population of the Spanish Netherlands to death.
- February 17 – Treaty of Adrianople (sometimes called the Peace of Adrianople): The Habsburgs agree to pay tribute to the Ottomans.
- February 23 – Akbar the Great of the Mughal Empire captures the massive Chittor Fort in northern India after a siege that began on October 23, 1567.
- February 28 – French Huguenots begin the Siege of Chartres, but fail to take the walled city after 15 days.
- March 23 – The Peace of Longjumeau ends the Second War of Religion in France. Again Catherine de' Medici and Charles IX make substantial concessions to the Huguenots.

==== April–June ====
- April 23 – Eighty Years' War: The Battle of Dahlen takes place in the Duchy of Jülich near the modern-day Rheindahlen borough in the German city of Mönchengladbach, North Rhine-Westphalia. Spanish troops, commanded by Sancho d'Avila, overwhelm a larger force of Dutch rebels led by Jean de Montigny, Lord of Villers.
- May 2 – The deposed Mary, Queen of Scots, escapes from Lochleven Castle.
- May 13 – Marian civil war in Scotland: Battle of Langside – The forces of Mary, Queen of Scots, are defeated by a confederacy of Scottish Protestants under James Stewart, 1st Earl of Moray, regent of Scotland and her half-brother.
- May 16 – Mary, Queen of Scots, flees across the Solway Firth from Scotland to England but on May 19 is placed in custody in Carlisle Castle on the orders of Queen Elizabeth I of England, her cousin.
- May 23 – Battle of Heiligerlee: Troops under Louis of Nassau, brother of William the Silent, defeat a smaller loyalist force under the Duke of Arenberg, in an attempt to invade the Northern Netherlands. This effectively begins the Eighty Years' War.
- June 1 – A mass execution is carried out in the Spanish Netherlands at Sablon, near Brussels, as 18 persons who signed the Compromise of Nobles on April 5, 1566, are beheaded.
- June 13 – Thomas Lancaster is consecrated as the Archbishop of Armagh, spiritual leader of the Church of Ireland, succeeding Archbishop Adam Loftus.
- June 27 – Ottoman pirate Kılıç Ali Pasha, formerly Italian farmer Giovanni Dionigi Galeni, is appointed as the Ottoman Beylerbey of Ottoman Algeria by the Sultan Selim II.

==== July–September ====
- July 21 – Battle of Jemmingen: The main Spanish army of the Duke of Alba utterly defeats Louis of Nassau's invading army in the Northeastern Netherlands.
- August 18 – The Third War of Religion begins in France, after an unsuccessful attempt by the Royalists to capture Condé and Coligny, the Huguenot leaders.
- September 24 – Battle of San Juan de Ulúa (Anglo-Spanish War): In the Gulf of Mexico, a Spanish fleet forces English privateers under John Hawkins to end their campaign.
- September 29 – The Swedish king Eric XIV is deposed by his half-brothers John and Charles. John proclaims himself king John III the next day.

==== October–December ====
- October 5 – William the Silent invades the southeastern Netherlands.
- October 18 — Ashikaga Yoshiaki is installed as Shōgun, beginning the Azuchi–Momoyama period in Japan.
- October 20 – Battle of Jodoigne: Spanish forces under the Duke of Alba destroy William the Silent's rearguard and William abandons his offensive.
- November 12 – Dutch rebels commanded by William the Silent defeat Spanish Habsburg troops led by Sancho d'Avila in the battle of Le Quesnoy in northern France.
- November 22 – The second treaty of Roskilde is signed between representatives of the Kingdom of Denmark and the Kingdom of Sweden to end the Northern Seven Years' War. Sweden cedes the Duchy of Estonia (Estland) to Danish control.
- November 27 – Burmese–Siamese War: Dispatched by King Bayinnaung, 55,000 Burmese troops arrive at Phitsanulok (in modern-day Thailand) and drive back the attack by armies from the Ayutthaya Kingdom (Thailand) Lan Xang (Laos), then prepare to invade Ayutthaya to put down the rebellion by Ayutthayan King Maha Chakkraphat
- December 24 – The Morisco Revolt against King Philip II of Spain begins as Aben Humeya (formerly Fernando de Válor) is proclaimed as King of the Granadan rebels.
- December 28 – Ludwig III becomes the Duke of Württemberg in German Bavaria after the death of his father, Christoph.

==== Date unknown ====
- The Russo-Turkish War begins in Astrakhan.
- Álvaro I succeeds his stepfather Henrique I as ruler of the Kingdom of Kongo forming the Kwilu dynasty that rules the kingdom without interruption until May 1622.
- Polybius' The Histories are first translated into English, by Christopher Watson.

=== 1569 ===
==== January–March ====
- January 11 — The first recorded lottery in England begins and continues, nonstop, at the west door of St Paul's Cathedral for almost five months. Each share costs ten shillings, and proceeds are used to repair harbours, and for other public works.
- February 26 — Pope Pius V issues a papal bull expelling all Jews from Italian and French territories.
- March 13 – Battle of Jarnac: Royalist troops under Marshal Gaspard de Tavannes surprise and defeat the Huguenots under the Prince of Condé, who is captured and murdered. A substantial proportion of the Huguenot army manages to escape, under Gaspard de Coligny.

==== April–June ====
- April 15 – Burmese–Siamese War: In what is now Thailand, Mahinthrathirat reclaims the throne of the Ayutthaya Kingdom upon the death of King Maha Chakkraphat.
- May 6 – England's St. Paul Cathedral lottery ends with the selection of a winner.
- May 8 – King Bayinnaung of Burma puts down the revolt by Setthathirath of Lan Xang (now Laos), and ending Lan Xang's attempt to rescue Thailand's Ayutthaya Kingdom from conquest.
- May 31 – Kasim Pasha of the Ottoman Empire begins the Ottoman attempt to conquer Astrakhan with tens of thousands of troops and a plan to build a canal between the Black Sea to the Caspian Sea to send Ottoman ships on the conquest. The attempt to build a canal proves to be unfeasible.
- June 10 – German Protestant troops reinforce Coligny, near Limoges.

==== July–September ====
- July 1 – The Union of Lublin unites the Kingdom of Poland and the Grand Duchy of Lithuania into a single state, the Polish–Lithuanian Commonwealth, following votes in the Assemblies of three Lithuanian provinces (Volhynia, Ukraine and Podlasie) in favour of the incorporation.
- July 24 – Huguenot forces under Gaspard II de Coligny and 15-year-old Prince Henry of Navarre begin the siege of Poitiers, a Roman Catholic stronghold. The siege fails and the Huguenots depart on September 7.
- August 2 – Burma invades Siam and captures Ayutthaya. Siam becomes a vassal of Burma.
- August 24 – Battle of Orthez: Huguenot forces under Gabriel, comte de Montgomery defeat Royalist forces under General Terride, in French Navarre. Catholics surrender under the condition that their lives will be spared. Huguenots agree, but then massacre the Catholics anyway.
- September 7 – A Royalist army under the Duc d'Anjou and Marshal Tavannes forces Coligny to abandon the siege of Poitiers.
- September 17 – Pope Pius V issues the papal bull Consueverunt Romani Pontifices setting specific elements for the devotion of the Rosary.
- September 26 – Kasim Pasha ends his attempt to conquer Astrakhan after realizing that his troops have only one month's supply of food left.
- September 28 – The first complete printed Bible in a Spanish translation (La Biblia), made by Casiodoro de Reina, is published in Basel.
- September 29 – Maha Thammarachathirat is installed by the Burmese Army as the vassal king of Ayutthaya.

==== October–December ====
- October 3 – Battle of Moncontour: The Royalist forces of Gaspard de Saulx Tavannes and the Duc d'Anjou defeat Gaspard II de Coligny's Huguenots, killing 8,000 and taking 3,000 prisoner.
- November 9 – The Rising of the North begins in England as the Earl of Westmorland and the Earl of Northumberland, both Catholic nobles, set off from Brancepeth Castle in County Durham with 700 men, in hopes of overthrowing Queen Elizabeth I of England, and placing the Catholic Mary, Queen of Scots, on the English throne.
- November 11 — Danish General Daniel Rantzau arrives at the Swedish held Varberg castle at Halland and orders his artillery to shell the castle with cannon fire. The Swedish defenders fire back with their own artillery and Rantzau's head is taken off by a cannonball on the first day.
- November 14 — The siege of Varberg Castle by Denmark ends after three days of shelling the Swedish defenders.
- November 26 — Francisco Álvarez de Toledo becomes the new Spanish Viceroy of Peru, succeeding Lope García de Castro as the governor-general of all Spanish territory in South America.
- December 2 — The Catholic army of the Duc d'Anjou inflicts another defeat on the Huguenots of Coligny, successfully besieging Saint-Jean-d'Angély.
- December 6 — The Kanbara castle, held by the Hōjō clan in what is now the Shizuoka Prefecture of Japan falls after a siege by Takeda Katsuyori of the Takeda clan. Hōjō Ujinobu, who had 1,000 men defending, commits suicide after the defeat.
- December 13 — An English counterattack against the Northern rebels begins as Thomas Radclyffe, 3rd Earl of Sussex, marches from York with 10,000 men against the rebels' 6,000. The rebels disperse and flee northward back to Scotland, ending the Rising of the North.

==== Dates unknown ====
- The Mercator projection is first used in Gerardus Mercator's world map, Nova et Aucta Orbis Terrae Descriptio ad Usum Navigantium Emendata.
- A conspiracy with the intent to depose John III of Sweden and reinstate the imprisoned Eric XIV of Sweden on the Swedish throne is exposed in Sweden.
- The trade compact of 1536 is renewed, exempting French merchants from Ottoman law, and allowing them to travel, buy and sell throughout the sultan's dominions, and to pay low customs duties on French imports and exports.
- Akbar founds Fatehpur Sikri, to honor the Muslim holy man Shaikh Salim Chisti, who has foretold the birth of Akbar's son and heir, Jahangir.

== Births ==
1560

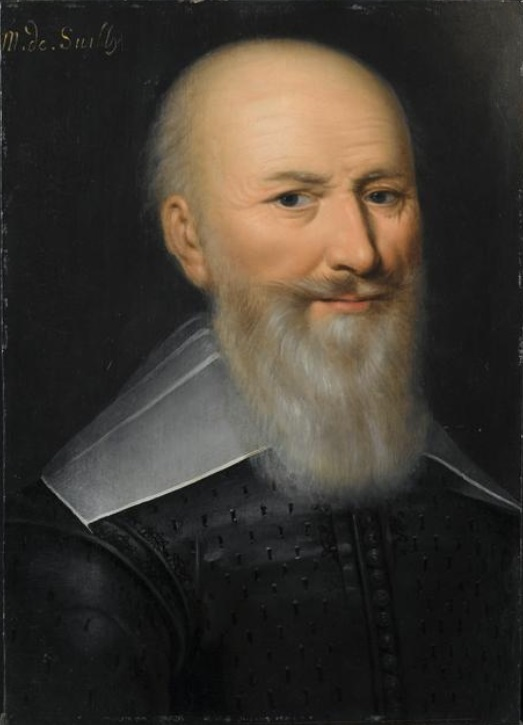
Maximilien de Béthune, Duke of Sully

- January 17 – Gaspard Bauhin, Swiss botanist (d. 1624)
- January 29 – Scipione Dentice, Neapolitan keyboard composer (d. 1633)
- March 13 – William Louis, Count of Nassau-Dillenburg, Dutch count (d. 1620)
- March 29 – Erekle I, Prince of Mukhrani, Georgian noble (d. 1605)
- April 19 – Count Jobst of Limburg (d. 1621)
- May 6 – Guido Pepoli, Italian Catholic cardinal (d. 1599)
- June 25 – Wilhelm Fabry, German surgeon (d. 1634)
- June 28 – Giovanni Paolo Lascaris, Italian Grand Master of the Knights Hospitaller (d. 1657)
- July 1 – Charles III de Croÿ, Belgian noble (d. 1612)
- July 7 – Margaret Clifford, Countess of Cumberland, English noblewoman and maid of honor to Elizabeth I (d. 1616)
- August 6 – Antoine Arnauld, French lawyer (d. 1619)
- August 7 – Elizabeth Báthory, Hungarian noblewoman and purported serial killer (d. 1614)
- August 10 – Hieronymus Praetorius, German composer (d. 1629)
- August 19 – James Crichton, Scottish polymath (d. 1582)
- August 25 – Park Jin, Korean naval commander (d. 1597)
- September 4 – Charles I, Count Palatine of Zweibrücken-Birkenfeld (d. 1600)
- September 19 – Thomas Cavendish, English naval explorer, leader of the third expedition to circumnavigate the globe (d. 1592)
- October 10 – Jacobus Arminius, Dutch theologian (d. 1609)
- October 17 – Ernest Frederick, Margrave of Baden-Durlach (d. 1604)
- October 29 – Christian I, Elector of Saxony (d. 1591)
- November 3 – Annibale Carracci, Italian painter (d. 1609)
- November 22 – Charles, Margrave of Burgau, German nobleman (d. 1618)
- November 28 – Baltasar Marradas, Count of Spain (d. 1638)
- December 3 – Jan Gruter, Dutch critic and scholar (d. 1627)
- December 13 – Maximilien de Béthune, Duke of Sully, 2nd Prime Minister of France (d. 1641)
- December 28 – Samuel Sandys, English politician (d. 1623)
- December 29 – Wolfgang Ernst I of Isenburg-Büdingen-Birstein, German count (d. 1633)
- date unknown
  - Felice Anerio, Italian composer (d. 1614)
  - Marco Antonio de Dominis, Dalmatian archbishop and apostate (d. 1624)
  - Amalia von Hatzfeld, Swedish countess governor (d. 1628)
  - Lieven de Key, Dutch architect (d. 1627)
  - Ishida Mitsunari, Japanese samurai (d. 1600)
  - Hugh Myddelton, Welsh businessman (d. 1631)
  - Anton Praetorius, German pastor (d. 1613)
- probable
  - Jan Karol Chodkiewicz, Polish military commander (d. 1621)
  - Adam Haslmayr, Tyrolean commentator on Rosicrucian manifestos (d. 1630)
  - Ketevan the Martyr, Georgian queen and saint (d. 1624)

1561

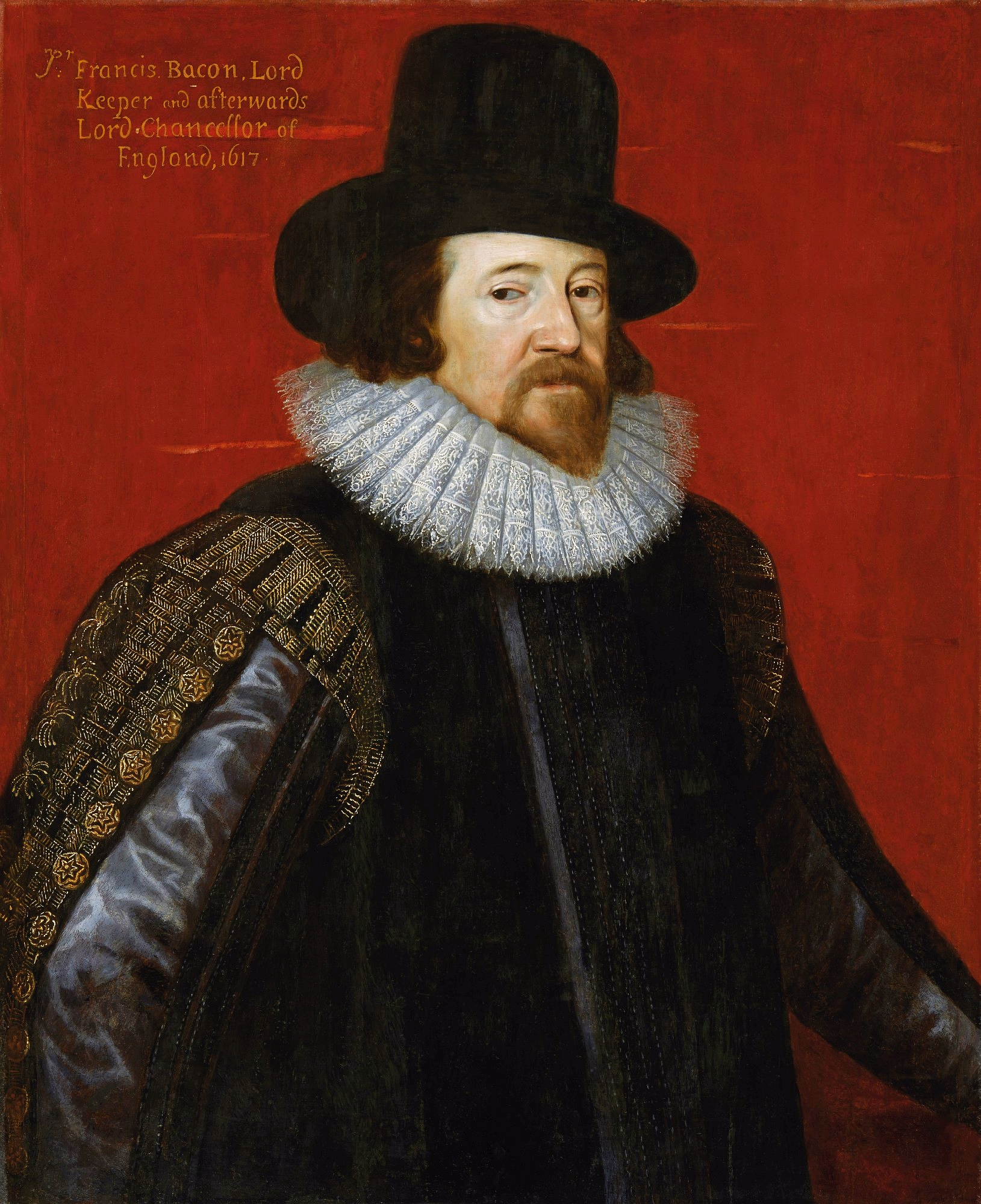
Francis Bacon

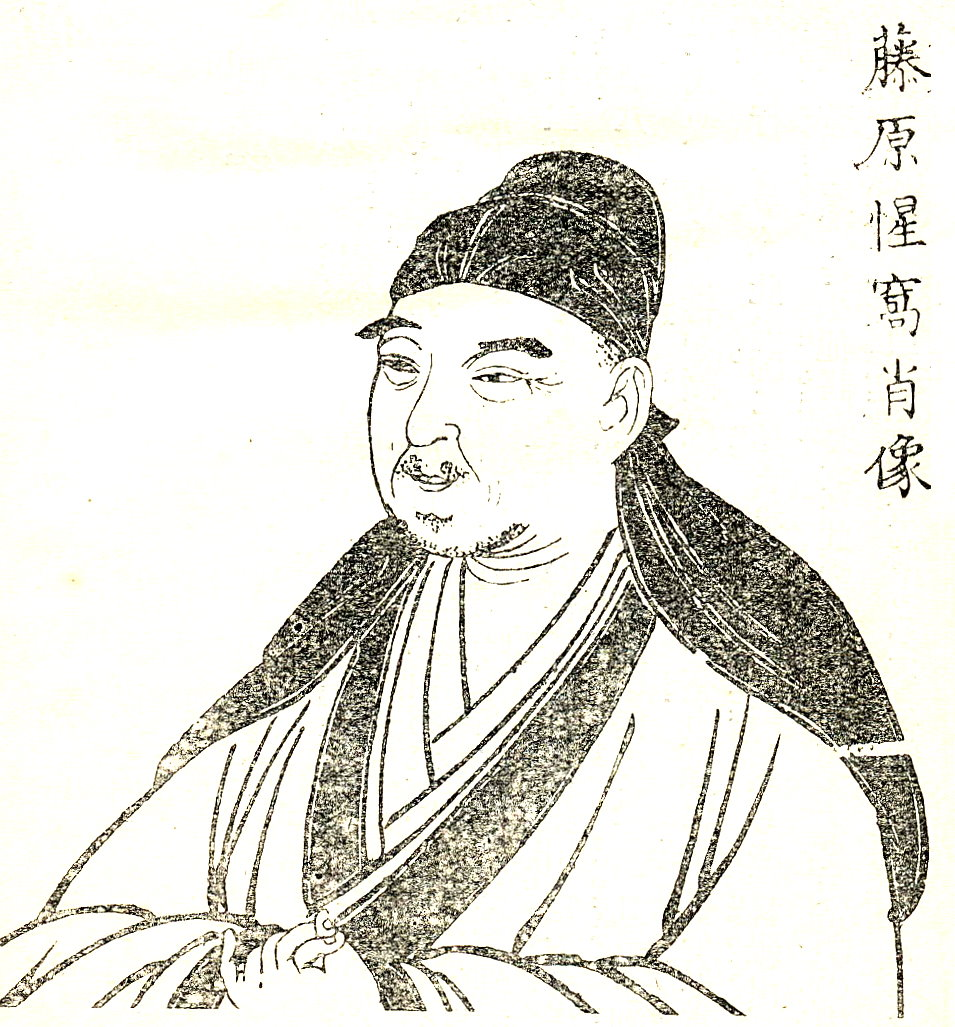
Fujiwara Seika

- January 1 – Thomas Walsingham, English literary patron (d. 1630)
- January 6 – Thomas Fincke, Danish mathematician and physicist (d. 1656)
- January 22 – Sir Francis Bacon, English philosopher, scientist, and statesman (d. 1626)
- January 24 – Camillo Cortellini, Italian composer (d. 1630)
- February 1 – Henry Briggs, British mathematician (d. 1630)
- February 8 – Fujiwara Seika, Japanese philosopher (d. 1619)
- February 15 – Johannetta of Sayn-Wittgenstein, German noblewoman (d. 1622)
- February 25 – Edward Talbot, 8th Earl of Shrewsbury, English politician and earl (d. 1617)
- March 9 – Archduke Wenceslaus of Austria, Archduke of Austria (d. 1578)
- March 29 – Santorio Santorio, Italian biologist (d. 1636)
- April 8
  - Thiri Thudhamma Yaza of Martaban, Viceroy of Martaban (d. 1584)
  - Dominicus Baudius, Dutch historian and poet (d. 1613)
- June – Samuel Harsnett, Archbishop of York (d. 1631)
- June 7 – John VII, Count of Nassau-Siegen (d. 1623)
- June 12 – Anna of Württemberg, German princess (d. 1616)
- June 13 – Anna Maria of Anhalt, German noblewoman (d. 1605)
- June 20 (bapt.) – Richard Whitbourne, English colonist of Newfoundland (d. 1635)
- June 24 – Matthias Hafenreffer, German Lutheran theologian (d. 1619)
- June 26 – Erdmuthe of Brandenburg, Duchess of Pomerania-Stettin (d. 1623)
- July 2 – Christoph Grienberger, Austrian astronomer (d. 1636)
- July 11 – Luís de Góngora y Argote, Spanish poet (d. 1627)
- July 17 – Jacopo Corsi, Italian composer (d. 1602)
- July 24 – Maria of the Palatinate-Simmern, Duchess consort of Södermanland (1579–1589) (d. 1589)
- August 14 – Christopher Heydon, English politician (d. 1623)
- August 20 – Jacopo Peri, Italian composer (d. 1633)
- August 24
  - Thomas Howard, 1st Earl of Suffolk (d. 1626)
  - Bartholomaeus Pitiscus, German astronomer and mathematician (d. 1613)
- August 25 – Philippe van Lansberge, Dutch astronomer (d. 1632)
- September 1 – Gervase Helwys, English murderer (d. 1615)
- September 3 – Yi Eokgi, Korean admiral (d. 1597)
- September 10 – Hernando Arias de Saavedra, Spanish colonial governor (d. 1634)
- September 21 – Edward Seymour, Viscount Beauchamp, son of Edward Seymour Sr. (d. 1612)
- September 28 – Roland Lytton, English politician (d. 1615)
- September 29 – Adriaan van Roomen, Belgian mathematician (d. 1615)
- October 11 (bapt.) – Thomas Lake, English Secretary of State to King James I (d. 1630)
- October 15 – Richard Field, English cathedral dean (d. 1616)
- October 24 – Anthony Babington, English criminal (d. 1586)
- October 27 – Mary Sidney, English writer, patroness and translator (d. 1621)
- November 1 – Francesco Usper, Italian composer (d. 1641)
- November 16 – Andreas Angelus, German pastor, teacher, chronicler of the Mark of Brandenburg (d. 1598)
- December 1 – Sophie Hedwig of Brunswick-Wolfenbüttel, duchess consort of Pomerania-Wolgast (1577–1592) (d. 1631)
- December 7 – Kikkawa Hiroie, Japanese politician (d. 1625)
- December 9 – Edwin Sandys, English founder of the colony of Virginia (d. 1629)
- December 16 – Amandus Polanus, German theologian of early Reformed orthodoxy (d. 1610)
- date unknown – Stephen Bachiler, non-conformist minister and pioneer settler of New England (d. 1656)

1562

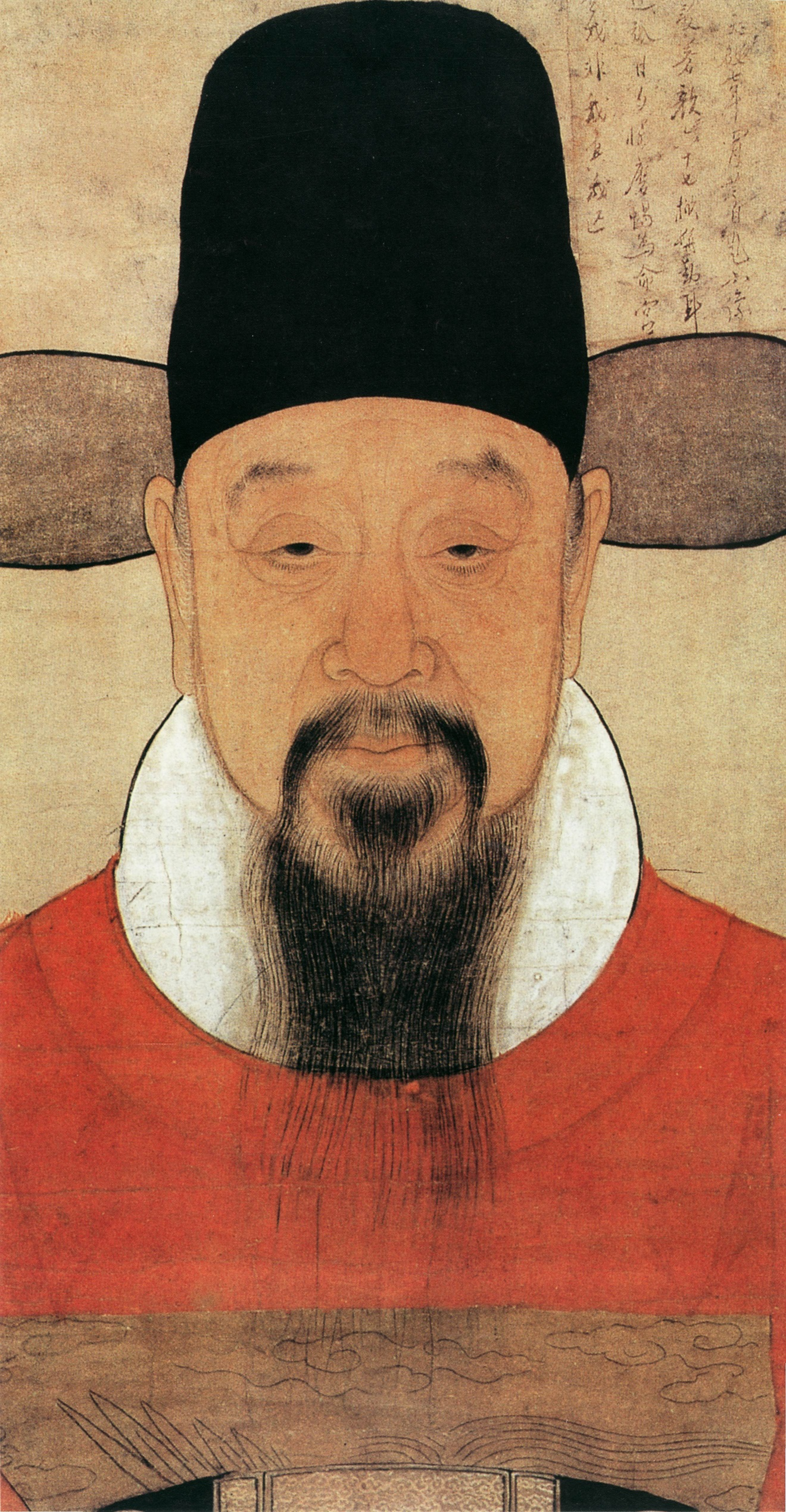
Xu Guangqi

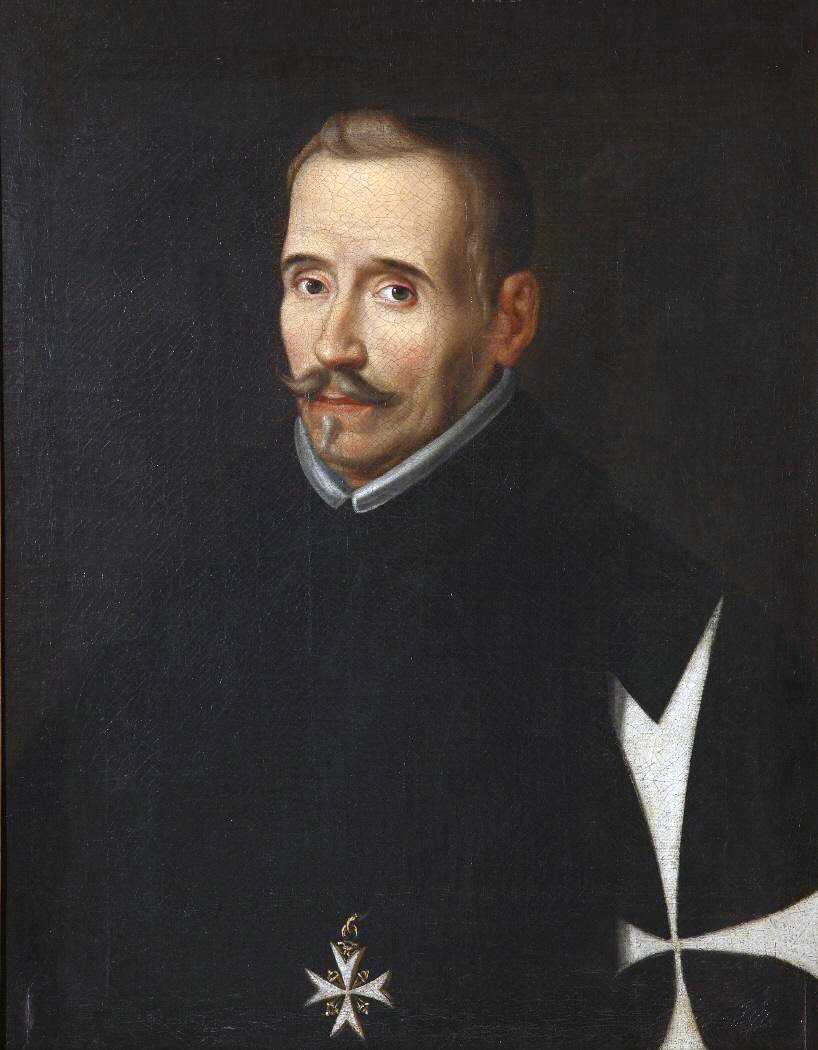
Lope de Vega

- January – Edward Blount, English publisher (d. 1632)
- January 12 – Charles Emmanuel I, Duke of Savoy (d. 1630)
- January 20
  - Maria of Hanau-Münzenberg, German noblewoman (d. 1605)
  - Ottavio Rinuccini, Italian composer (d. 1621)
- February 15
  - Rascas de Bagarris, French scholar (d. 1620)
  - Maeda Toshinaga, Japanese daimyō (noble) (d. 1614)
- April or May – Jan Pieterszoon Sweelinck, Dutch composer (d. 1621)
- April 21 – Valerius Herberger, German theologian (d. 1627)
- April 24 – Xu Guangqi, Ming Dynasty Chinese politician, agronomist, astronomer, mathematician and lay Catholic leader (d. 1633)
- April 25 – Friedrich Wilhelm I, Duke of Saxe-Weimar, German noble (d. 1602)
- May 6 – Pietro Bernini, Italian sculptor (d. 1629)
- May 26 – James III, Margrave of Baden-Hachberg (d. 1590)
- May 28 – John William, Duke of Jülich-Cleves-Berg (d. 1609)
- June 24 – Duke François de Joyeuse, French churchman and politician (d. 1615)
- June 26 – Anne of Ostfriesland, German noble, Electress Palatine (d. 1621)
- July 25 – Katō Kiyomasa, Japanese samurai (d. 1611)
- August 17 (bapt.) – Hans Leo Hassler, German composer (d. 1612)
- August 19 – Charles II de Bourbon-Vendôme, French cardinal (d. 1594)
- September 1 – George, Count of Nassau-Dillenburg (1607–1620) and (1620–1623) (d. 1623)
- September 21 – Vincenzo Gonzaga, Duke of Mantua and Montferrat (1587–1612) (d. 1612)
- September 24 – Ercole, Lord of Monaco, Monegasque noble (d. 1604)
- October 4 – Christian Sørensen Longomontanus, Danish astronomer (d. 1647)
- October 19 – George Abbot, Archbishop of Canterbury (d. 1633)
- November 25 – Lope de Vega, Spanish poet and dramatist (d. 1635)
- December 10 – Roger de Saint-Lary de Termes, French noble (d. 1646)
- December 14 – Sir Lionel Tollemache, 1st Baronet, English baronet (d. 1621)
- December 18 – Philipp Dulichius, German composer (d. 1631)
- date unknown
  - Isabella Andreini, Italian actress (d. 1604)
  - John Bull, English composer (d. 1628)
  - Samuel Daniel, English poet and historian (d. 1619)
  - Francis Godwin, English writer and bishop (d. 1633)
  - George Gordon, 1st Marquess of Huntly, Scottish noble (d. 1636)
  - Natsuka Masaie, Japanese daimyō (noble) (d. 1600)
  - Paulo Miki, Japanese Catholic saint and martyr (d. 1597)
  - Richard Neile, English bishop (d. 1640)
  - Henry Spelman, English antiquary (d. 1641)
  - Cornelis van Haarlem, Dutch painter (d. 1638)

1563

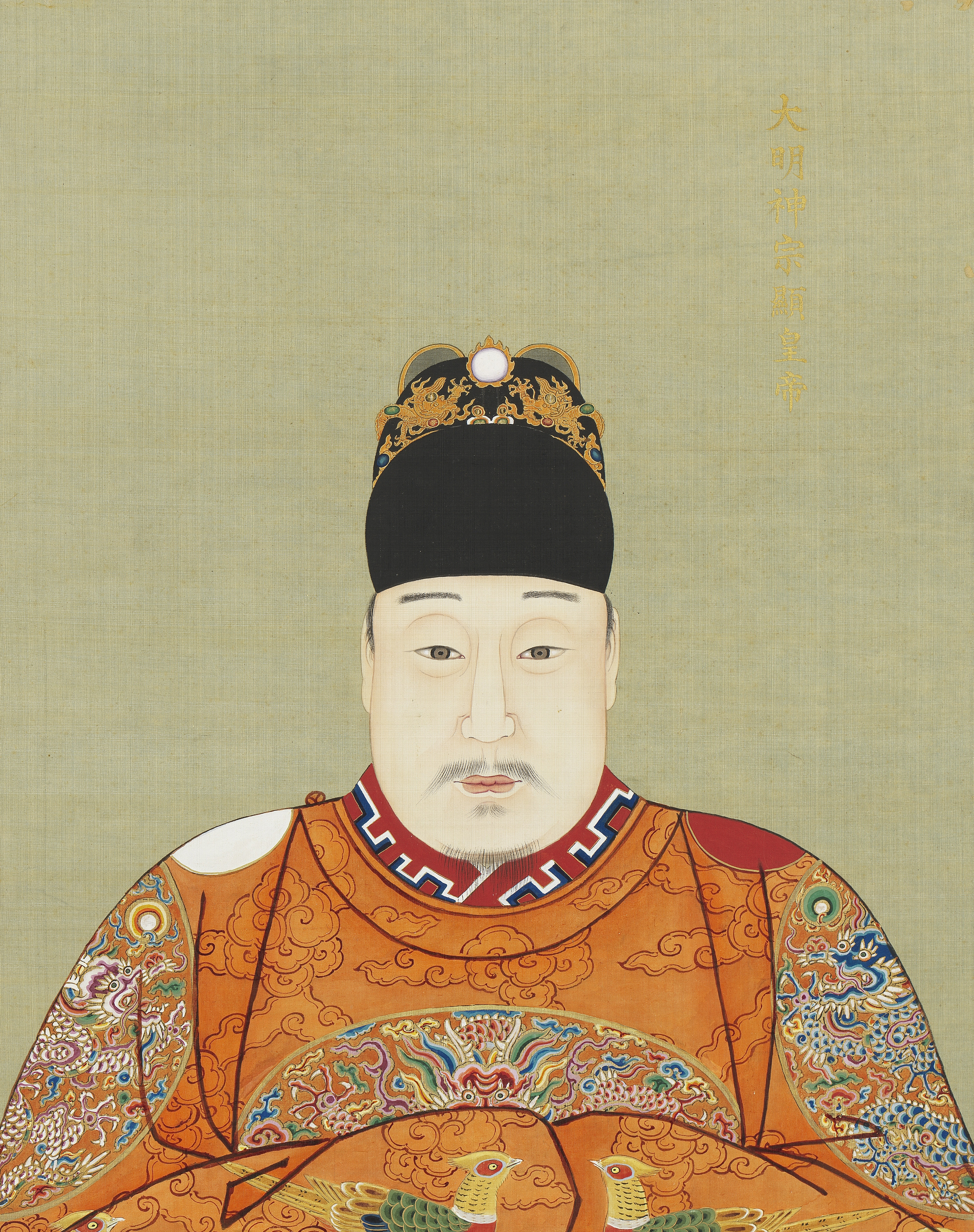
Emperor Wanli

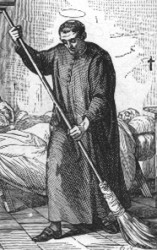
Saint Francis Caracciolo

- January – Penelope Blount, Countess of Devonshire, English noblewoman (d. 1607)
- January 6
  - Johann Christoph von Westerstetten, German bishop (d. 1637)
  - Martin Becanus, Belgian Jesuit priest (d. 1624)
- January 19 – Leonhard Hutter, German theologian (d. 1616)
- January 29 – William Slingsby, English army officer (d. 1634)
- January 30 – Franciscus Gomarus, Dutch theologian (d. 1641)
- March 5 – John Coke, English politician (d. 1644)
- March 29 – Sir Miles Sandys, 1st Baronet, English politician (d. 1645)
- April 15 – Guru Arjan Dev, fifth Sikh leader (d. 1606)
- May 9 – Frederick IV of Fürstenberg, German noble (d. 1617)
- June 1 – Robert Cecil, 1st Earl of Salisbury, English statesman and spymaster (d. 1612)
- June 4 – George Heriot, Scottish goldsmith and philanthropist (d. 1624)
- July 19 – Lamoral, 1st Prince of Ligne (d. 1624)
- September 4 – Wanli Emperor of China (d. 1620)
- September 15 – Elisabeth of Anhalt-Zerbst, Electress of Brandenburg (d. 1607)
- September 18 – Agnes of Limburg-Styrum, Abbess of Elten, Vreden, Borghorst and Freckenhorst (d. 1645)
- September 27 – Thomas Freke, English politician (d. 1633)
- September 30 – Enno III, Count of East Frisia, Count of Ostfriesland from 1599 to 1625 from the Cirksena family (d. 1625)
- October 4 – Dorothea of Saxony, Duchess of Brunswick-Wolfenbüttel (d. 1587)
- October 13 – Francis Caracciolo, Italian Catholic priest (d. 1608)
- October 14 – Jodocus Hondius, Flemish artist (d. 1633)
- October 28 – Berlinghiero Gessi, Italian Catholic cardinal (d. 1639)
- October 30 – Sophie of Brunswick-Lüneburg, Margrave of Brandenburg-Ansbach and Brandenburg-Kulmbach, Duchess of Hunters Village (d. 1639)
- November 5 – Countess Anna of Nassau (d. 1588)
- November 8 – Henry II, Duke of Lorraine (d. 1624)
- November 19 – Robert Sidney, 1st Earl of Leicester, English statesman (d. 1626)
- November 20 – Sophie of Württemberg, German noble (d. 1590)
- November 28 – Hosokawa Tadaoki, Japanese daimyō (d. 1646)
- December 2 – Mutio Vitelleschi, Italian Superior General of the Society of Jesus (d. 1645)
- December 19 – Lord William Howard, English nobleman (d. 1640)
- December 20 – Juan Fernandez Pacheco, 5th Duke of Escalona, Spanish noble and diplomat (d. 1615)
- date unknown
  - Charles Blount, 1st Earl of Devonshire (d. 1606)
  - Louise Bourgeois Boursier, French Royal midwife (d. 1636)
  - John Dowland, English composer (d. 1626)
  - Michael Drayton, English poet (d. 1631)
  - Scipione Gentili, Italian legal scholar (d. 1616)
  - Anna Guarini, Italian virtuoso singer (d. 1598)
  - Hosokawa Gracia, Japanese noblewoman (d. 1600)
  - Heo Nanseolheon, Korean poet (d. 1589)
  - Marcin Kazanowski, Polish nobleman (d. 1636)
  - Zygmunt Kazanowski, Polish nobleman (d. 1634)
  - Robert Naunton, English politician and writer (d. 1635)
  - Pedro Fernandes de Queirós, Portuguese seaman and explorer (d. 1614)
  - Mariana de Jesús Torres, Spanish nun and mystic (d. 1635)
  - Joshua Sylvester, English poet (d. 1618)
  - Jean Titelouze, French organist and composer (d. 1633)
  - Yi Su-gwang, Korean scholar (d. 1628)
  - Henri, Duke of Joyeuse, French general (d. 1608)

1564

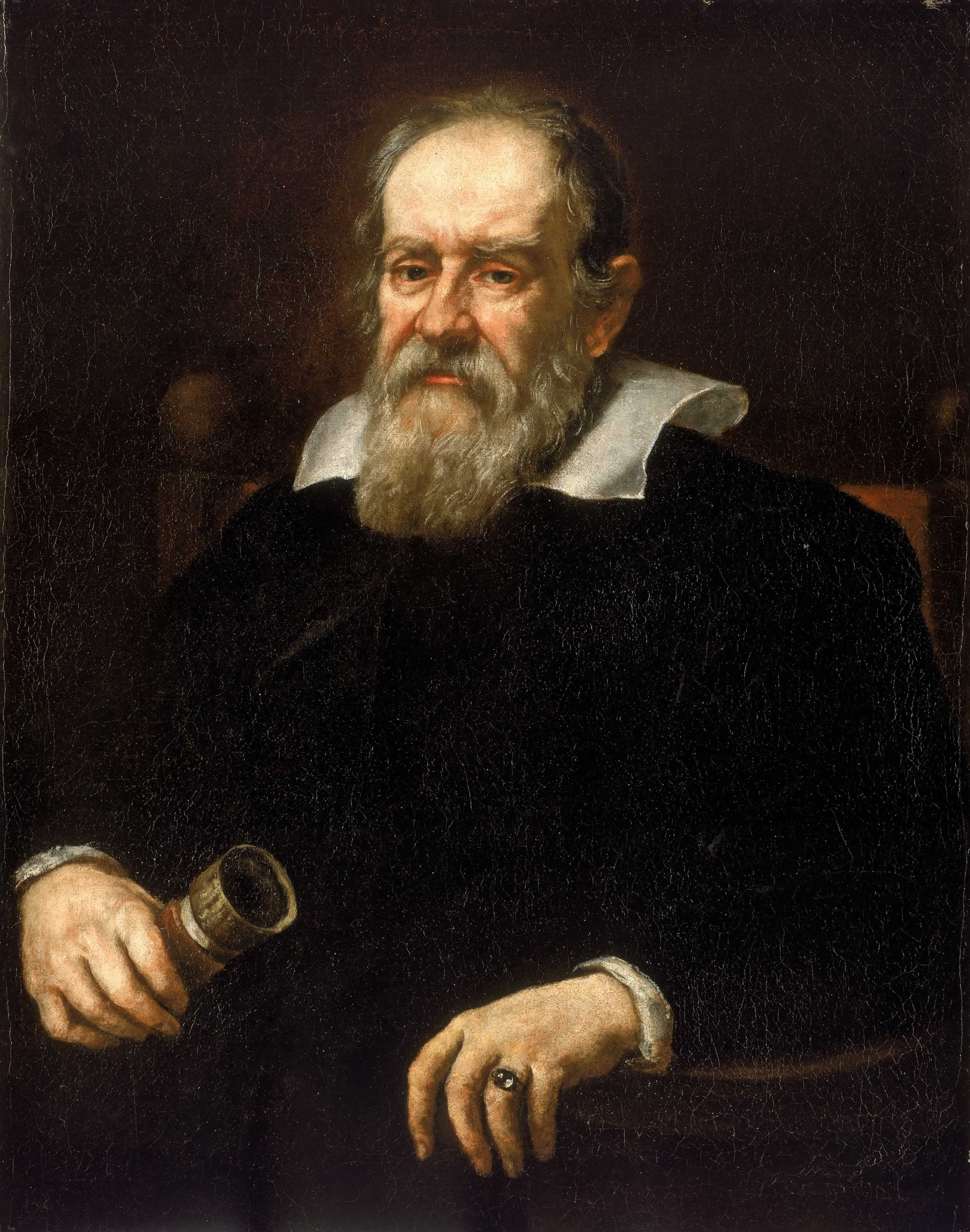
Galileo Galilei

William Shakespeare

- January 1 – Šurhaci, Chinese prince (d. 1611)
- February 15 – Galileo Galilei, Italian astronomer and physicist (d. 1642)
- February 26 (baptized) – Christopher Marlowe, English dramatist and poet (d. 1593)
- March 7 – Pierre Coton, French Jesuit and royal confessor (d. 1626)
- March 9 – David Fabricius, Frisian astronomer (d. 1617)
- March 15 – William Augustus, Duke of Brunswick-Harburg (d. 1642)
- March 20 – Thomas Morton, English bishop (d. 1659)
- April – Henry Percy, 9th Earl of Northumberland (d. 1632)
- April 2 – William Bathe, Irish Jesuit priest (d. 1614)
- April 26 (baptized) – William Shakespeare, English dramatist and poet (d. 1616)
- April 30 – Francis Hay, 9th Earl of Erroll, Scottish noble (d. 1631)
- May 27 – Margherita Gonzaga, Duchess of Ferrara, Italian noble, patron of the arts (d. 1618)
- June 11 – Joseph Heintz the Elder, Swiss artist (d. 1609)
- June 12 – John Casimir, Duke of Saxe-Coburg (d. 1633)
- June 28 – Cort Aslakssøn, Norwegian astronomer (d. 1624)
- July 6 – Johanna Sibylla of Hanau-Lichtenberg, Countess consort of Wied-Runkel and Isenburg (d. 1636)
- August 18 – Federico Borromeo, Cardinal Archbishop of Milan (d. 1631)
- August 24 – Patrick Forbes, bishop in the Church of Scotland (d. 1635)
- September 13 – Vincenzo Giustiniani, Italian banker and art collector (d. 1637)
- September 24 – William Adams, English navigator and samurai (d. 1620)
- September 25 – Magnus Brahe, Swedish noble (d. 1633)
- September 28 – Sibylla of Anhalt, Duchess consort of Württemberg (1593-1608) (d. 1614)
- October 15 – Henry Julius, Duke of Brunswick-Lüneburg (1589-1613) (d. 1613)
- October 26 – Hans Leo Hassler, German composer and organist (d. 1612)
- November 3 (baptized) – Francisco Pacheco, Spanish artist (d. 1644)
- November 22 – Henry Brooke, 11th Baron Cobham, English peer and traitor (d. 1618)
- November 24 – Joseph Gaultier de la Vallette, French astronomer (d. 1647)
- December 25
  - Johannes Buxtorf, German Calvinist theologian (d. 1629)
  - Nicolaus Mulerius, Dutch astronomer and medical academic (d. 1630)
- December 31 – Ernest II, Duke of Brunswick-Lüneburg, German ruler (d. 1611)
- approximate date – Xue Susu, Chinese artist
- date unknown
  - Pieter Brueghel the Younger, Flemish painter (d. 1638)
  - Daniel Chamier, French minister of religion (d. 1621)
  - Kryštof Harant z Polžic a Bezdružic, Bohemian composer and Protestant rebel (d. 1621)
  - Pedro Páez, Spanish Jesuit missionary to Ethiopia (d. 1622)
  - Thomas Shirley, English privateer (d. c.1634)

1565

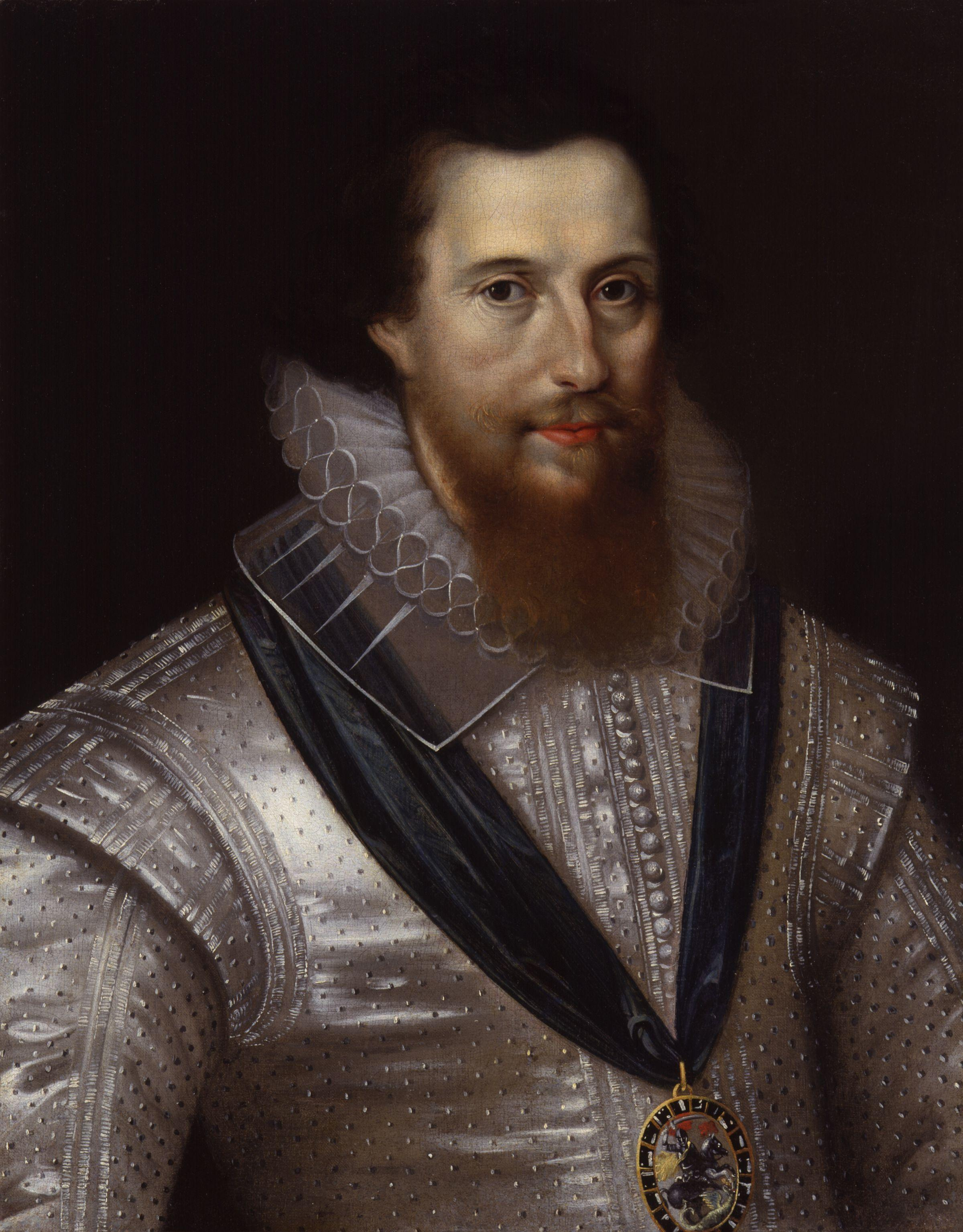
Robert Devereux, 2nd Earl of Essex

- January 17 – Mariana Navarro de Guevarra Romero, Spanish Roman Catholic nun, member of the Mercedarian Tertiaries (d. 1624)
- February 13 – Willem Baudartius, Dutch theologian (d. 1640)
- March 23 – Eilhard Lubinus, German theologian (d. 1621)
- April 2 – Cornelis de Houtman, Dutch explorer (d. 1599)
- April 3 – Anna III, Abbess of Quedlinburg (d. 1601)
- May 15 – Hendrick de Keyser, Dutch sculptor and architect born in Utrecht (d. 1621)
- June 2 – Francisco Ribalta, Spanish painter (d. 1628)
- June 14 – Francis Tanfield, English governor of the South Falkland colony
- July 6 – Hugh Hamersley, Lord Mayor of London, 1627–1628 (d. 1636)
- August 5 – Paola Massarenghi, Italian composer (d. unknown)
- August 9 – Louis II, Count of Nassau-Weilburg (d. 1627)
- August 16 – Christina, Grand Duchess of Tuscany (d. 1637)
- August 20 – Margaretha van Valckenburch, Dutch shipowner, only female member of the VOC (d. 1650)
- August 29 – Agostino Ciampelli, Italian painter (d. 1630)
- September 17 – Edward Fortunatus, German nobleman (d. 1600)
- September 28 – Alessandro Tassoni, Italian poet and writer (d. 1635)
- October 6 – Marie de Gournay, French writer (d. 1645)
- October 12 – Ippolito Galantini, Italian founder of the Congregation of Christian Doctrine of Florence (d. 1619)
- October 22 – Benedikt Carpzov the elder, German legal scholar (d. 1624)
- November 10
  - Robert Devereux, 2nd Earl of Essex, English nobleman and politician (d. 1601)
  - Laurentius Paulinus Gothus, Swedish theologian and astronomer (d. 1646)
- November 14 – Petrus Bertius, Flemish theologian and scientist (d. 1629)
- December 2 – Toby Caulfeild, 1st Baron Caulfeild, Northern Irish politician (d. 1627)
- date unknown
  - Reza Abbasi, Persian painter and calligrapher (d. 1635)
  - Gregor Aichinger, German composer (d. 1628)
  - John Davies of Hereford, Welsh poet (d. 1618)
  - Camillo Graffico, Italian engraver (d. 1615)
  - George Kirbye, English composer (d. 1634)
  - Francis Meres, English churchman and author (d. 1647)
  - María Pita, Spanish heroine (d. 1643)
  - John Spottiswoode, Archbishop of St. Andrews (d. 1639)
  - Edmund Whitelocke, English soldier and courtier (d. 1608)
- probable
  - Duarte Lobo, Portuguese composer (d. 1646)

1566

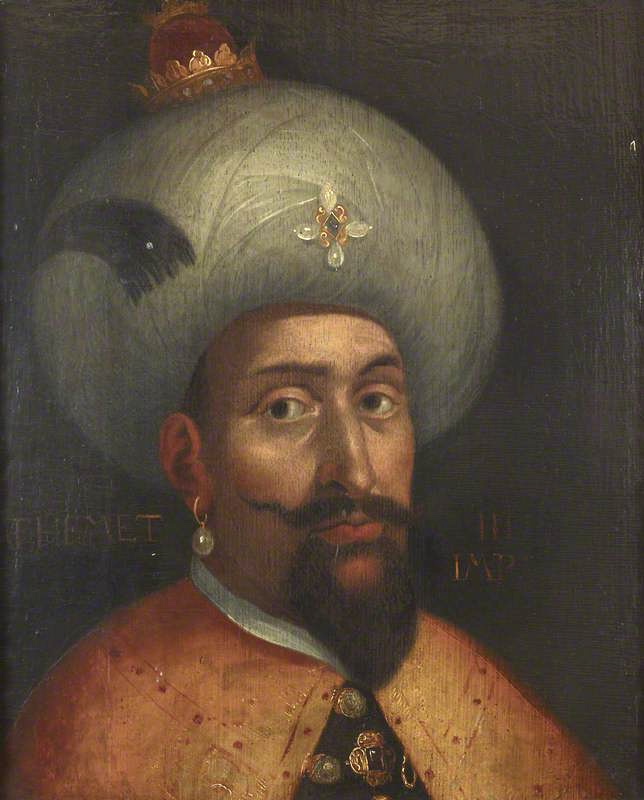
Sultan Mehmed III

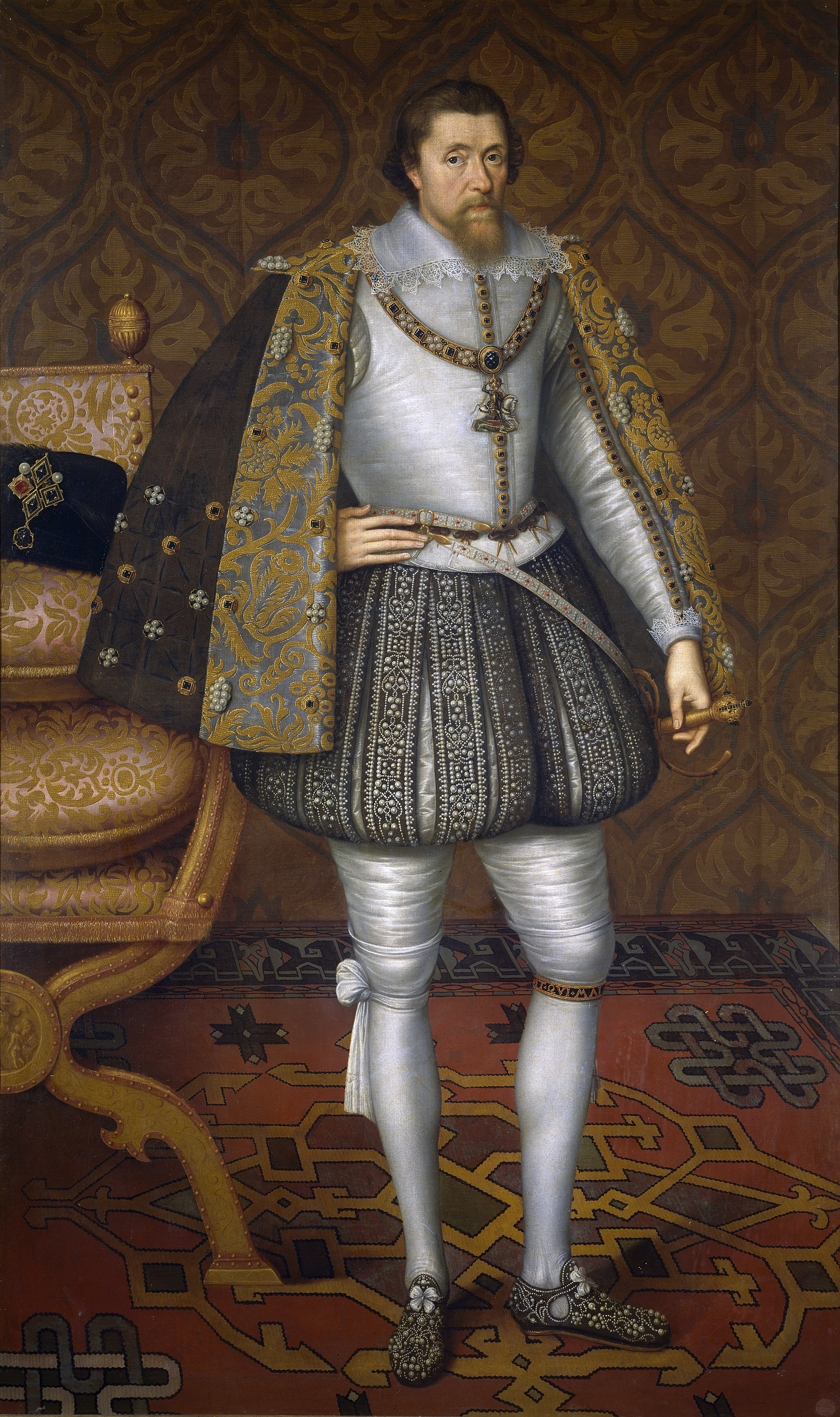
King James VI of Scotland/James I of England and Ireland

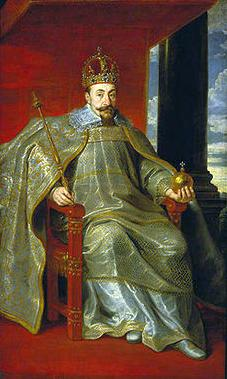
King Sigismund III Vasa

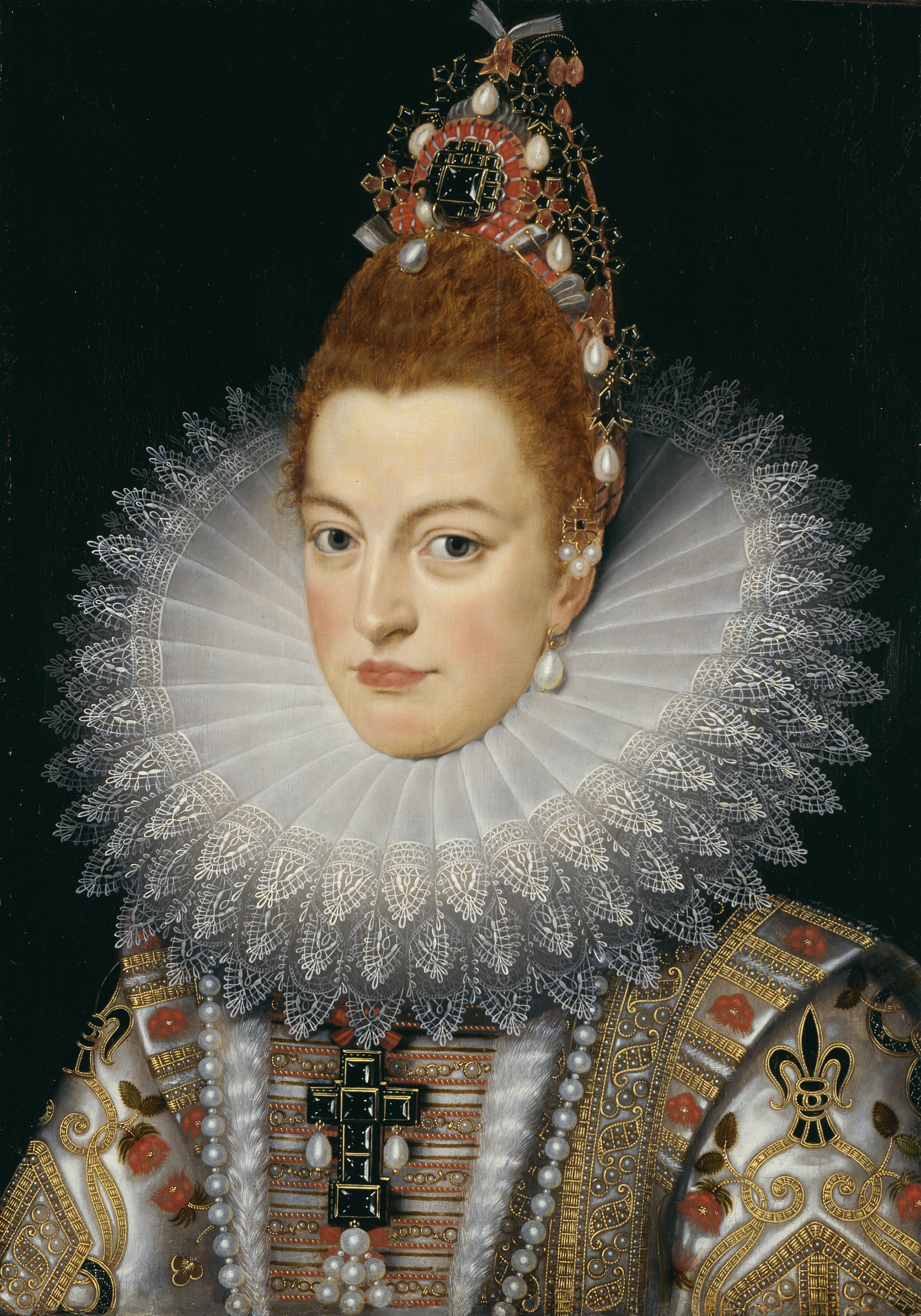
Infanta Isabella Clara Eugenia of Spain

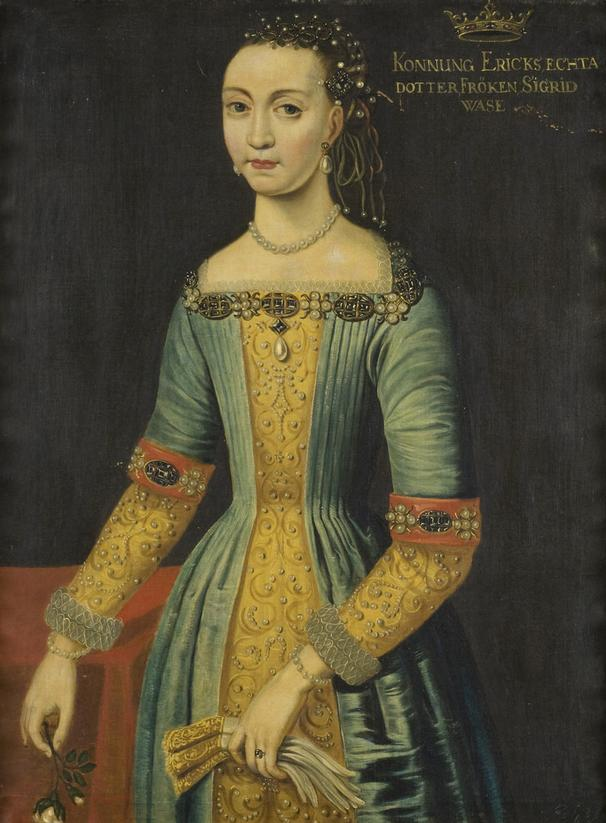
Sigrid of Sweden

- January 13 – Maria of Brunswick-Lüneburg, Duchess Consort of Saxe-Lauenburg (1582–1619) (d. 1626)
- January 15 – Philipp Uffenbach, German artist (d. 1636)
- January 17 – Anna Juliana Gonzaga, Archduchess of Austria and nun (d. 1621)
- February 1 – Marie of the Incarnation, French Discalced Carmelite beatified nun and blessed (d. 1618)
- February 2 – Michal Sedziwój, Polish alchemist (d. 1636)
- February 18 – Francesco Erizzo, Doge of Venice (d. 1646)
- March 1 – John Hoskins, English poet (d. 1638)
- March 8 – Carlo Gesualdo, Italian music composer (d. 1613)
- April 2 – Bartholda van Swieten, Dutch diplomat (d. 1647)
- May 26 – Mehmed III, Ottoman Sultan (d. 1603)
- June 19 – King James VI of Scotland/James I of England and Ireland (d. 1625)
- June 20 – King Sigismund III Vasa, of Poland and Sweden (d. 1632)
- July 9 – John Ernest, Duke of Saxe-Eisenach, German duke (d. 1638)
- August 12 – Infanta Isabella Clara Eugenia of Spain (d. 1633)
- August 24 – Abraham Scultetus, German theologian (d. 1625)
- September 1 – Edward Alleyn, English actor (d. 1626)
- October 13 – Richard Boyle, 1st Earl of Cork, Irish politician (d. 1643)
- October 15 – Sigrid of Sweden, Swedish princess (d. 1633)
- November 3 – Charles, Count of Soissons, French prince du sang and military commander (d. 1612)
- November 9 – Christian, Duke of Brunswick-Lüneburg, Prince of Lüneburt (1611–1633) (d. 1633)
- November 21 – Francesco Cennini de' Salamandri, Roman Catholic cardinal (d. 1645)
- November 25 – John Heminges, English actor (d. 1630)
- November 26 – Francesco Bracciolini, Italian poet (d. 1645)
- December 1 – Philip of Nassau, Count of Nassau (d. 1595)
- December 11 – (baptised) – Manuel Cardoso, Portuguese composer (d. 1650)
- December 19 – George Talbot, 9th Earl of Shrewsbury, English earl (d. 1630)
- December 27 – Jan Jesenius, Slovak physician (d. 1621)
- date unknown
  - Pietro Cerone, Italian music theorist (d. 1625)
  - Polyxena von Lobkowicz, politically active Czech aristocrat (d. 1642)
  - Giovanni Baglione, Italian painter and historian of art (d. 1643)
  - Lucia Quinciani, Italian composer
  - James Sempill, Scottish theologian (d. 1626)
  - Caterina Vitale, Maltese pharmacist (d. 1619)

1567

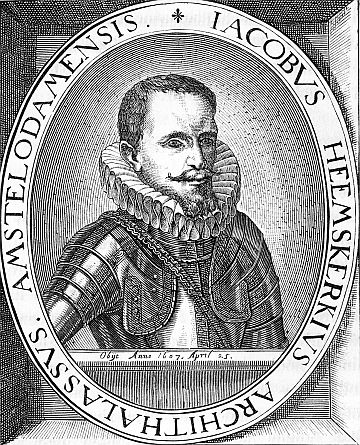
Jacob van Heemskerk

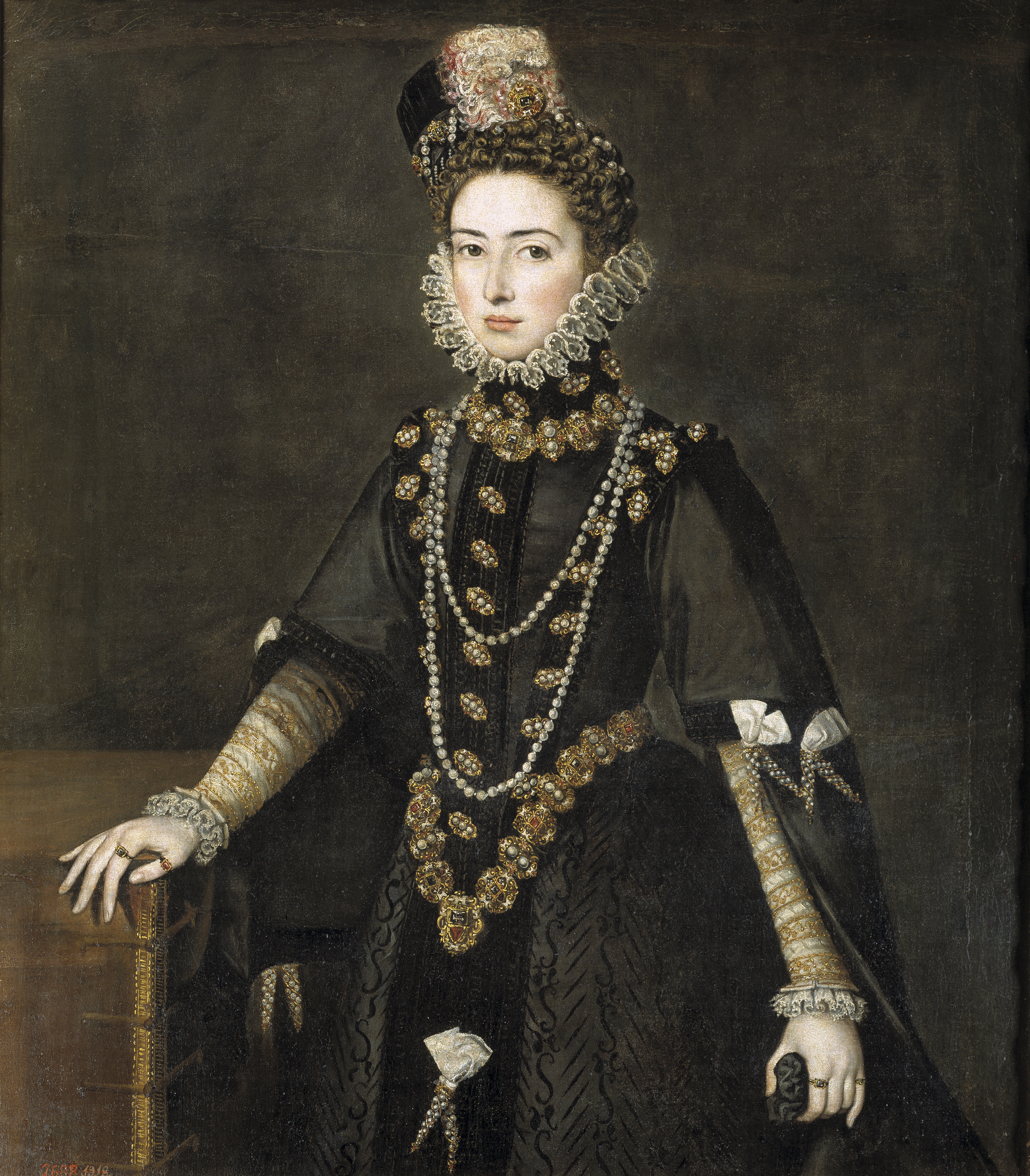
Infanta Catherine Michelle of Spain

- January 1 – Fabio Colonna, Italian scientist (d. 1640)
- January 4 – François d'Aguilon, Belgian Jesuit mathematician (d. 1617)
- January 25 – Archduchess Margaret of Austria (d. 1633)
- January 27 – Anna Maria of Hesse-Kassel, Countess Consort of Nassau-Saarbrücke (d. 1626)
- February 3 – Anna Maria of Brandenburg, Duchess Consort of Pomerania (d. 1618)
- February 12 – Thomas Campion, English poet and composer (d. 1620)
- February 23 – Elisabeth of Brunswick-Wolfenbüttel, Countess of Holstein-Schauenburg and Duchess Consort of Brunswick-Harburg (d. 1618)
- February 24 – Jindřich Matyáš Thurn, Swedish general (d. 1640)
- March 13 (bapt.) – Jacob van Heemskerk, Dutch admiral and explorer (d. 1607)
- March 17 – Akizuki Tanenaga, Japanese samurai and soldier (d. 1614)
- April 10 – John Louis I, Count of Nassau-Wiesbaden-Idstein, Germany noble (d. 1596)
- April 26 – Nicolas Formé, French composer (d. 1638)
- May 2 – Sebald de Weert, Dutch captain, vice-admiral of the Dutch East India Company (d. 1603)
- May 9 – John George I, Prince of Anhalt-Dessau (1603–1618) (d. 1618)
- May 13 – Don Giovanni de' Medici, Italian military commander and diplomat (d. 1621)
- May 15 – Claudio Monteverdi, Italian composer (d. 1643)
- June 25 – Jacob Ulfeldt, Danish politician (d. 1630)
- August 14 – Luigi Caponaro, Italian healer (d. 1622)
- August 15 – Philip III, Margrave of Baden-Rodemachern (1588–1620) (d. 1620)
- August 21 – Francis de Sales, Savoyard Bishop of Geneva and saint (d. 1622)
- September – Edward Sutton, 5th Baron Dudley, English landowner (d. 1643)
- September 2 – György Thurzó, Palatine of Hungary (d. 1616)
- September 5 – Date Masamune, Japanese daimyō (d. 1636)
- September 24 – Martin Fréminet, French painter (d. 1619)
- October 10 – Infanta Catherine Michelle of Spain (d. 1597)
- November
  - Thomas Nashe, English poet (d. 1600)
  - Minye Kyawswa II of Ava, last crown prince of the Toungoo Empire (Burma) (d. 1599)
- November 1 – Diego Sarmiento de Acuña, 1st Count of Gondomar, Spanish diplomat (d. 1626)
- November 7 – Margherita Farnese, Benedictine nun (d. 1643)
- November 14 – Maurice of Nassau, Prince of Orange (d. 1625)
- November 16 – Anna of Saxony, German noblewoman (d. 1613)
- November 21 – Anne de Xainctonge, French religious (d. 1621)
- December 15 – Christoph Demantius, German composer (d. 1643)
- December 18
  - Cornelius a Lapide, Jesuit exegete (d. 1637)
  - Tachibana Muneshige, Japanese samurai and soldier (d. 1643)
- date unknown
  - Isabel Barreto, Spanish admiral (d. 1612)
  - Pierre Biard, French settler and Jesuit missionary (d. 1622)
  - Adriaen Block, Dutch fur trader and navigator (d. 1624)
  - Jacques Clément, French assassin of Henry III of France (d. 1589)
  - Arima Harunobu, Japanese Christian daimyō (d. 1612)
  - John Parkinson, English herbalist and botanist (d. 1650)
  - Willem Schouten, Dutch navigator (d. 1625)
  - Torii Tadamasa, Japanese nobleman (d. 1628)
  - Sanada Yukimura, Japanese samurai and soldier (d. 1615)
  - Ban Naoyuki, Japanese samurai and soldier (d. 1615)

1568

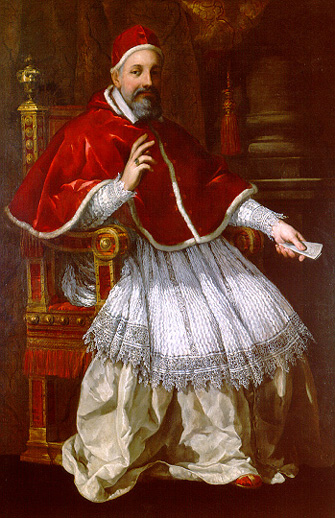
Pope Urban VIII

- January 6 – Henri Spondanus, French historian (d. 1643)
- January 14 – Johannes Hartmann, German chemist (d. 1631)
- January 20 – Daniel Cramer, German theologian (d. 1637)
- January 28 – Gustav of Sweden, Swedish prince (d. 1607)
- January 30 – Katharina of Hanau-Lichtenberg, countess (d. 1636)
- February 2 – Péter Révay, Hungarian historian (d. 1622)
- February 11 – Honoré d'Urfé, French writer (d. 1625)
- March 9 – Aloysius Gonzaga, Italian Jesuit and saint (d. 1591)
- March 16 – Juan Martínez Montañés, Spanish sculptor (d. 1649)
- March 28 – Johannes Polyander, Dutch theologian (d. 1646)
- March 30 – Henry Wotton, English author and diplomat (d. 1639)
- April 5 – Pope Urban VIII (d. 1644)
- April 17 – George Brooke, English aristocrat (d. 1603)
- April 21 – Frederick II, Duke of Holstein-Gottorp (d. 1587)
- April 28 – Teodósio II, Duke of Braganza, Portuguese nobleman and father of João IV of Portugal (d. 1630)
- May 9 – Guglielmo Caccia, Italian painter (d. 1625)
- May 11 – Christian I, Prince of Anhalt-Bernburg, German prince of the House of Ascania (d. 1630)
- May 17 – Anna Vasa of Sweden, Swedish princess (d. 1625)
- May 29 – Virginia de' Medici, Duchess of Modena and Reggio (d. 1615)
- June 6 – Sophie of Brandenburg, Regent of Saxony (1591–1601) (d. 1622)
- June 25 – Gunilla Bielke, Queen of Sweden (d. 1597)
- July 1 – Philip Sigismund of Brunswick-Wolfenbüttel, German Catholic bishop (d. 1623)
- August 27 – Hercule, Duke of Montbazon (d. 1654)
- September 3 – Adriano Banchieri, Italian composer (d. 1634)
- September 5 – Tommaso Campanella, Italian theologian and poet (d. 1639)
- October 2 – Marino Ghetaldi, Croatian mathematician and physicist (d. 1626)
- October 18 – Henry Wallop, English politician (d. 1642)
- November 18 – Augustus the Elder, Duke of Brunswick-Lüneburg, Lutheran Bishop of Ratzeburg (d. 1636)
- December 17 – Jonathan Trelawny, English politician (d. 1604)
- date unknown
  - Nikolaus Ager, French botanist (d. 1634)
  - John Welsh of Ayr, Scottish Presbyterian leader
  - Edward Chichester, 1st Viscount Chichester (d. 1648)
  - Nakagawa Hidemasa, Japanese military leader (d. 1592)
  - Fernando de Alva Cortés Ixtlilxóchitl, Mexican historian (d. 1648)
  - Gervase Markham, English poet and writer (d. 1637)
  - Robert Wintour, English conspirator (executed 1606)
  - Wei Zhongxian, Grand Secretary of China (d. 1627)
  - Ōtsu Ono, Japanese woman poet, koto, and writer (believed to have learned how to write from Nobutada Konoe) (d. 1631)

1569

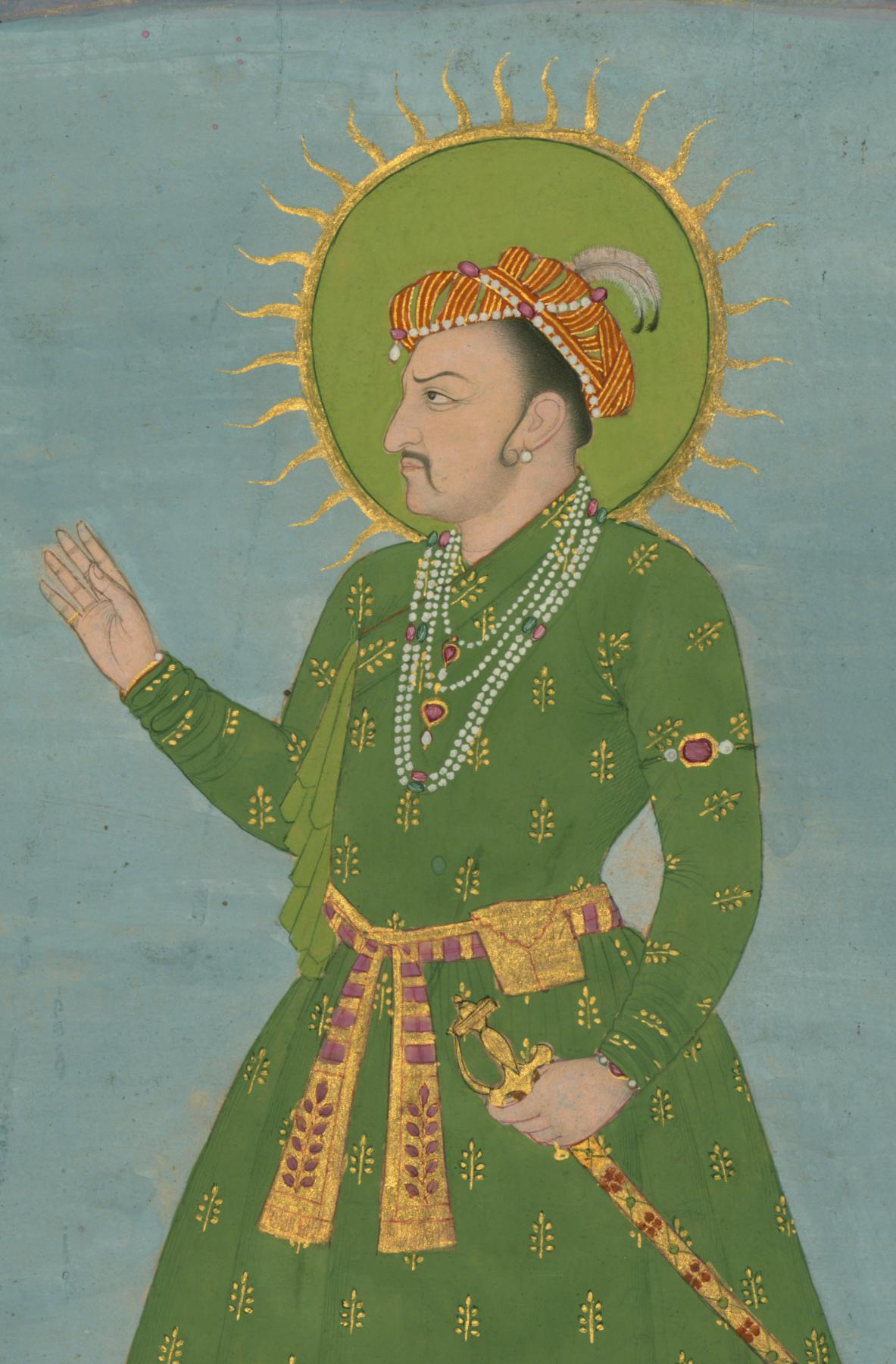
Jahangir

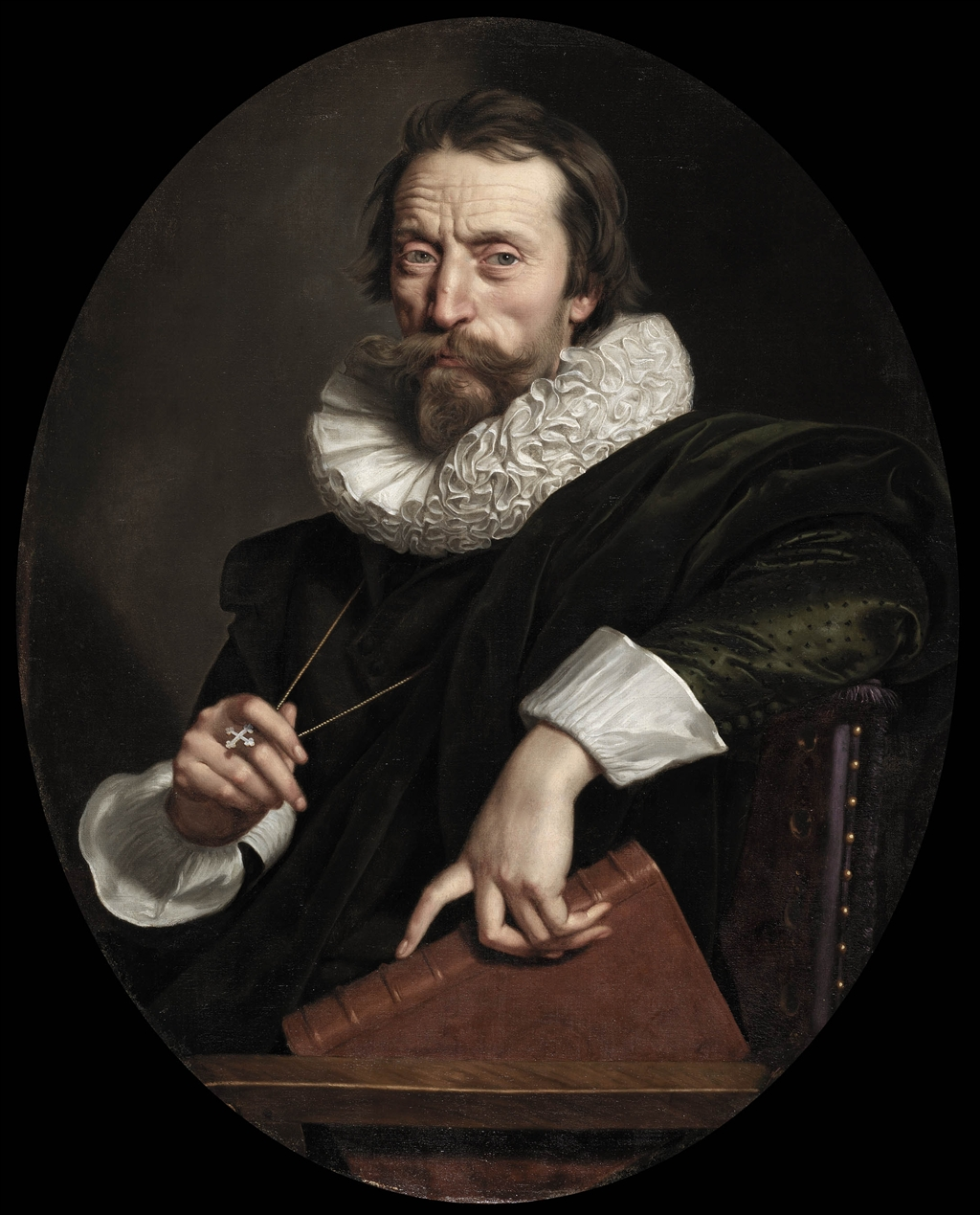
Giambattista Marino

- January 20 – Heribert Rosweyde, Jesuit hagiographer (d. 1629)
- January 22 – Lucio Massari, Italian painter (d. 1633)
- February 13 – Johann Reinhard I, Count of Hanau-Lichtenberg (d. 1625)
- March 28 – Ranuccio I Farnese, Duke of Parma (d. 1622)
- March 29 – John Suckling, English politician (d. 1627)
- April 10 – Countess Emilia of Nassau, German countess (d. 1629)
- April 15 – Joan Shakespeare, William Shakespeare's sister (d. 1646)
- April 16 – John Davies, English poet and lawyer (d. 1626)
- May 20 – Juan de la Cerda, 6th Duke of Medinaceli, Spanish noble (d. 1607)
- June 1 – Sophia of Holstein-Gottorp, Regent of Mecklenburg-Schwerin (1603–1608) (d. 1634)
- June 30 – Hedwig of Hesse-Kassel, countess consort of Schaumburg (d. 1644)
- July 3 – Thomas Richardson, English politician and judge (d. 1635)
- July 19 – Conrad Vorstius, Dutch theologian (d. 1622)
- July 30 – Karl I, Prince of Liechtenstein (d. 1627)
- August 31 – Jahangir, Mughal emperor (d. 1627)
- September – Arthur Lake, English bishop, a translator of the King James Bible (d. 1626)
- September 5 – Georg Friedrich of Hohenlohe-Neuenstein-Weikersheim, officer and amateur poet (d. 1645)
- September 9 – Joachim Andreas von Schlick, Czech leader (d. 1621)
- September 23 – Tachibana Ginchiyo, female samurai leader of the Tachibana clan in Japan (d. 1602)
- September 24 – Ernst of Schaumburg, Count of Holstein-Pinneberg and Schaumburg (1601–1622) (d. 1622)
- September 27 – John Percy, English priest (d. 1641)
- October 13 – Claude de Bullion, French Minister of Finance (d. 1640)
- October 14 – Giambattista Marino, Italian poet (d. 1625)
- November 5 – Nils Turesson Bielke, Swedish politician (d. 1639)
- November 11 – Martin Ruland the Younger, German alchemist (d. 1611)
- November 16 – Paul Sartorius, German composer (d. 1609)
- November 18 – Antonio Marcello Barberini, Italian cardinal and the younger brother of Maffeo Barberini (d. 1646)
- November 24 – Francis Ashley, English politician (d. 1635)
- December 15 – Muzio Oddi, Italian mathematician (d. 1639)
- December 18 – Jakob Hassler, German composer (d. 1622)
- December 22 – Étienne Martellange, French architect (d. 1641)
- December 31 – Anna de' Medici, Tuscan princess (d. 1584)
- date unknown
  - Guillén de Castro y Bellvis, Spanish dramatist (d. 1631)
  - William Monson, British admiral (d. 1643)
  - Frans Pourbus the Younger, Flemish painter (d. 1622)
  - Yodo-dono, Japanese concubine of Toyotomi Hideyoshi (d. 1615)

== Deaths ==
1560

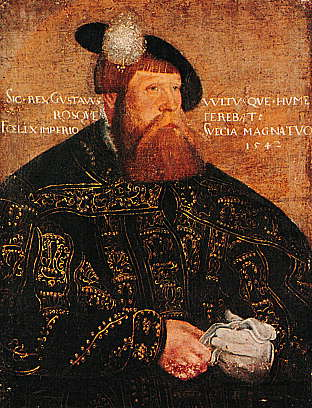
King Gustavus I of Sweden

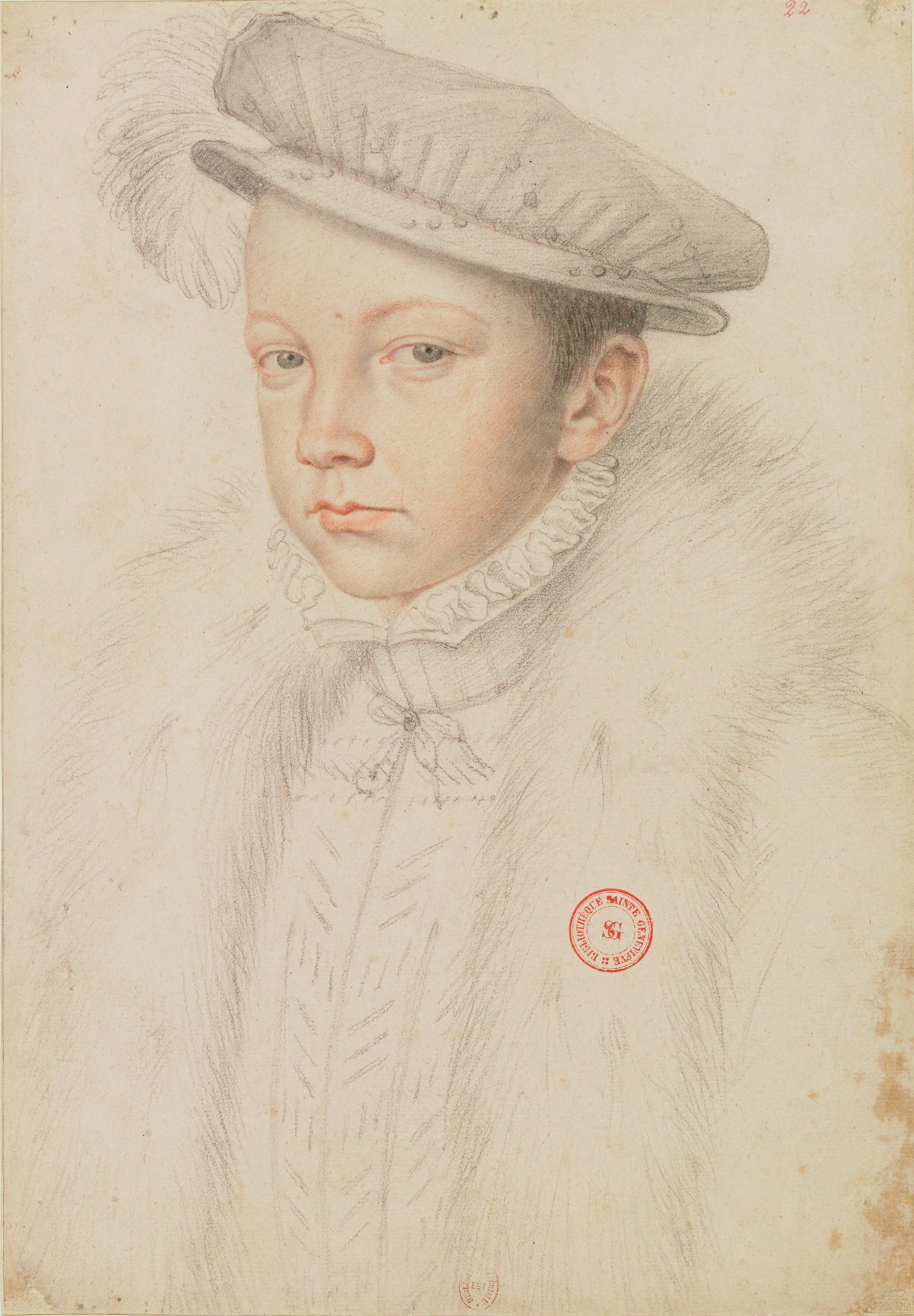
King Francis II of France

- January 1 – Joachim du Bellay, French poet (b. 1522)
- January 8 – Jan Łaski, Polish Protestant evangelical reformer (b. 1499)
- January 22 – Wang Zhi, Chinese pirate
- February 7 – Bartolommeo Bandinelli, Florentine sculptor (b. 1493)
- February 14 – Philip I, Duke of Pomerania-Wolgast (b. 1515)
- February 16 – Jean du Bellay, French cardinal and diplomat (b. 1493)
- March 5 – Pedro Pacheco de Villena, Spanish Catholic cardinal (b. 1488)
- April 19 – Philip Melanchthon, German humanist and reformer (b. 1497)
- June 11 – Mary of Guise, queen of James V of Scotland and regent (b. 1515)
- June 12
  - Imagawa Yoshimoto, Japanese daimyō (b. 1519)
  - Ii Naomori, Japanese warrior (b. 1506)
- August 4 – Maeda Toshimasa, Japanese samurai
- August 7 – Anastasia Romanovna, Tsarina of Russia, married to Russian Tsar Ivan the Terrible (b. 1530)
- September 8 – Amy Robsart, English noblewoman (b. 1532)
- September 14 – Anton Fugger, German merchant (b. 1493)
- September 29 – King Gustav I of Sweden (b. 1496)
- September 30 – Melchor Cano, Spanish theologian (b. 1525)
- November 7 – Petrus Lotichius Secundus, German Neo-Latin poet (b. 1528)
- November 25 – Andrea Doria, Italian naval commander (b. 1466)
- December 2 – Georg Sabinus, German writer (b. 1508)
- December 5 – King Francis II of France (b. 1544)
- December 7 – Ernest of Bavaria, pledge lord of the County of Glatz (b. 1500)
- Date unknown – Benvenida Abrabanel, philanthropist and businesswoman.

1561

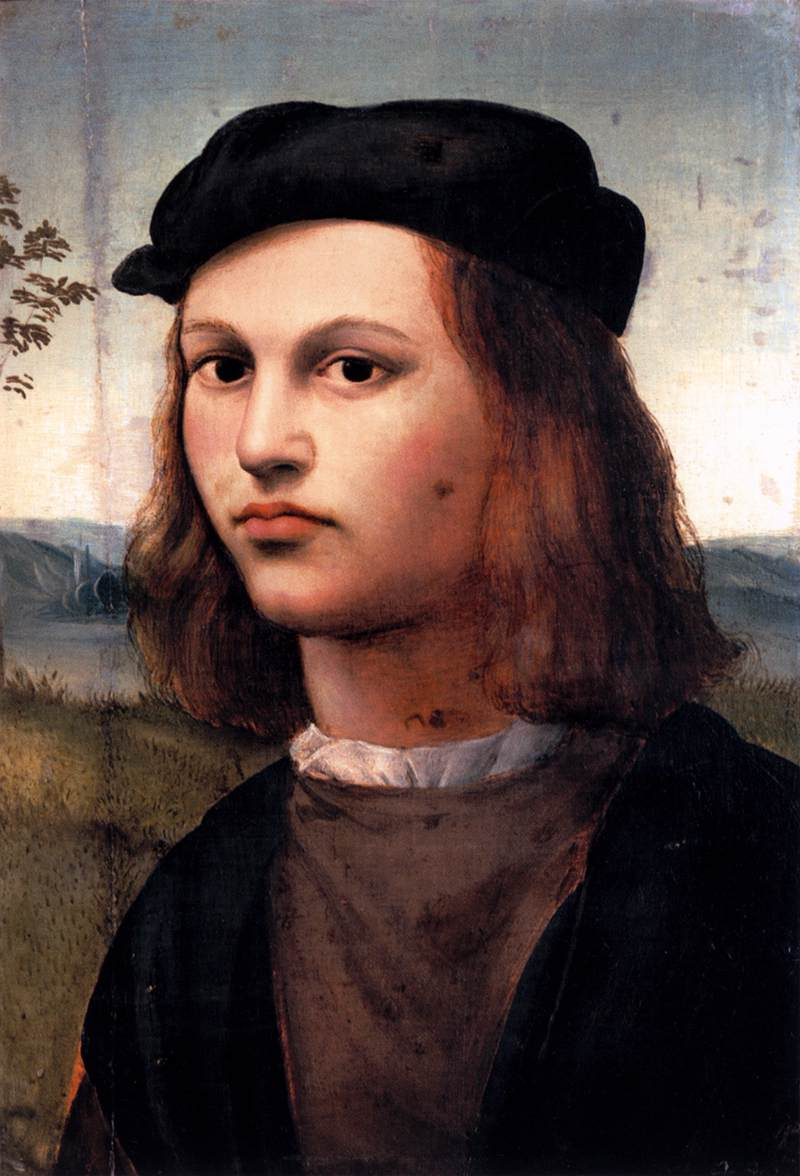
Ridolfo Ghirlandaio

- January 9 – Amago Haruhisa, Japanese samurai and warlord (b. 1514)
- January 13 – Frederick Magnus I, Count of Solms-Laubach, (b. 1521)
- January 31
  - Menno Simons, Anabaptist religious leader and Mennonite founder (b. 1496)
  - Bairam Khan, Turkoman noble and poet (assassinated)
- February 13 – Francis I, Duke of Nevers (b. 1516)
- February 26 – Jorge de Montemor, Spanish writer (b. 1520)
- March 6 – Gonçalo da Silveira, Portuguese Jesuit missionary (b. 1526)
- March 24 – Giulio d'Este, illegitimate son of Italian noble (b. 1478)
- March 25 – Conrad Lycosthenes, humanist and encyclopedist (b. 1518)
- March 28 – Bartholomeus V. Welser, German banker (b. 1484)
- April 9 – Jean Quintin, French priest, knight and writer (b. 1500)
- May 4 – Karl I, Prince of Anhalt-Zerbst, German prince (b. 1534)
- May 16 – Jan Tarnowski, Polish noble (b. 1488)
- June 23 – Saitō Yoshitatsu, Japanese daimyō (b. 1527)
- June 6 – Ridolfo Ghirlandaio, Italian painter (b. 1483)
- July 9 – Sebald Heyden, German musicologist and theologian (b. 1499)
- July 19 – Henry Lauder, Lord St Germains, Lord Advocate of Scotland
- September 1 – Edward Waldegrave, English politician and recusant
- September 25 – Sehzade Bayezid, Ottoman Prince (b. 1525)
- October 27 – Lope de Aguirre, Basque rebel and conquistador (b. 1510)
- November 7 – Jeanne de Jussie, Swiss nun and writer (b. 1503)
- November 11 – Hans Tausen, Danish reformer (b. 1494)
- December 6 – Joachim I, Prince of Anhalt-Dessau, German prince (b. 1509)
- December 10 – Caspar Schwenckfeld, German theologian
- date unknown
  - Marie Dentière, Genevan Protestant reformer and theologian (b. 1495)
  - Claude Garamond, French publisher (b. 1480)
  - Ijuin Tadaaki, Japanese noble (b. 1520)
- probable – Luis de Milán, Spanish composer (b. 1500)

1562

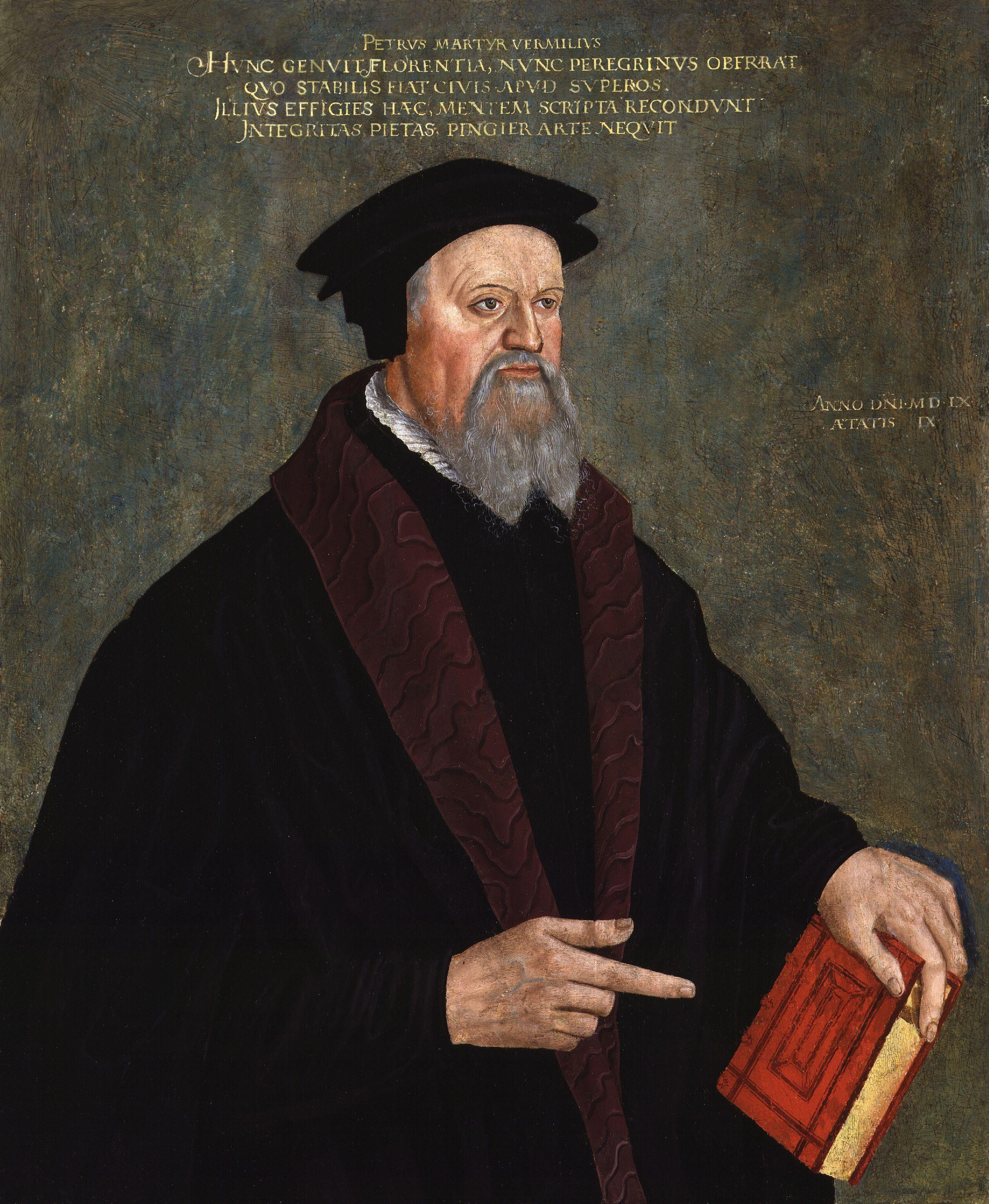
Peter Martyr Vermigli

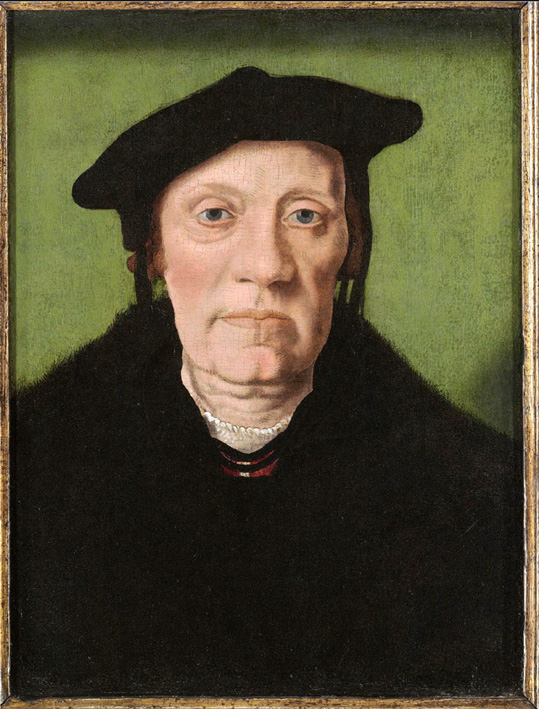
Cornelis Aerentsz van der Dussen by Jan van Scorel Panel, Weiss Gallery, London

- January – Prince Ilie II Rareş of Moldavia (b. 1531)
- January 9 – Amago Haruhisa, Japanese samurai and warlord (b. 1514)
- January 25 – Charles Wriothesley, English officer of arms (b. 1508)
- February 3 – Georg Giese, German merchant (b. 1497)
- May 4 – Lelio Sozzini, Italian Protestant theologian (b. 1525)
- July 1 – Wilhelm IV of Eberstein, German President of the Reichskammergericht (b. 1497)
- July 4 – Johann Hommel, German astronomer and mathematician (b. 1518)
- July 23 – Götz von Berlichingen, German knight and mercenary (b. 1480)
- September 5 – Katharina Zell, German Protestant reformer (b. 1497)
- October – George Gordon, 4th Earl of Huntly (b. 1514)
- October 9 – Gabriele Falloppio, Italian anatomist (b. 1523)
- October 13 – Claudin de Sermisy, French composer (b. 1495)
- October 18 – Anne d'Alençon, French noblewoman (b. 1492)
- November 7 – Maldeo Rathore, Rao of Marwar (b. 1511)
- November 12 – Pietro Martire Vermigli, Italian theologian (b. 1500)
- November 17 – Antoine de Bourbon, father of Henry IV of France (b. 1518)
- November 20 – Giovanni de' Medici, Italian Catholic cardinal (b. 1544)
- December 6
  - Jan van Scorel, Dutch painter (b. 1495)
  - Garzia de' Medici, Italian noble (b. 1547)
- December 7 – Adrian Willaert, Flemish composer (b. c. 1490)
- December 13 – Francesco Marinoni, Italian Catholic priest (b. 1490)
- December 17 – Eleonora di Toledo, Grand Duchess of Tuscany (b. 1522)
- December 27 – Joachim of Münsterberg-Oels, Duke of Münsterberg, Duke of Oels, Count of Kladsko, Bishop of Brandenburg (b. 1503)
- date unknown
  - Cristóbal de Guzmán Cecetzin, Tlatoani of Tenochtitlan and Governor of San Juan Tenochtitlan
  - Matteo Bandello, Italian novelist (b. 1480)

1563

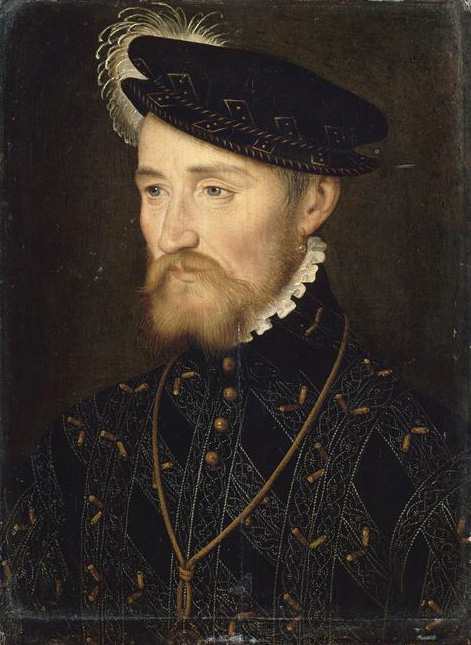
Francis, Duke of Guise

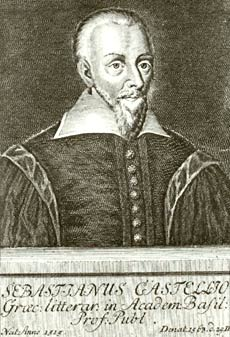
Sebastian Castellio

- January 4 – Elisabeth of Hesse, Countess Palatine of Zweibrücken, later Countess Palatine of Simmern (b. 1503)
- February 1 – Emperor Menas of Ethiopia (fever) (b. 1559)
- February 4 – Wilhelm von Brandenburg, Archbishop of Riga (b. 1498)
- February 24 – Francis, Duke of Guise, French soldier and politician (shot) (b. 1519)
- March 2 – Ercole Gonzaga, Spanish Catholic cardinal (b. 1505)
- March 17 – Girolamo Seripando, Italian Catholic cardinal (b. 1493)
- March 19 – Arthur Brooke, English poet
- March 24 – Hosokawa Harumoto, Japanese military leader (b. 1514)
- March 28 – Heinrich Glarean, Swiss music theorist (b. 1488)
- April 15 – Bernhard VIII, Count of Lippe (b. 1527)
- April 30 – Henry Stafford, 1st Baron Stafford, English baron (b. 1501)
- May 21 – Martynas Mažvydas, author of the first printed book in Lithuanian (b. 1510)
- June 10 – William Paget, 1st Baron Paget, English statesman (b. 1506)
- June 24 – Prince Yuri of Uglich (b. 1532)
- August 11 – Bartolomé de Escobedo, Spanish composer (b. 1500)
- August 18 – Étienne de La Boétie, French judge and writer (b. 1530)
- August 30 – Wolfgang Musculus, German theologian (b. 1497)
- September 17 – Henry Manners, 2nd Earl of Rutland, English soldier (b. 1526)
- October 31 – Anthony Kitchin, British bishop (b. 1471)
- November
  - John Bale, English churchman (b. 1495)
  - Ioan Iacob Heraclid, ruler of Moldavia (b. 1511)
- December 1 – Yi Gwang-sik, Korean politician and general (b. 1493)
- December 29
  - Sebastian Castellio, French theologian (b. 1515)
  - Thomas Naogeorgus, German playwright (b. 1508)
- date unknown
  - Odet de Selve, French diplomat (b. c. 1504)

1564

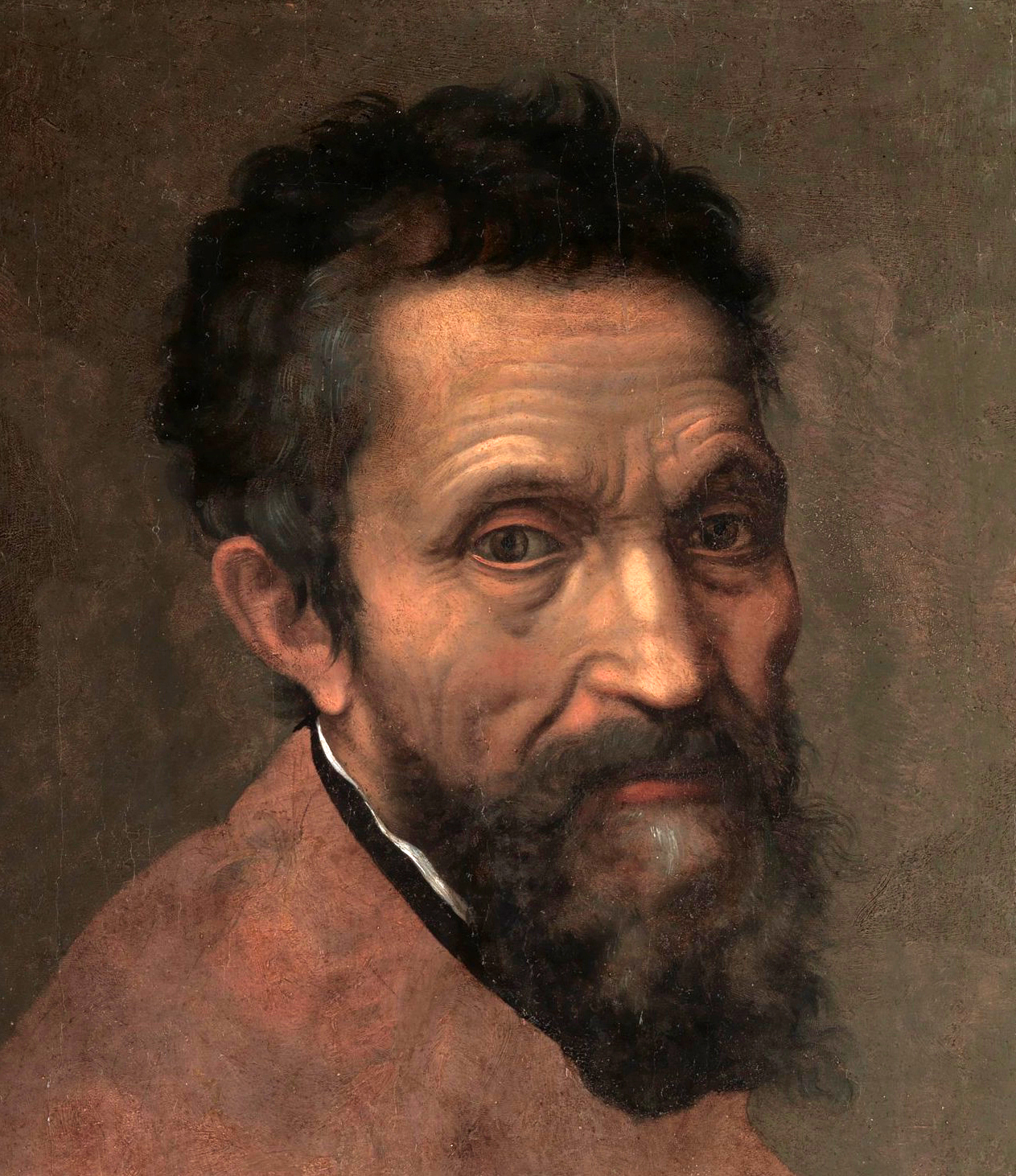
Michelangelo

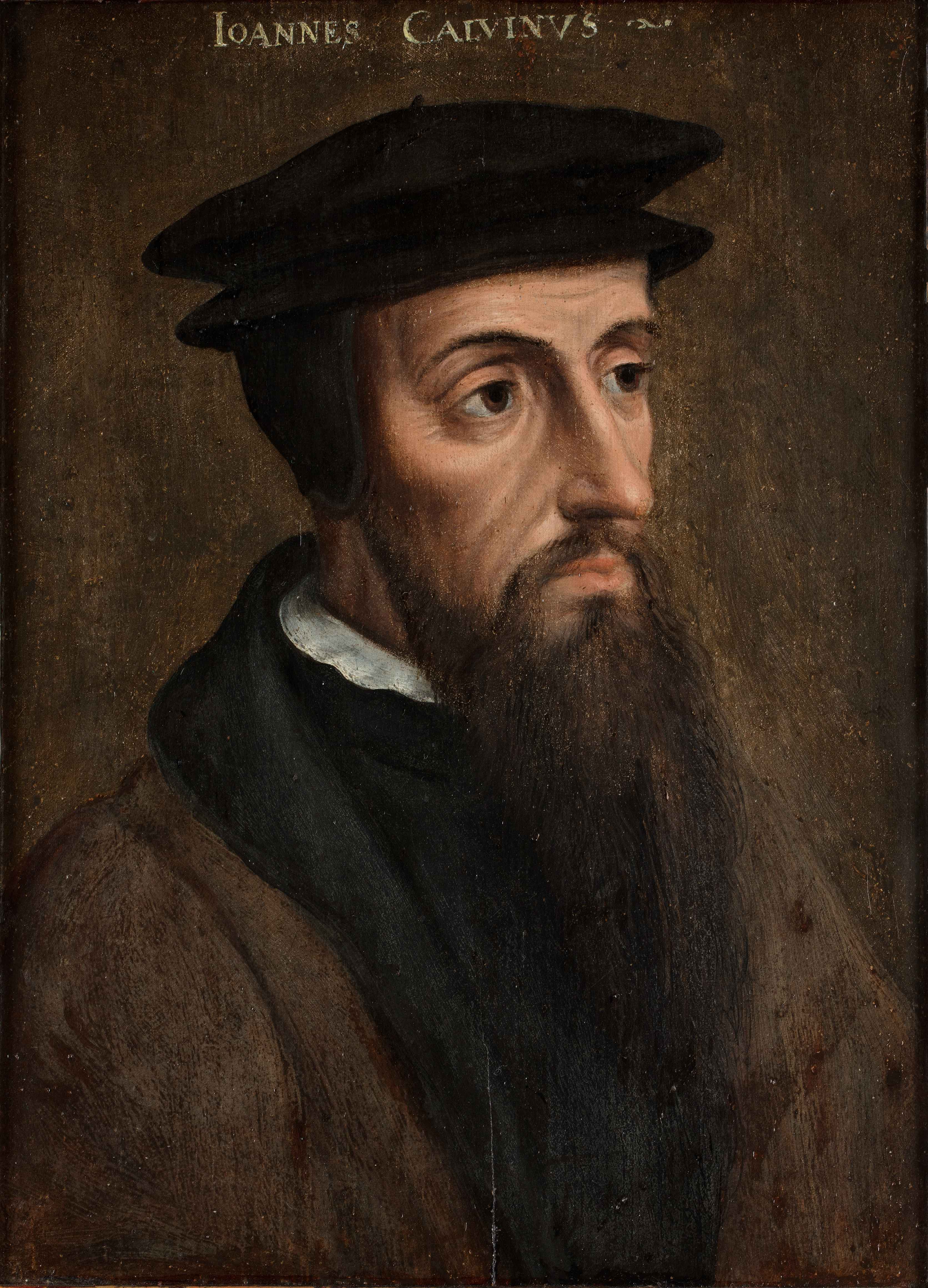
John Calvin

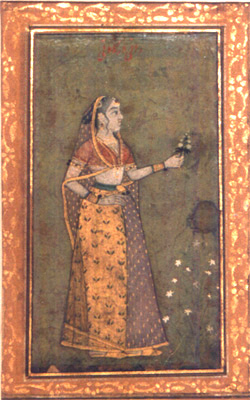
Rani Durgavati

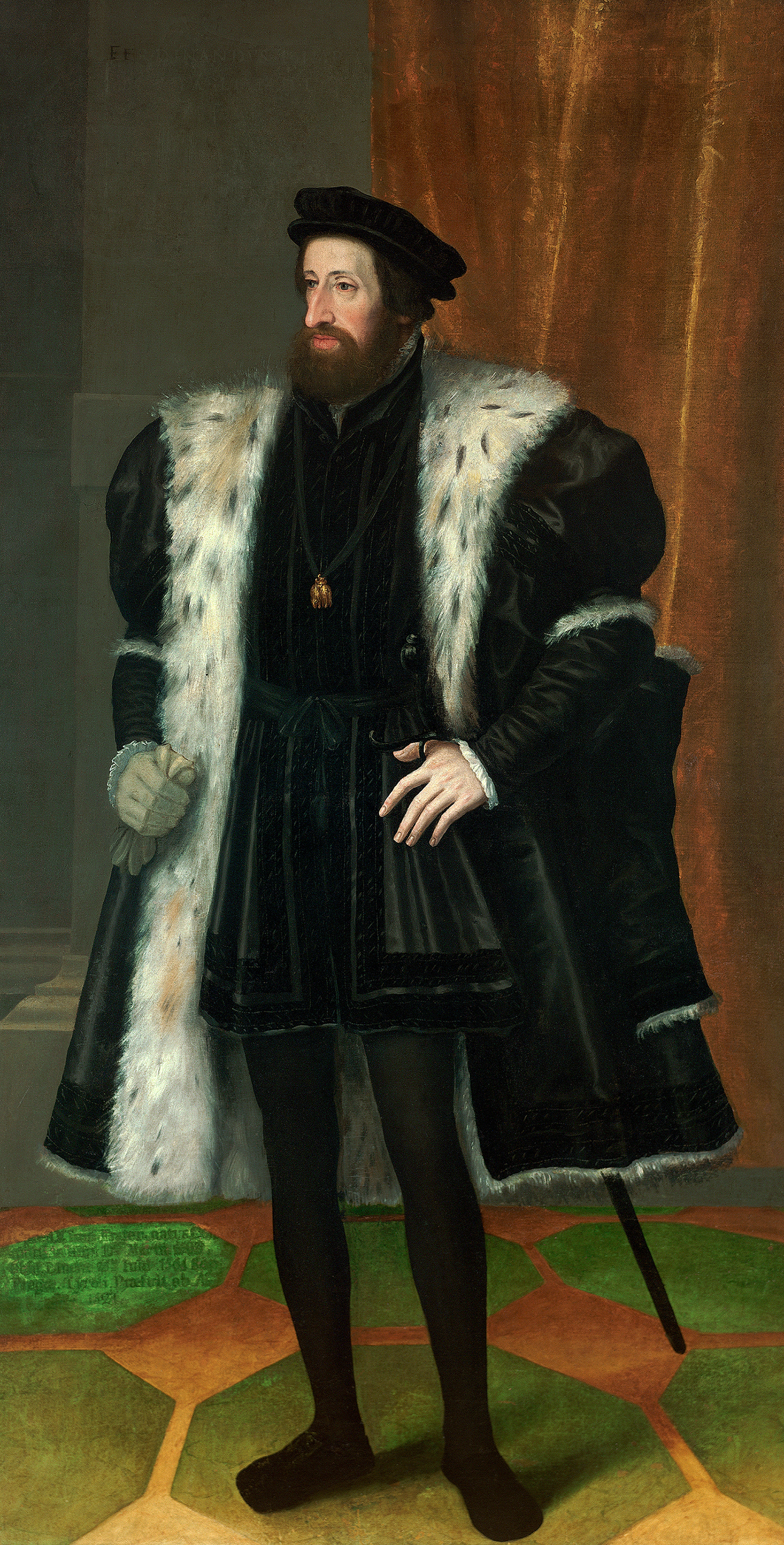
Ferdinand I, Holy Roman Emperor

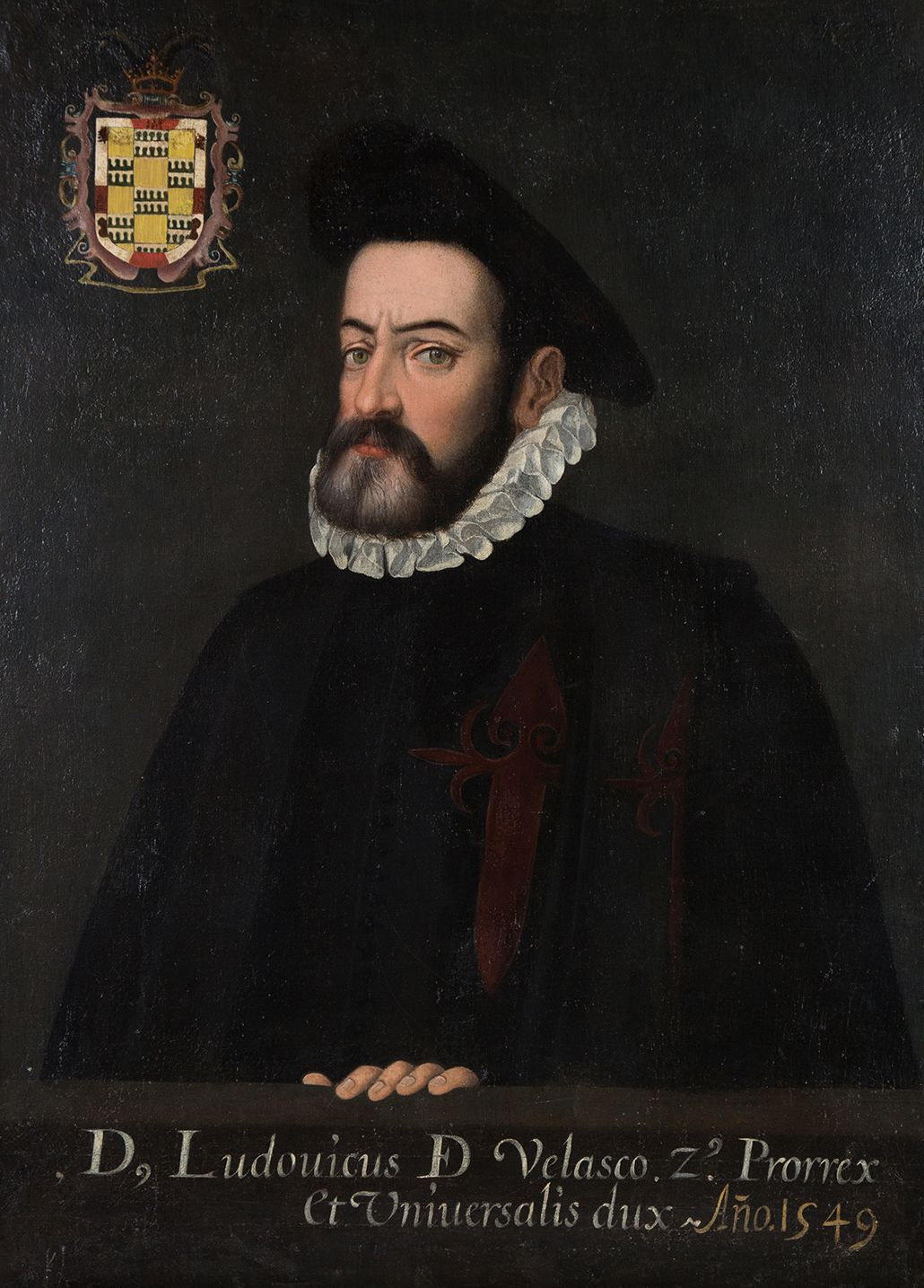
Luís de Velasco

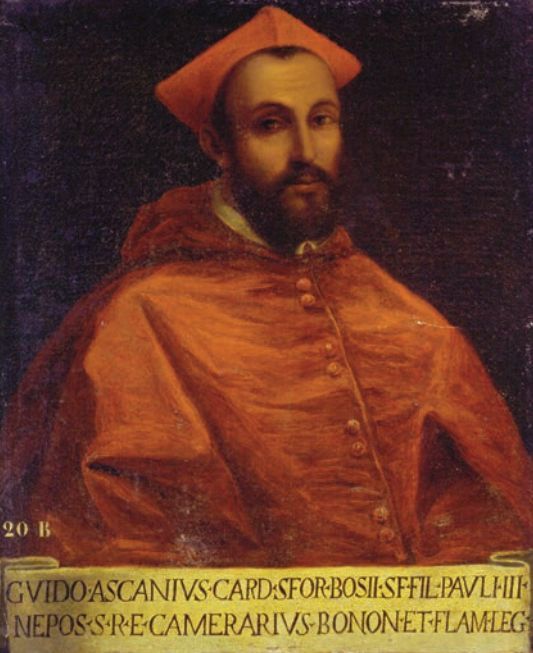
Guido Ascanio Sforza di Santa Fiora

- January 9 – Margaret Howard, Duchess of Norfolk (b. 1540)
- February 18 – Michelangelo, Italian artist, architect and sculptor (b. 1475)
- February 19 – Guillaume Morel, French classical scholar (b. 1505)
- March 5 – Isabella Losa, Spanish scholar (b. 1491)
- March 27 – Lütfi Pasha, Albanian-born Ottoman statesman, juridical scholar and poet of slave origin (b. c. 1488)
- April – Pierre Belon, French naturalist (b. 1517)
- April 9 – Georg Hartmann, German instrument maker (b. 1489)
- May 2 – Cardinal Rodolfo Pio da Carpi, Italian humanist and patron of the arts (b. 1500)
- May 27 – John Calvin, French Protestant reformer (b. 1509)
- June 24 – Rani Durgavati, Indian queen (b. 1524)
- July 23 – Eléanor de Roucy de Roye, French noble (b. 1535)
- July 25 – Ferdinand I, Holy Roman Emperor (b. 1503)
- July 31 – Luís de Velasco, Viceroy of New Spain (b. 1511)
- August 10 – Miyoshi Nagayoshi, Japanese samurai and daimyō (b. 1522)
- August 30 – Duchess Sabina of Bavaria (b. 1492)
- October 5 – Pierre de Manchicourt, Flemish composer
- October 6 – Guido Ascanio Sforza di Santa Fiora, Italian Catholic cardinal (b. 1518)
- October 15 – Andreas Vesalius, Flemish anatomist (b. 1514)
- October 18 – Johannes Acronius Frisius, German physician and mathematician (b. 1520)
- December 6 – Ambrosius Blarer, influential German reformer in southern Germany and north-eastern Switzerland (b. 1492)
- date unknown
  - Giovanni da Udine, Italian painter (b. 1487)
  - Purandara Dasa, Indian musician (b. 1484)
  - Charles Estienne, French anatomist (b. 1503)
  - Isabella de Luna, Spanish-Italian courtesan
- probable – Maurice Scève, French poet (b. 1500)

1565

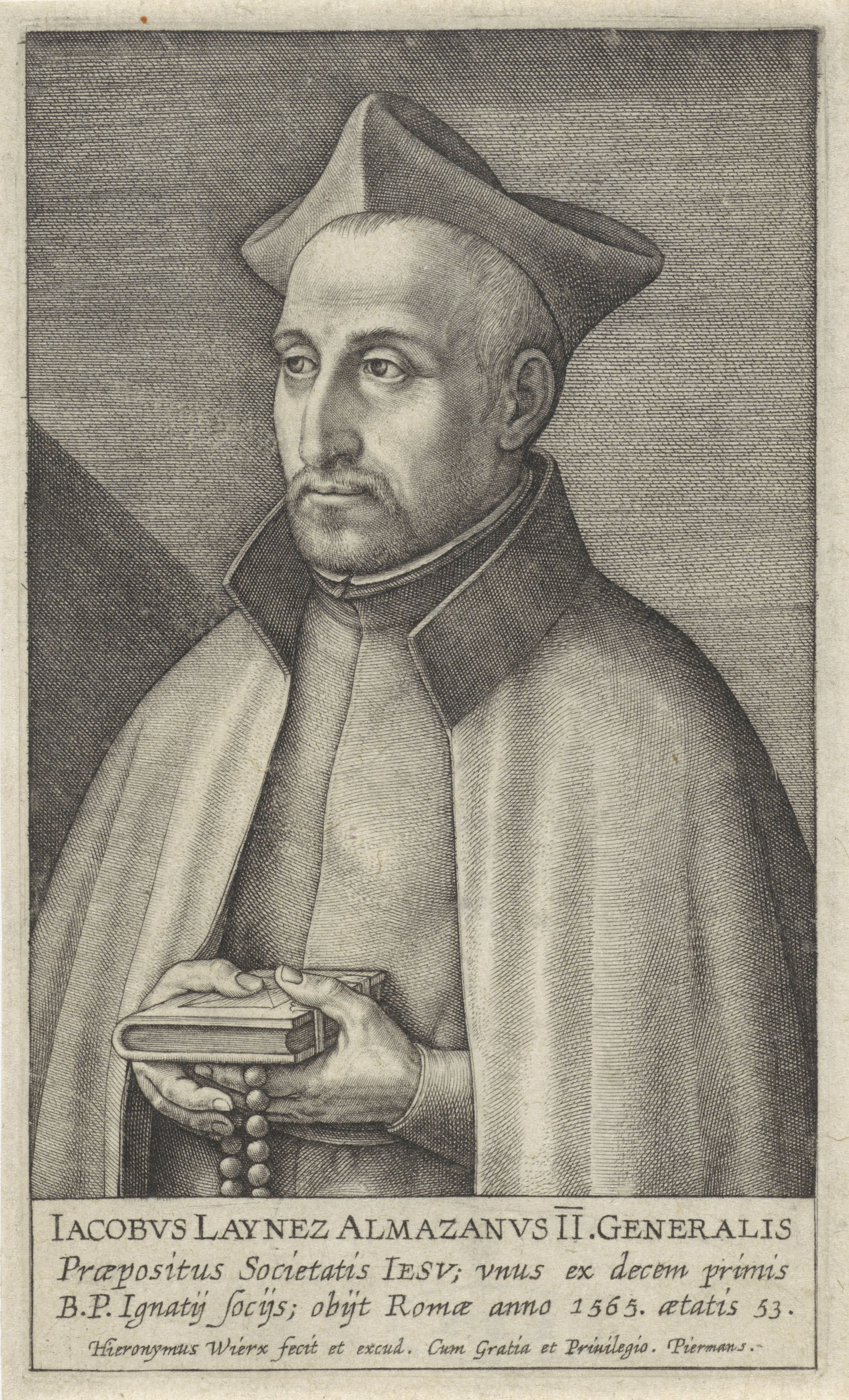
Diego Laynez

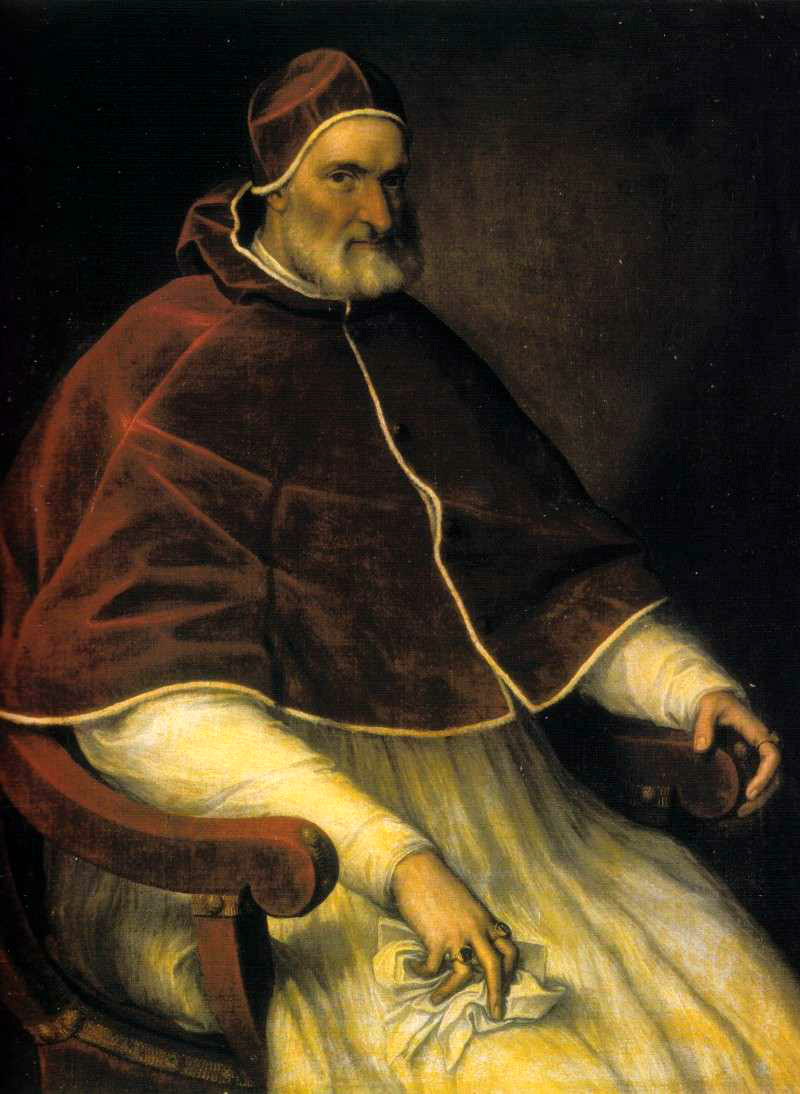
Pope Pius IV

- January 19 – Diego Laynez, Spanish Jesuit theologian (b. 1512)
- January 28 – Francisco Cesi, Italian Catholic cardinal (b. 1500)
- February 28 – John, Duke of Münsterberg-Oels and Count of Glatz (b. 1509)
- March 17 – Alexander Ales, Scottish theologian (b. 1500)
- c. March – Lope de Rueda, Spanish dramatist (b. c. 1510)
- April 2 – Elisabeth Parr, Marchioness of Northampton, English noble (b. 1526)
- April 27 – Osanna of Cattaro, Dominican visionary and anchoress (b. 1493)
- May 14 – Nicolaus von Amsdorf, German Protestant reformer (b. 1483)
- May 5 – Queen Munjeong, Korean queen (b. 1501)
- May 28 – Mikołaj "the Black" Radziwiłł, Polish magnate (b. 1515)
- June 12 – Adrianus Turnebus, French classical scholar (b. 1512)
- June 17 – Ashikaga Yoshiteru, Japanese shogun (b. 1536)
- June 19 – Wolfgang Lazius, Austrian historian (b. 1514)
- June 23 – Turgut Reis, Ottoman naval commander (b. 1485)
- July 18 – Kat Ashley, governess of Elizabeth I of England
- August – Jacques Buus, Flemish composer and organist (b. 1500)
- August 29 – Alfonso Carafa, Italian cardinal (b. 1540)
- June 25 – Herluf Trolle, Danish Admiral of the Fleet and co-founder of Herlufsholm School (b. 1516)
- September 13 – William Farel, French evangelist (b. 1489)
- September 11–20 – Cipriano de Rore, Flemish composer and teacher (b. 1515)
- October 4 – Pier Paolo Vergerio, Italian reformer (b. 1498)
- October 5 – Lodovico Ferrari, Italian mathematician (b. 1522)
- October 7 – Johannes Mathesius, German theologian (b. 1504)
- October 12 – Jean Ribault, French explorer and colonizer (b. 1520)
- October 14 – Thomas Chaloner, English statesman and poet (b. 1521)
- October 21 – John Frederick III, Duke of Saxony and nominal Duke of Saxe-Gotha (b. 1538)
- October 22 – Jean, Vicomte d'Aguisy Grolier de Servieres, French bibliophile (b. 1479)
- October 29 – Ranuccio Farnese, Italian prelate (b. 1530)
- November 2 – Mechthild of Bavaria, German duchess (b. 1532)
- November 25 – Hu Zongxian, Chinese general (b. 1512)
- December 9 – Pope Pius IV (b. 1499)
- December 12 – Johan Rantzau, German general (b. 1492)
- December 13 – Conrad Gessner, Swiss naturalist (b. 1516)
- date unknown
  - Antonio Bernieri, Italian painter of the Renaissance period (b. 1516)
  - Yadegar Mokhammad of Kazan, last khan of Kazan Khanate
  - Paweł Tarło, canon of Kraków, Poland

1566

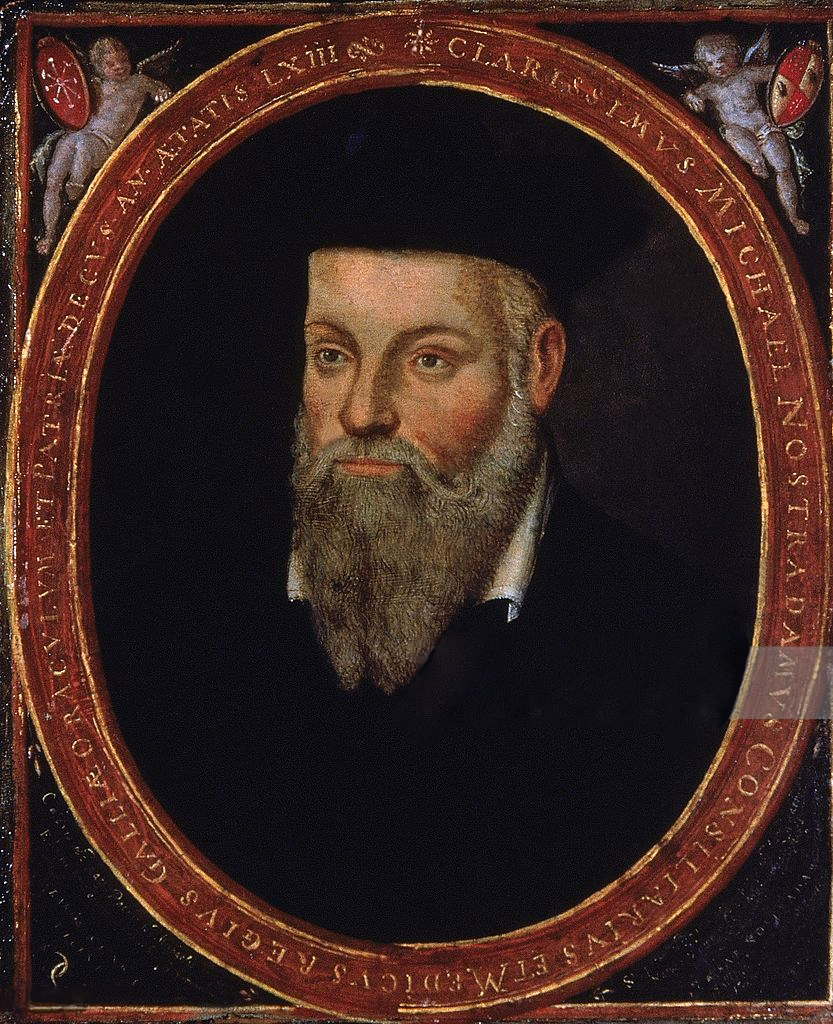
Nostradamus

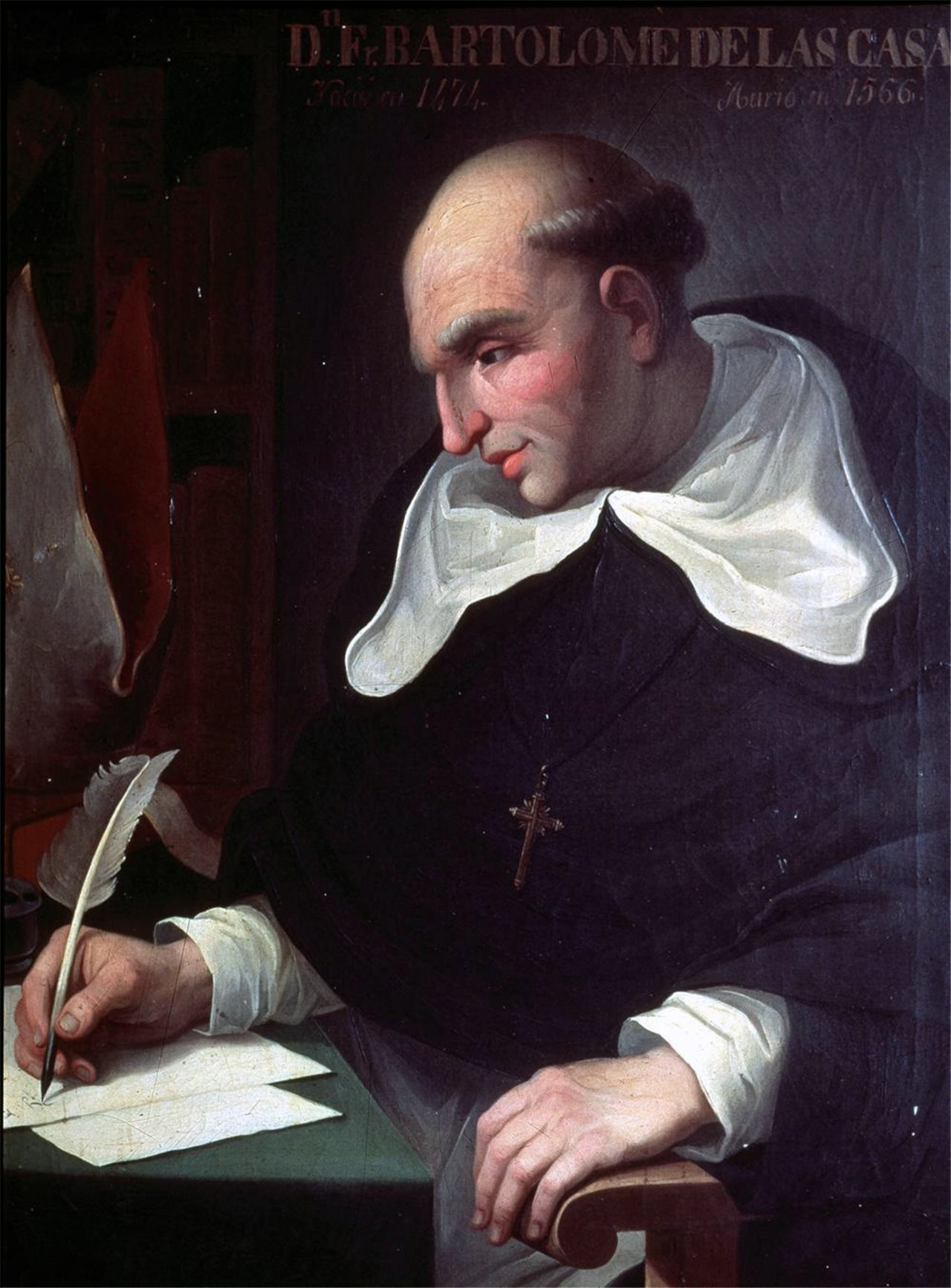
Bartolomé de las Casas

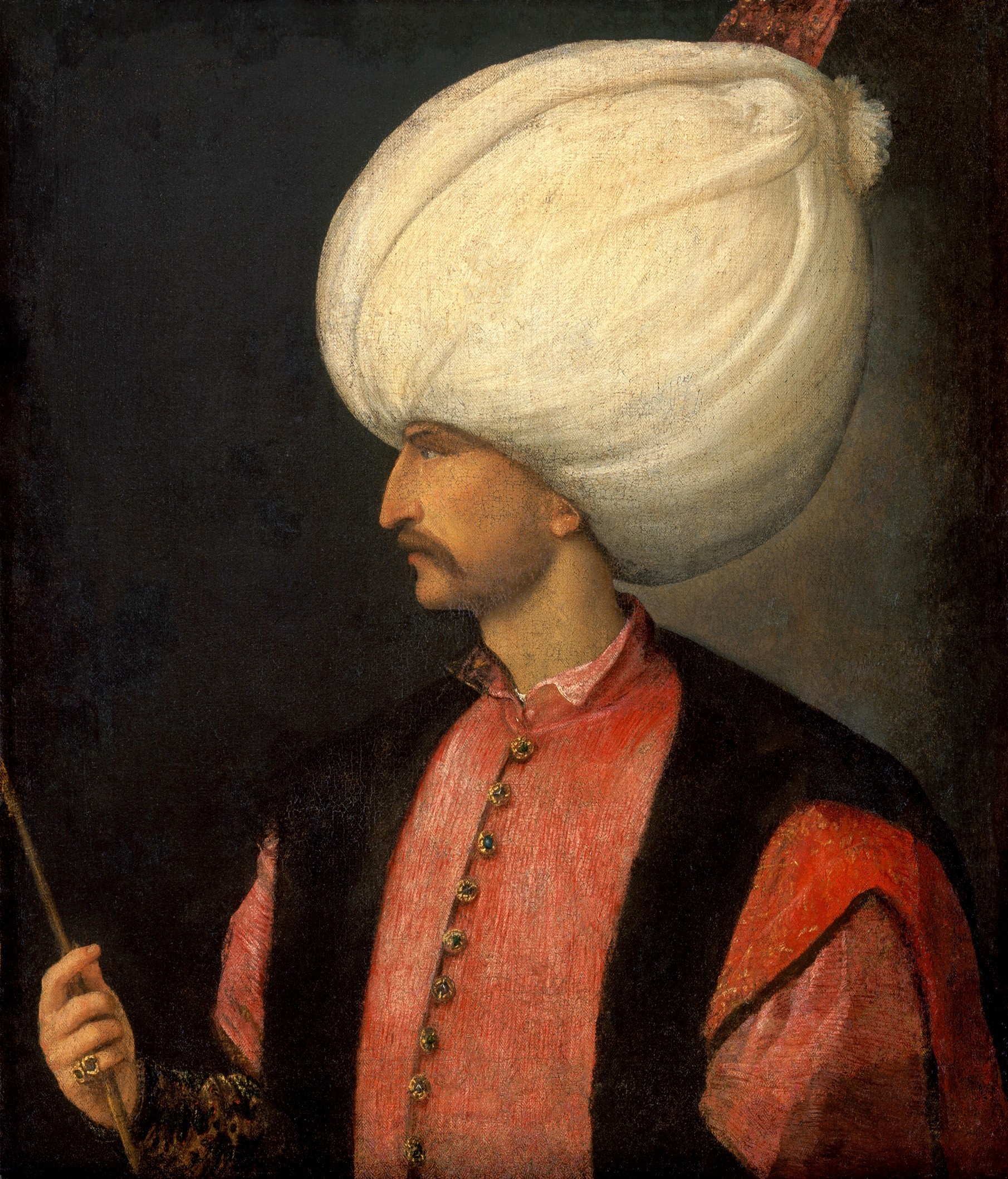
Sultan Suleiman the Magnificent

- January 6 – Francesco Gonzaga, Spanish Catholic cardinal (b. 1538)
- January 7 – Louis de Blois, Flemish mystical writer (b. 1506)
- February 3 – George Cassander, Flemish theologian (b. 1513)
- February 24 – Mimura Iechika, Japanese warlord (b. 1517)
- March 9 – David Rizzio, Italian secretary of Mary, Queen of Scots (b. 1533)
- March 23 – Wolfgang, Prince of Anhalt-Köthen, German prince (b. 1492)
- March 26 – Antonio de Cabezón, Spanish composer and organist (b. 1510)
- March 28 – Sigismund von Herberstein, Austrian diplomat (b. 1486)
- April 25 – Diane de Poitiers, mistress of King Henry II of France (b. 1499)
- April 25 – Louise Labé, French poet (b. c. 1524)
- May 10 – Leonhart Fuchs, German physician and a botanist (b. 1501)
- July 2 – Nostradamus, French astrologer (b. 1503)
- July 13 – Thomas Hoby, English diplomat and translator (b. 1530)
- July 18 – Bartolomé de las Casas, Spanish priest (b. 1484)
- July 30 – Guillaume Rondelet, French doctor (b. 1507)
- August 19 – Elisabeth of Brunswick-Calenberg, Countess of Henneberg (b. 1526)
- September 2 – Taddeo Zuccari, Italian painter (b. 1529)
- September 6 – Suleiman the Magnificent, Ottoman Sultan since 1520 (b. 1494)
- September 17 – Íñigo López de Mendoza, 4th Duke of the Infantado (b. 1493)
- September 22 – Johannes Agricola, German Protestant reformer (b. 1494)
- September 27 – Marco Girolamo Vida, Italian poet (b. 1490)
- October 13 – Zilia Dandolo, Venetian dogaressa
- October 28 – Johann Funck, German theologian (b. 1518)
- October 31 – Richard Edwardes, English poet (b. 1523)
- November 2 – Thomas White, English politician (b. 1507)
- November 17 – Annibale Caro, Italian poet and Knight of Malta (b. 1507)
- November 27 – Froben Christoph of Zimmern, author of the Zimmern Chronicle (b. 1519)
- December 1 – Francisco Mendoza de Bobadilla, Spanish Catholic cardinal (b. 1508)
- December 14 – René, Marquis of Elbeuf (b. 1536)
- December 26 – Kimotsuki Kanetsugu, Japanese samurai (b. 1511)
- December 28 – Margaret Paleologa, Sovereign Marchioness of Montferrat (1531–1540) (b. 1510)
- date unknown
  - Charles Dumoulin, French jurist (b. 1500)
  - Calvagh O'Donnell, Irish chieftain
- probable – Jacob Acontius, Swiss jurist, theologian, philosopher and engineer (b. 1492)

1567

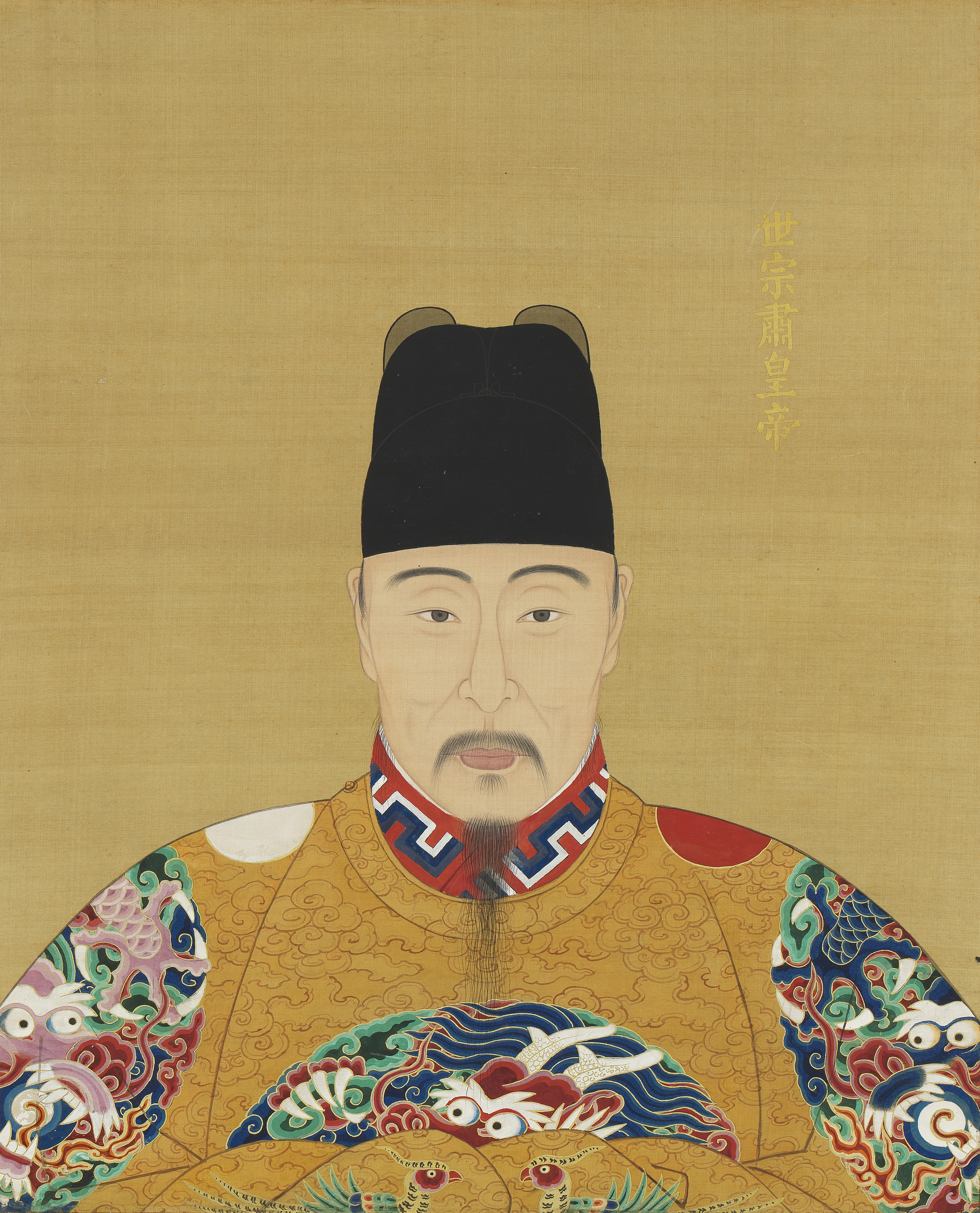
Emperor Jiajing

- January 12 – Eva von Trott, German noble and courtier (b. 1505)
- January 17 – Sampiero Corso, Corsican mercenary leader (b. 1498)
- January 23 – Jiajing Emperor of China (b. 1507)
- January 26 – Nicholas Wotton, English diplomat (c. b. 1497)
- February 10 – Henry Stuart, Lord Darnley, consort of Mary, Queen of Scots (b. 1545)
- February 20 – Estácio de Sá, Portuguese officer, founder of Rio de Janeiro (b. 1520)
- March 31 – Philip I, Landgrave of Hesse (b. 1504)
- April 1 – Jan Krzysztof Tarnowski, Polish nobleman (b. 1537)
- April 2 – Ernest III, Duke of Brunswick-Grubenhagen (b. 1518)
- April 18 – Wilhelm von Grumbach, German adventurer (b. 1503)
- April 19 – Michael Stifel, German mathematician (b. 1487)
- May 2 – Marin Držić, Croatian writer (b. 1508)
- June 2 – Shane O'Neill, Irish chieftain (b. 1530)
- June 12 – Richard Rich, Lord Chancellor of England (b. 1490)
- June 19 – Anna of Brandenburg, Duchess of Mecklenburg-Güstrow (b. 1507)
- August 3 – Myeongjong of Joseon, ruler of Korea (b. 1534)
- August 18 – Enea Vico, Italian engraver (b. 1523)
- October 1 – Pietro Carnesecchi, Italian humanist (b. 1508)
- October 31 – Marie of Brandenburg-Kulmbach, Princess of Brandenburg-Kulmbach and by marriage Electress Palatine (b. 1519)
- November 12 – Anne de Montmorency, Constable of France (b. 1493)
- November 13 – Pedro de la Gasca, viceroy of Peru (b. 1485)
- November 19 – Takeda Yoshinobu, Japanese daimyō (b. 1538)
- date unknown
  - Thomas Beccon, English Protestant reformer (b. 1511)
  - Péter Erdődy, ban of Croatia (b. 1504)
  - Shahghali, khan of Qasim (b. 1505)
  - Lawrence Sheriff, English gentleman and grocer to Elizabeth I (b. 1510)
  - Akagawa Motoyasu, Japanese samurai

1568

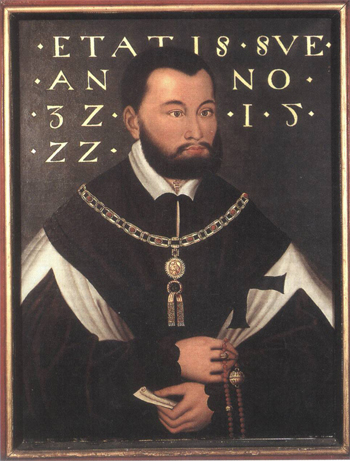
Albert, Duke of Prussia

- January 26 – Lady Catherine Grey, Countess of Hertford (b. 1540)
- February 15 – Hendrick van Brederode, Dutch reformer (b. 1531)
- March 19 – Elizabeth Seymour, Lady Cromwell, English noblewoman (b.c. 1518)
- March 20 (plague)
  - Albert, Duke of Prussia (b. 1490)
  - Anna Marie of Brunswick-Lüneburg, Duchess of Prussia (b. 1532)
- May 23 – Adolf of Nassau, Count of Nassau, Dutch soldier (b. 1540)
- April 7 – Onofrio Panvinio, Italian Augustinian historian (b. 1529)
- April 27 – Giovanni Michele Saraceni, Italian Catholic cardinal (b. 1498)
- May 6 – Bernardo Salviati, Italian Catholic cardinal (b. 1508)
- May 15 – Anna of Lorraine (b. 1522)
- May 23 – Jean de Ligne, Duke of Arenberg (b. 1528)
- June 3 – Andrés de Urdaneta, Spanish explorer (b. 1508)
- June 5
  - Lamoral, Count of Egmont, Flemish statesman (b. 1522)
  - Philip de Montmorency, Count of Horn (b. c. 1524)
- June 11 – Henry V, Duke of Brunswick-Lüneburg and Prince of Wolfenbüttel 1514–1568 (b. 1489)
- July 1 – Levinus Lemnius, Dutch writer (b. 1505)
- July 6 – Johannes Oporinus, Swiss printer (b. 1507)
- July 7 – William Turner, British ornithologist and botanist (b. 1508)
- July 24 – Carlos, Prince of Asturias, son of Philip II of Spain (b. 1545)
- August 15 – Stanislaus Kostka, Polish saint (b. 1550)
- August 21 – Jean Parisot de Valette, 49th Grandmaster of the Knights Hospitaller (b. 1495)
- August 23 – Thomas Wharton, 1st Baron Wharton (b. 1495)
- September 26 – Leonor de Cisneros, Spanish Protestant (b. 1536)
- September – Anna Pehrsönernas moder, influential Swedish courtier (b. year unknown)
- September 22 – Jöran Persson, Swedish politician (b. c. 1530) (executed)
- October 3 – Elisabeth of Valois, Queen of Philip II of Spain (b. 1545)
- October 14 – Jacques Arcadelt, Flemish composer (b. 1504)
- October 19 – Joannes Aurifaber Vratislaviensis, German theologian (b. 1517)
- October 28 – Ashikaga Yoshihide, Japanese shōgun (b. 1538)
- November 6 – Anna of Brunswick-Lüneburg, duchess consort of Pomerania (b. 1502)
- November 9 – John Radcliffe, English politician (b. 1539)
- December 23 – Roger Ascham, tutor of Elizabeth I of England (b. 1515)
- December 24 – Henry V, Burgrave of Plauen (b. 1533)
- December 28 – Christoph, Duke of Württemberg (b. 1515)
- December 31 – Shimazu Tadayoshi, Japanese warlord (b. 1493)
- date unknown
  - Garcia de Orta, Portuguese Jewish physician (b. 1501)
  - Dirk Philips, early Dutch Anabaptist writer and theologian (b. 1504)
  - Yan Song, Chinese prime minister (b. 1481)
  - Amato Lusitano, Portuguese physician (b. 1511)

1569

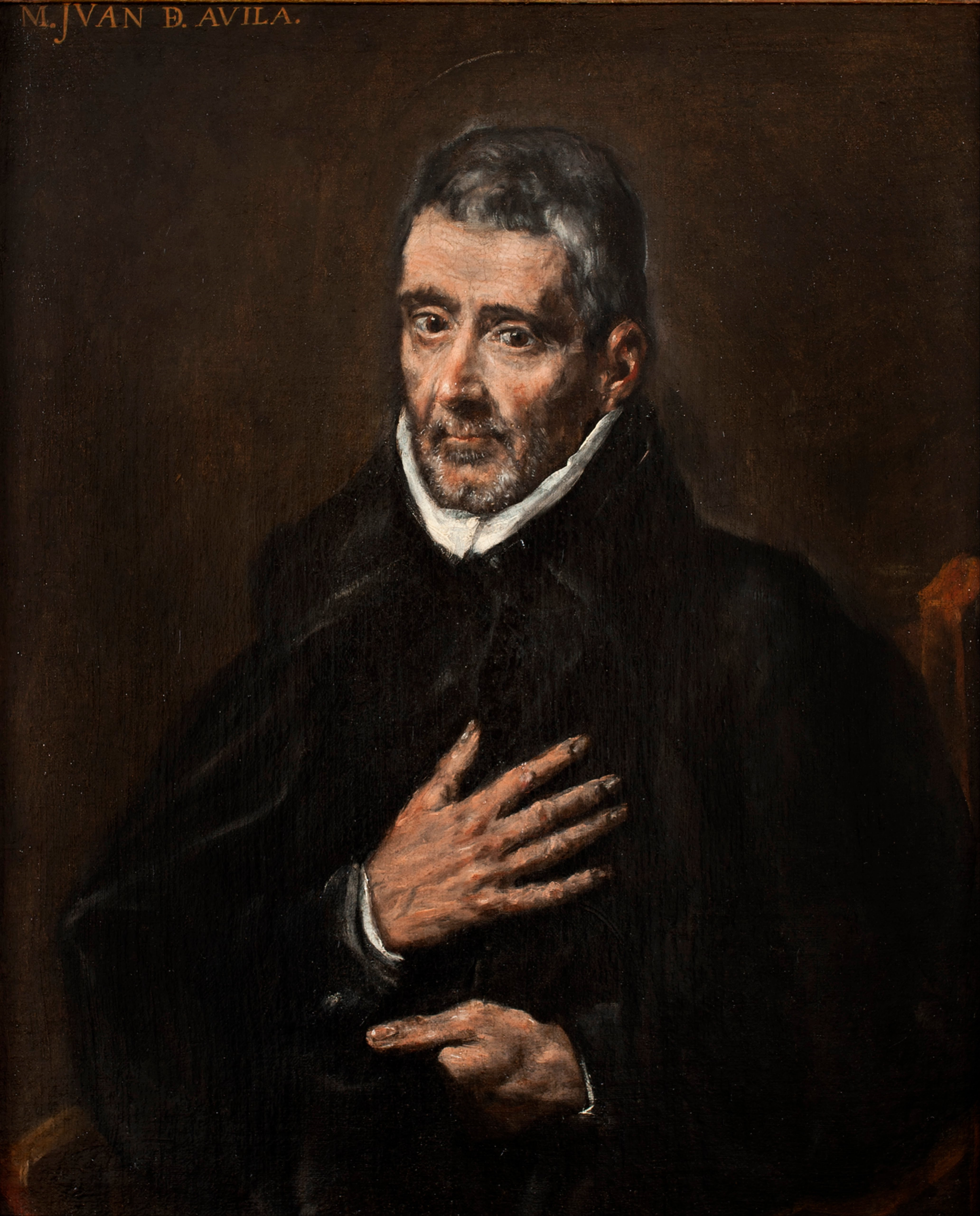
Saint John of Ávila

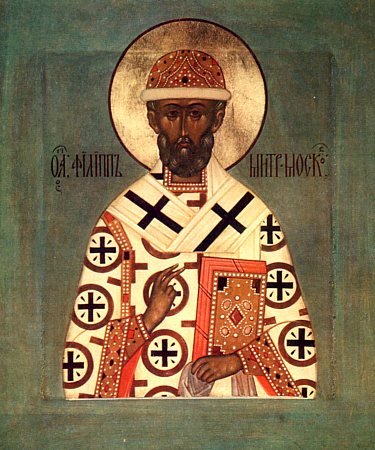
Philip II, Metropolitan of Moscow

- January 15 – Catherine Carey lady-in-waiting to Elizabeth I of England (b. 1524)
- January 20 – Myles Coverdale, English Bible translator (b. c. 1488)
- March 13 – Louis, Prince of Condé, French Protestant general (b. 1530)
- March 17 – Karl Christoph, Duke of Münsterberg (b. 1545)
- April 15 –Maha Chakkraphat, Siamese King of the Ayutthaya Kingdom (b. 1509)
- May 10 – John of Ávila, Spanish mystic and saint (b. 1500)
- May 16 – Dirk Willems, Dutch Anabaptist martyr
- May 17 – Georg, Count Palatine of Simmern-Sponheim (b. 1518)
- May 26 – Vidus Vidius, Italian surgeon and anatomist (b. 1509)
- May 27 – François de Coligny d'Andelot, French general (b. 1521)
- June 11 – Wolfgang, Count Palatine of Zweibrücken (b. 1526)
- September 5
  - Edmund Bonner, Bishop of London (b. c. 1500)
  - Bernardo Tasso, Italian courtier and poet (b. 1493)
- September 9 – Pieter Bruegel the Elder, Flemish painter
- September 11 – Vincenza Armani, Italian actress (b. 1530)
- October 3 – Philibert, Margrave of Baden-Baden (b. 1536)
- October 9 – Vladimir of Staritsa, Russian prince (b. 1533)
- October 28 – Ludovica Torelli, Count of Guastalla (b. 1500)
- November 24 – Celio Secondo Curione, Italian humanist (b. 1503)
- November 29 – António Ferreira, Portuguese poet (b. 1528)
- December 10 – Paul Eber, German Lutheran theologian (b. 1511)
- December 15 – Ludowika Margaretha of Zweibrücken-Bitsch, spouse of Count Philip V of Hanau-Lichtenberg (b. 1540)
- December 23 – Philip II, Metropolitan of Moscow (b. 1507)
- date unknown
  - Janet Beaton, Scottish noble (b. 1519)
  - Elin Andersdotter, Swedish lady-in-waiting and political conspirator
  - Gracia Mendes Nasi, Ottoman businessperson and philanthropist (b. 1510)
  - Mahinthrathirat, Ayutthaya king (b. 1539)
