= 1557 =

1557 in various calendars
- Gregorian calendar: 1557; MDLVII
- Ab urbe condita: 2310
- Armenian calendar: 1006; ԹՎ ՌԶ
- Assyrian calendar: 6307
- Balinese saka calendar: 1478–1479
- Bengali calendar: 963–964
- Berber calendar: 2507
- English Regnal year: 3 Ph. & M. – 4 Ph. & M.
- Buddhist calendar: 2101
- Burmese calendar: 919
- Byzantine calendar: 7065–7066
- Chinese calendar: 丙辰年 (Fire Dragon); 4254 or 4047 — to — 丁巳年 (Fire Snake); 4255 or 4048
- Coptic calendar: 1273–1274
- Discordian calendar: 2723
- Ethiopian calendar: 1549–1550
- Hebrew calendar: 5317–5318
- Hindu calendars
- Vikram Samvat: 1613–1614
- Shaka Samvat: 1478–1479
- Kali Yuga: 4657–4658
- Holocene calendar: 11557
- Igbo calendar: 557–558
- Iranian calendar: 935–936
- Islamic calendar: 964–965
- Japanese calendar: Kōji 3 (弘治３年)
- Javanese calendar: 1476–1477
- Julian calendar: 1557; MDLVII
- Korean calendar: 3890
- Minguo calendar: 355 before ROC 民前355年
- Nanakshahi calendar: 89
- Thai solar calendar: 2099–2100
- Tibetan calendar: མེ་ཕོ་འབྲུག་ལོ་ (male Fire-Dragon); 1683 or 1302 or 530 — to — མེ་མོ་སྦྲུལ་ལོ་ (female Fire-Snake); 1684 or 1303 or 531

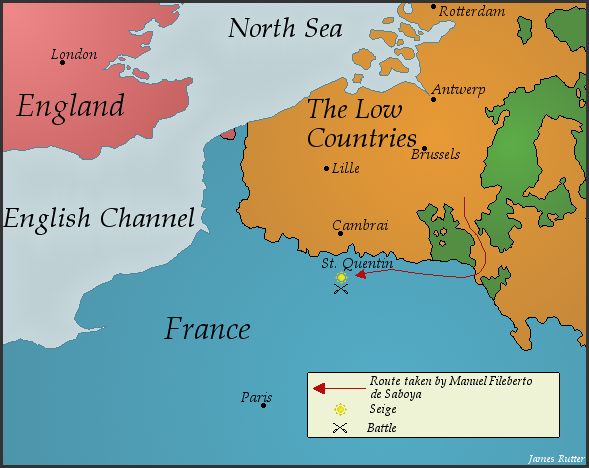
August 27: Battle of St. Quentin

Year 1557 (MDLVII) was a common year starting on Friday of the Julian calendar.

== Events ==
The first known equation, equivalent to 14x+15=71 in modern syntax.

=== January–March ===
- January 4 – Pietro Giovanni Chiavica Cibo becomes the new Doge of the Republic of Genoa for a term of 2 years as the term of the Doge Agostino Pinelli Ardimenti comes to an end.
- January 6 – Italian War of 1551–1559: Gaspard II de Coligny, the French governor of Picardy (in northern France), launches surprise attacks on Douai and Lens in the Spanish Netherlands and captures both cities for France.
- January 13 – Sigismund II Augustus, King of Poland and Grand Duke of Lithuania, issues an edict against Protestants, at the urging of the Archbishop Mikołaj Dzierzgowski, Primate of Poland.
- January 28 – Bayinnaung, King of Burma and head of the Toungoo dynasty, conquers two the Shan States, Möng Mit and Hsipaw in what is now northern Myanmar. The event is later commemorated with an inscription on the Shwezigon Pagoda Bell.
- February 4 – Pope Paul IV creates the metropolitan archdiocese of Portuguese India (based in Goa) separating the Goan diocese from the ecclesiastical province of Lisbon.
- February 24 – Delegates from Sweden, Finland and Russia arrive at Novgorod to negotiate a treaty to end the war between the two empires.
- March 11 – The Burmese conquest of the Shan States continues as the capital of the Mongkawng state, Mong Kawng, falls to the Toungoo dynasty invaders, five days after the March 6 surrender of the town of Mong Yang. The event is later commemorated on the Shwezigon Pagoda Bell.
- March – The Takeda clan besiege Katsurayama Castle in eastern Japan. The siege ends with the last stand of the castle garrison, and the complete destruction of Katsurayama, allowing the Takeda to further expand in Shinano Province.

=== April–June ===
- April 2 – The Treaty of Novgorod between Sweden and Russia is put into effect as delegates kiss the cross, as demanded by the Tsar Ivan IV.
- April 12 – The Spanish settlement of Cuenca, Ecuador, is founded.
- April 25 – English aristocrat Thomas Stafford attempts a rebellion against Queen Mary I, landing at Scarborough, North Yorkshire with two ships and 32 followers after crossing the English Channel from Dieppe in France. Upon landing, he captures Scarborough Castle and proclaims himself "Protector of the Realm".
- April 28 – Henry Neville, 5th Earl of Westmorland, arrives in Scarborough and ends the Stafford rebellion, arresting Stafford and the small rebel force.
- April 30 – Arauco War – Battle of Mataquito: Spanish forces of Governor Francisco de Villagra launch a dawn surprise attack against the Mapuche (headed by their toqui Lautaro), in present-day Chile.
- May 4 – The Stationers' Company, officially the Worshipful Company of Stationers and Newspaper Makers, is granted a royal charter and a monopoly on the English publishing industry. For the next 150 years, the Stationers will regulate and censor the printing industry until the passage of the Copyright Act 1710 on April 10, 1710.
- May 23 – The Shwezigon Pagoda Bell, weighing 7,560 pounds (3,430 kg), is dedicated. The Bell, commissioned by King Bayinnaung and located in the Myanmar city of Bagan, bears a detailed inscription of the 16th century Burmese conquest of the Shan States.
- May 28 – English rebel Thomas Stafford and 32 of his followers are beheaded at the Tower of London after being convicted of treason.
- May 29 – King Philip II of Spain signs a treaty in London with Iacopo VI being restored to rule of the Principality of Piombino a bargain with Cosimo I de' Medici.
- June 7 – Mary I of England joins her husband Philip II of Spain, in his war against France.
- June 10 – The New Testament of the Geneva Bible, a Protestant Bible translation into English (produced under the supervision of William Whittingham, and printed in Roman type), is published in Geneva.
- June 16 Sebastião I is crowned as the new King of Portugal, five days after the death of his father, King João III.
- June 18 – Mass executions by burning at the stake resume in England for Protestants convicted of heresy under the law of England's Catholic ruler, Queen Mary I. On the first day, four women and three men are put to death at Maidstone at Kent. The next day, at Canterbury, another seven prisoners are burned. On June 22, ten more people (six men and four women) burn at the stake at Lewes at Sussex. In all, 24 people (12 men and 12 women) are killed in a five-day period
- By June – The 1557 influenza pandemic, probably originating in China, spreads to Europe.

=== July–September ===
- July 3 – The small Stato dei Presidi, a 300 square kilometres (120 sq mi) section of Spanish territory on the Tuscan coast of Italy, is created by a treaty between Cosimo I de' Medici (Duke of the Florentine Republic and the future Grand Duke of Tuscany) and King Felipe II of Spain. In return, Cosimo receives the rest of the former Republic of Siena.
- July 24 – The Edict of Compiègne is issued by King Henri II of France, providing for the death penalty to be applied to Protestants for a variety of crimes, including a relapse after having renounced Protestantism; unauthorized travel to Geneva; publication of Protestant books; possessing graven images; and unauthorized participation in Protestant religious gatherings, whether public or private.
- July 25 – In India, Sikandar Shah Suri, Sultan of the Sur Empire in Punjab, surrenders the fortress at Mau in the Nurpur kingdom (now in Uttar Pradesh) after a six month siege by the Mughal Empire. Mughal General Bairam Khan allows Sikandar to live in exile in Bihar, while Bakht Mal, Raja of Nurpur is imprisoned at Lahore and later beheaded.
- August 27 – Battle of St. Quentin: French forces under Marshal Anne de Montmorency, 1st Duke of Montmorency are decisively defeated by the Spanish and English under Emmanuel Philibert, Duke of Savoy, after a 17-day battle. Montmorency himself is captured, but Philip II refuses to press his advantage, and withdraws to the Netherlands.
- September 11– The Colloquy of Worms convenes in Germany as a dialog on religious issues between clerics of the German Catholic Church and the Lutheran Church.
- September 12– The Spanish occupation of the Papal States is confirmed as Pope Paul IV signs a separate peace treaty, the Peace of Cave-Palestrina, with Spain's Duke of Alba, who has massed troops outside of Rome in preparationfor an attack.

=== October–December ===
- October 8 – The Colloquy of Worms is adjourned with no resolution on reconciling the differences between Catholicism and Protestantism, after the parties are unable to agree on the concepts of original sin and theological justification.
- October 23 – Mohammed al-Shaykh, Sultan of Morocco since 1549, is assassinated by Ottoman soldiers who had infiltrated the Moroccan army. The assassination comes on orders of the Ottoman sultan after Mohammed makes plans for an alliance with Spain against the Ottoman Empire. Mohammed is succeeded by his son, Abdallah al-Ghalib.
- November 17 (27th day of the 10th month of Kōji 3) – Prince Michihito of Japan becomes the Emperor Ōgimachi almost two months after the September 27 death of his father, the Emperor Go-Nara.
- December 24 – In Bucharest, Mircea the Shepherd becomes the Prince of Wallachia for the third time, succeeding Pătrașcu the Good, who has died suddenly.
- December 30 – Italian War of 1551–1559: King Henri II of France, through his ambassador Jean Cavenac de la Vigne sends a letter to Suleiman the Magnificent, Sultan of the Ottoman Empire for the dispatch of 150 Ottoman Navy ships to protect the French coast.

=== Date unknown ===
- Özdemir Pasha conquers the Red Sea port of Massawa for the Ottoman Empire.
- With the permission of the Ming dynasty government of China, and for the benefit of both Western and Eastern merchants, the Portuguese settle in Macau (retroceded in 1999). Direct Sino-Portuguese trade has existed since 1513, but this is the first official legal treaty port on traditional Chinese soil, that will form a long-term Western settlement.
- Spain becomes bankrupt, throwing the German banking houses into chaos.
- Gonville and Caius College, Cambridge, is refounded by John Caius.
- The following schools are founded in England:
  - Brentwood School, Essex, by Sir Antony Browne.
  - Hampton School, Hampton, London, by Robert Hammond.
  - Repton School, by Sir John Port.
- Welsh-born mathematician Robert Recorde publishes The Whetstone of Witte in London, containing the first recorded use of the equals sign, and the first use in English of plus and minus signs.
- German adventurer Hans Staden publishes a widely translated account of his detention by the Tupí people of Brazil, Warhaftige Historia und beschreibung eyner Landtschafft der Wilden Nacketen, Grimmigen Menschfresser-Leuthen in der Newenwelt America gelegen ("True Story and Description of a Country of Wild, Naked, Grim, Man-eating People in the New World, America").

== Births ==
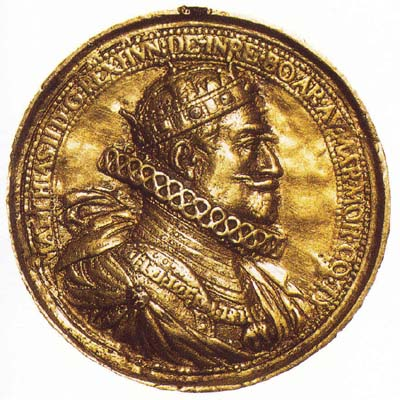
Matthias, Holy Roman Emperor

- January 1 – Stephen Bocskay, Prince of Transylvania (d. 1606)
- February 11 – Johannes Wtenbogaert, Leader of the Remonstrants (d. 1644)
- February 15
  - Alfonso Fontanelli, Italian composer (d. 1622)
  - Vittoria Accoramboni, Italian noblewoman (d. 1585)
- February 24 – Mathias, Holy Roman Emperor (d. 1619)
- March 1 – Anne Howard, Countess of Arundel, English countess and poet (d. 1630)
- March 22 – Casimir VI, Duke of Pomerania and Lutheran Administrator of Cammin Prince-Bishopric (d. 1605)
- March 25 – Maddalena Aceiaiuoli, Tuscan noblewoman and poet (d. 1610)
- April 4 – Lew Sapieha, Polish-Lithuanian noble (d. 1633)
- April 11 – Frederick, Count Palatine of Zweibrücken-Vohenstrauss-Parkstein (d. 1597)
- May 5 – Emanuel Philibert de Lalaing, Belgian noble and army commander (d. 1590)
- May 31 – Tsar Feodor I of Russia (d. 1598)
- June 28 – Philip Howard, 20th Earl of Arundel, English nobleman (d. 1595)
- August 2 – At Colchester in England, 10 convicted Protestant heretics are burned at the stake.
- August 16 – Agostino Carracci, Italian painter and graphical artist (d. 1602)
- August 19 – Frederick I, Duke of Württemberg (d. 1608)
- August 26 – Sibylle of Jülich-Cleves-Berg, Duchess of Jülich-Cleves-Berg by birth and by marriage Margravine of Burgau (d. 1628)
- September 4 – Sophie of Mecklenburg-Güstrow, Danish-Norwegian royal consort (d. 1631)
- September 11 – Joseph Calasanz, Spanish priest and founder of Piarists (d. 1648)
- September 16 – Jacques Mauduit, French composer (d. 1627)
- October 5 – Antoine Favre, Savoisian lawyer, first President of the Sovereign Senate of Savoy (d. 1624)
- date unknown
  - Giovanni Croce, Italian composer (d. 1609)
  - Balthasar Gérard, assassin of William I of Orange (d. 1584)
  - Toda Katsushige, Japanese warlord (d. 1600)
  - Olaus Martini, Archbishop of Uppsala (d. 1609)
  - Thomas Morley, English composer (d. 1602)
  - Oda Nobutada, Japanese general (d. 1582)
- probable – Giovanni Gabrieli, Italian composer and organist (d. 1612)

== Deaths ==
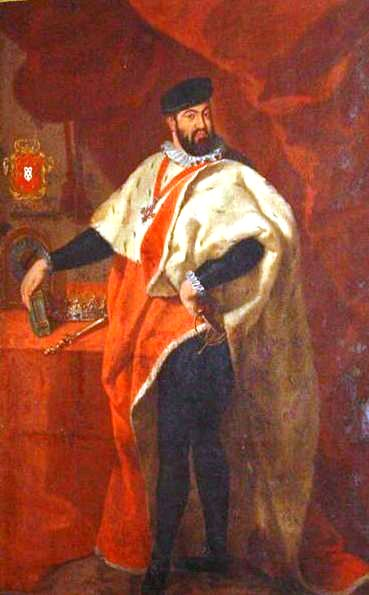
John III of Portugal

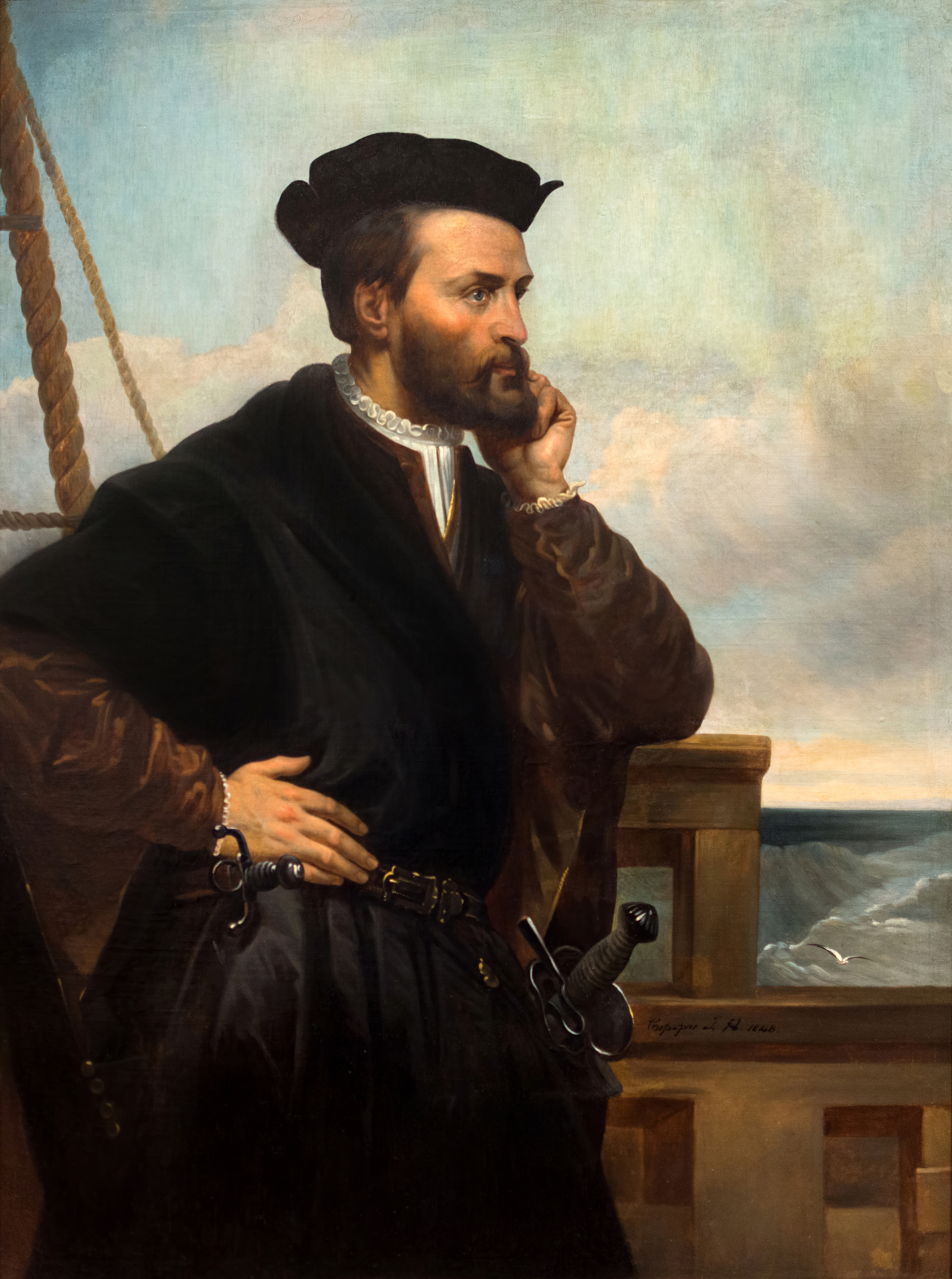
Jacques Cartier

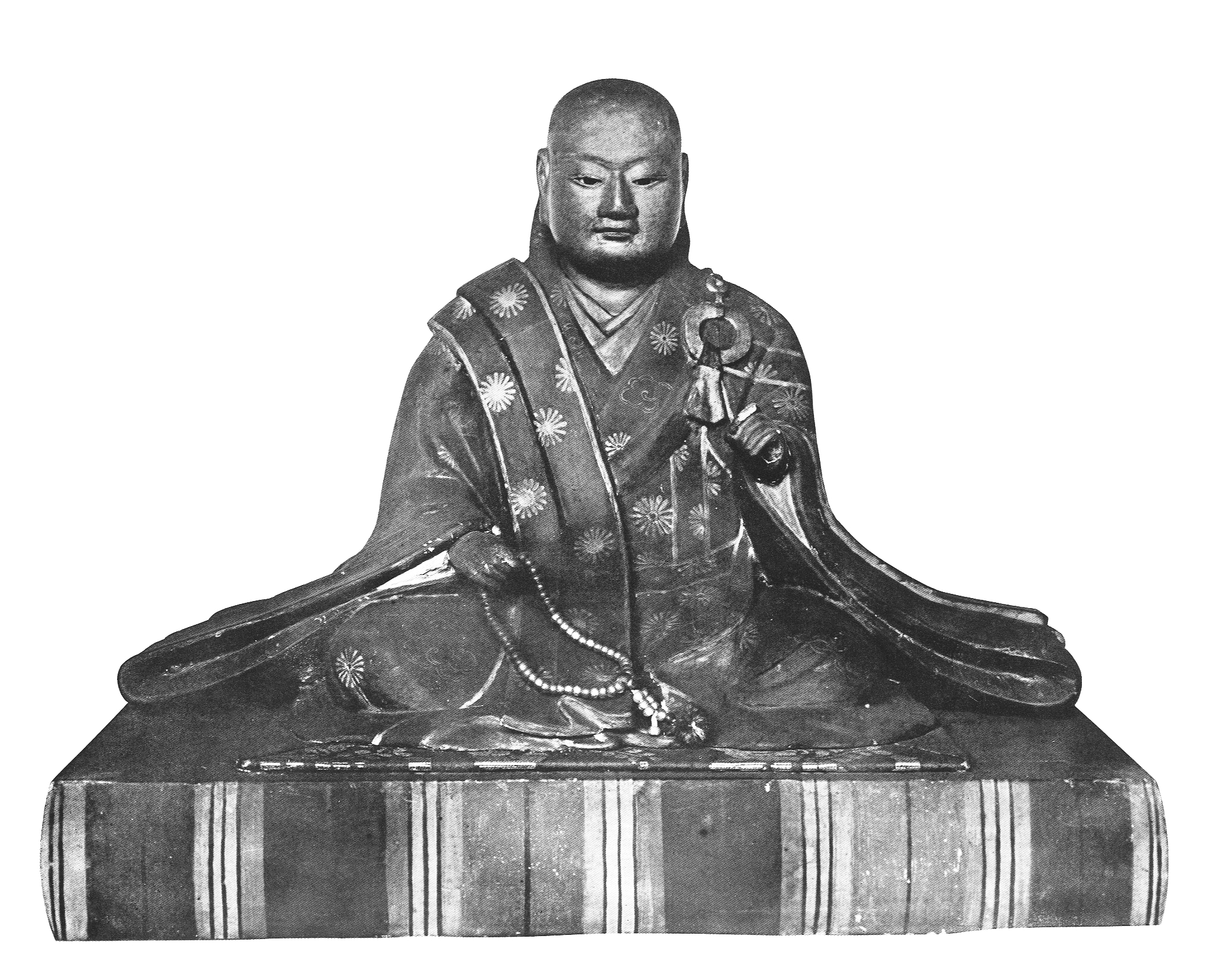
Emperor Go-Nara of Japan

- January 2 – Pontormo, Italian painter (b. 1494)
- January 4 – Philip, Duke of Mecklenburg, (b. 1514)
- January 8 – Albert Alcibiades, Margrave of Brandenburg-Kulmbach ("Albert the Warlike"), Prince of Bayreuth (b. 1522)
- March 13 – Louis de Bourbon de Vendôme, French cardinal (b. 1493)
- April 9 – Mikael Agricola, Finnish scholar (b. c. 1510)
- April 24 – Georg Rörer, German theologian (b. 1492)
- April 29 – Lautaro, Mapuche warrior (b. 1534)
- May 18 – John II, Count Palatine of Simmern, Count Palatine of Simmern (1509-1557) (b. 1492)
- June 10 – Leandro Bassano, Italian painter (d. 1622)
- June 11 – King John III of Portugal (b. 1502)
- July 10 – Giovanni Battista Ramusio, Italian geographer (b. 1485)
- July 16 – Anne of Cleves, fourth queen of Henry VIII of England (b. 1515)
- August 1 – Olaus Magnus, Swedish ecclesiastic and writer (b. 1490)
- August 18 – Claude de la Sengle, 48th Grandmaster of the Knights Hospitaller (b. 1494)
- September 1 – Jacques Cartier, French explorer (b. 1491)
- September 13 – John Cheke, English classical scholar and statesman (b. 1514)
- September 15 – Juan Álvarez de Toledo, Spanish Catholic cardinal (b. 1488)
- September 27 – Emperor Go-Nara of Japan (b. 1495)
- October 5 or October 6 – Kamran Mirza, Mughal prince (b. 1509)
- October 20 – Jean Salmon Macrin, French poet (b. 1490)
- October 25 – William Cavendish, English courtier (b. 1505)
- November 19
  - Bona Sforza, queen of Sigismund I of Poland (b. 1494)
  - Maria de' Medici, Italian noble (b. 1540)
- December 6 – Elisabeth of Hesse, Hereditary Princess of Saxony (b. 1502)
- December 13 – Niccolò Fontana Tartaglia, Italian mathematician (b. 1499)
- December 27 – Queen Dangyeong, Korean royal consort (b. 1487)
- date unknown
  - Gonzalo Fernández de Oviedo y Valdés, Spanish historian (b. 1478)
  - Charlotte Guillard, French printer
  - Nicolas de Herberay des Essarts, French translator
  - Geoffrey Glyn, English lawyer
- probable
  - Sebastian Cabot, Italian-born English explorer (b. 1476)
  - Thomas Crecquillon, Flemish composer (b. 1490)
