= 1577 =

1577 in various calendars
- Gregorian calendar: 1577; MDLXXVII
- Ab urbe condita: 2330
- Armenian calendar: 1026; ԹՎ ՌԻԶ
- Assyrian calendar: 6327
- Balinese saka calendar: 1498–1499
- Bengali calendar: 983–984
- Berber calendar: 2527
- English Regnal year: 19 Eliz. 1 – 20 Eliz. 1
- Buddhist calendar: 2121
- Burmese calendar: 939
- Byzantine calendar: 7085–7086
- Chinese calendar: 丙子年 (Fire Rat); 4274 or 4067 — to — 丁丑年 (Fire Ox); 4275 or 4068
- Coptic calendar: 1293–1294
- Discordian calendar: 2743
- Ethiopian calendar: 1569–1570
- Hebrew calendar: 5337–5338
- Hindu calendars
- Vikram Samvat: 1633–1634
- Shaka Samvat: 1498–1499
- Kali Yuga: 4677–4678
- Holocene calendar: 11577
- Igbo calendar: 577–578
- Iranian calendar: 955–956
- Islamic calendar: 984–985
- Japanese calendar: Tenshō 5 (天正５年)
- Javanese calendar: 1496–1497
- Julian calendar: 1577; MDLXXVII
- Korean calendar: 3910
- Minguo calendar: 335 before ROC 民前335年
- Nanakshahi calendar: 109
- Thai solar calendar: 2119–2120
- Tibetan calendar: མེ་ཕོ་བྱི་བ་ལོ་ (male Fire-Rat); 1703 or 1322 or 550 — to — མེ་མོ་གླང་ལོ་ (female Fire-Ox); 1704 or 1323 or 551

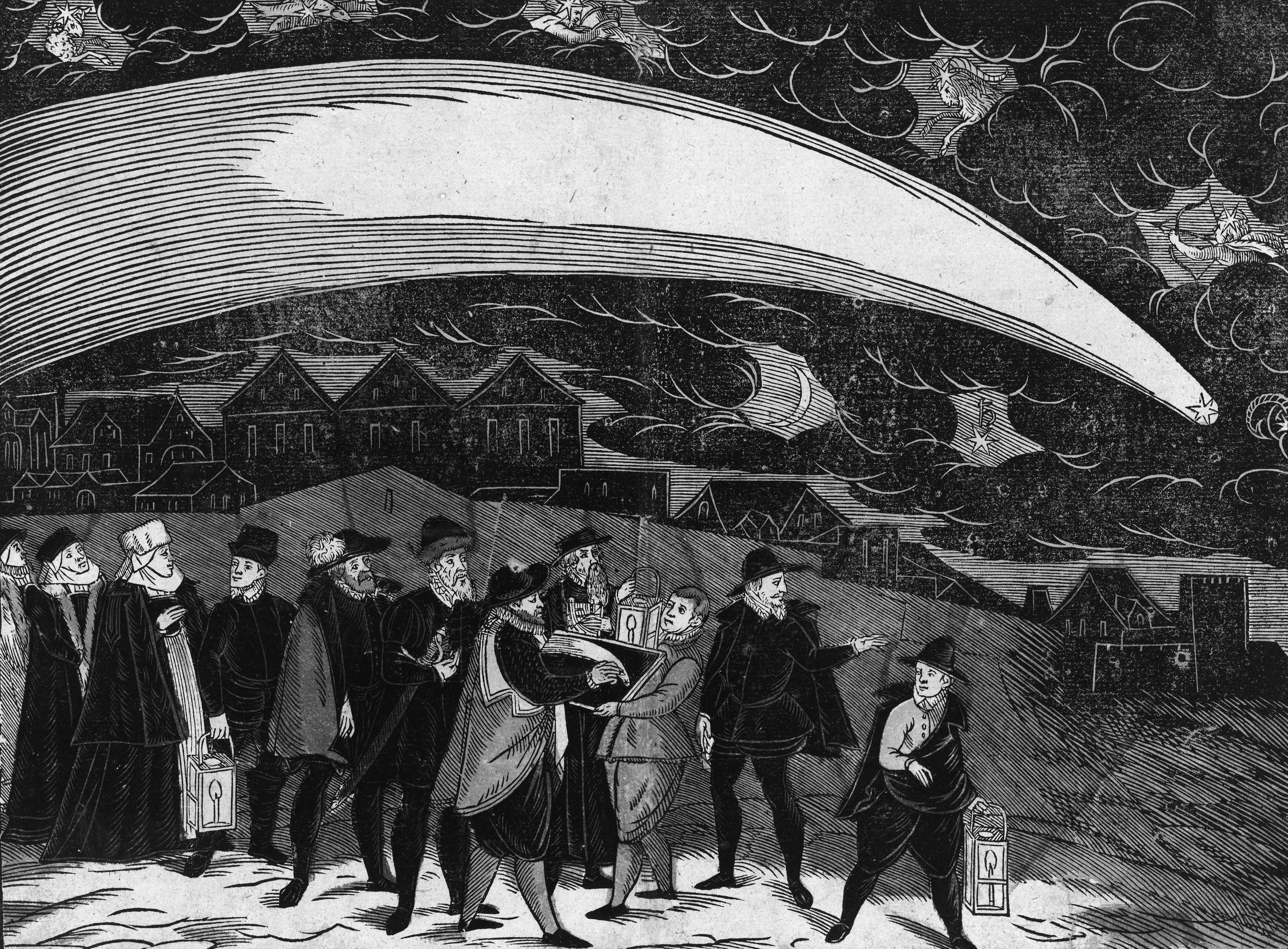
November: the Great Comet of 1577 is visible

Year 1577 (MDLXXVII) was a common year starting on Tuesday of the Julian calendar.

== Events ==
=== January–March ===
- January 9 – The second Union of Brussels is formed, first without the Protestant counties of Holland and Zeeland (which is accepted by King Philip II of Spain), later with the Protestants, which means open rebellion of the whole of the Netherlands.
- February 12 – The "Perpetual Edict", providing for the removal of Spanish troops from what is now the Netherlands, is signed in the city of Marche-en-Famenne in the Spanish Netherlands (now Belgium) by the Spanish Governor-General, Don Juan de Austria and representatives of the Dutch rebellion. The Perpetual Edict will last only five months, before Don Juan begins new attacks on the rebels.
- February 23 – The new Shah of Iran, Ismail II, has most of the advisers of his late father executed, including Prince Ibrahim Mirza.
- March 17 – The Cathay Company is formed, to send Martin Frobisher back to the New World for more gold.

=== April–June ===
- April 17 – Battle of Lubieszów: General Jan Zborowski leads the army of the Polish–Lithuanian Commonwealth in the catastrophic defeat of most of Jan Winkelbruch's 12,000 rebels and mercenaries from the Commonwealth's richest city, Danzig, killing 4,420 of the men and capturing another 5,000 as prisoners. Only 88 of Zborowski's 2,500 troops are killed. The Danzig Rebellion ends at the end of the year.
- May 27 – English explorer Martin Frobisher departs from Blackwall in his flagship, HMS Ayde, along with the ships Gabriel and Michael, to begin the English expedition to North America.
- May 28 – The Bergen Book, better known as the Solid Declaration of the Formula of Concord, one of the Lutheran confessional writings, is published. The earlier version, known as the Torgau Book (1576), had been condensed into an Epitome; both documents are part of the 1580 Book of Concord.
- June 11 – Sebastiano Venier becomes the new Doge of the Republic of Venice, succeeding Alvise Mocenigo, who died on June 4.
- June 12 – The French city of Issoire surrenders and 3,000 of its Protestant Huguenots are massacred by the troops of the French Catholic General Francis, Duke of Anjou, on orders by King Henry III of France. The massacre is carried out 20 months after the October 15, 1575 killing of Catholic residents by Matthieu Merle. Most of Issoire's buildings are torn down, and the royal troops leave an inscription on a pillar, Ici fut Issoire ("Here stood Issoire.")
- June 13 – Mirza Salman Jaberi is appointed as the new Grand Vizier of Persia by Shah Ismail II, replacing Mirza Shokrollah Isfahani.
- June 29 – Mehmed II Giray becomes the new Khan of Crimea for the Ottoman Empire, after the death of his father, Devlet I Giray, from a plague.

=== July–September ===
- July 9 – Ludvig Munk is appointed Governor-General of Norway.
- August 1 – Göran Boije becomes the new Duke of Estonia, ruling what is, at the time, a dominion of the Swedish Empire.
- August 23 – Martin Frobisher ends his expedition to Canada and he and his crew begin the journey back to England on the ships Ayde, Gabriel and Michael.
- September 8 – (11th waning of Tawthalin 939 ME) Min Phalaung, King of Arakan in what is now northern Myanmar and southern Bangladesh on the Bay of Bengal, enters his new palace in dedication ceremonies at the capital at Mrauk U.
- September 17 – The Treaty of Bergerac is signed between Henry III of France and the Huguenots.
- September 23 – The first Inuit to see Europe— Kalicho, Arnaq, and Arnaq's son, Nutaaq— are brought as captives of Martin Frobisher when HMS Gabriel arrived in England at Bristol. All three were captured on Baffin Island, and none of the three survive to the end of the year.

=== October–December ===
- October 19 – In Italy, Giovanni Battista Gentile Pignolo is elected as the new Doge of the Republic of Genoa for a two-year term, replacing Prospero Centurione Fattinanti.
- October 28 – In Flanders (now part of Belgium), two Protestant members of the city council of Ghent, Jan van Hembyze and François van Ryhove, proclaim the Calvinist Republic of Ghent. The stadtholder of Flanders, Philippe III de Croÿ, Duke of Aarschot is arrested, along with the Roman Catholic bishops Martin Rythovius of Ypres and Remi Drieux of Bruges. The Calvinist Republic will exist for seven years until the Spanish conquest of Ghent in 1584.
- November 6 – The first recorded observation from Earth of the Great Comet of 1577 takes place by Aztec astronomers in Mexico, followed by reports from Italy on November 7 and Japan on November 8. Astronomer Tycho Brahe will track the comet from November 13 until January 26 before it departs the Solar System.
- November 13 – In the Battle of Tedorigawa, Uesugi Kenshin's forces decisively defeat the forces of Oda Nobunaga, in what will be Kenshin's last victory before his death the following year.
- November 19 – With defeat coming close in the siege of Shigisan, Matsunaga Hisahide commits suicide.
- December 13 – Francis Drake leaves Plymouth, England, aboard the Pelican, with four other ships and 164 men, on an expedition against the Spanish, along the Pacific coast of the Americas, which will become his circumnavigation.

=== Date unknown ===
- Supposed massacre of the MacDonald inhabitants of the Scottish island of Eigg, by the Clan MacLeod.
- Mehmed Paša Sokolović Bridge over the Drina in Višegrad is completed in the Ottoman Empire.
- The church in San Pedro de Atacama is built, in the Atacama Desert in Chile.
- Casiodoro de Reina publishes his "Declaracion, o confesion de fe", the first and only Spanish confession of faith in the post Reformation period.

== Births ==
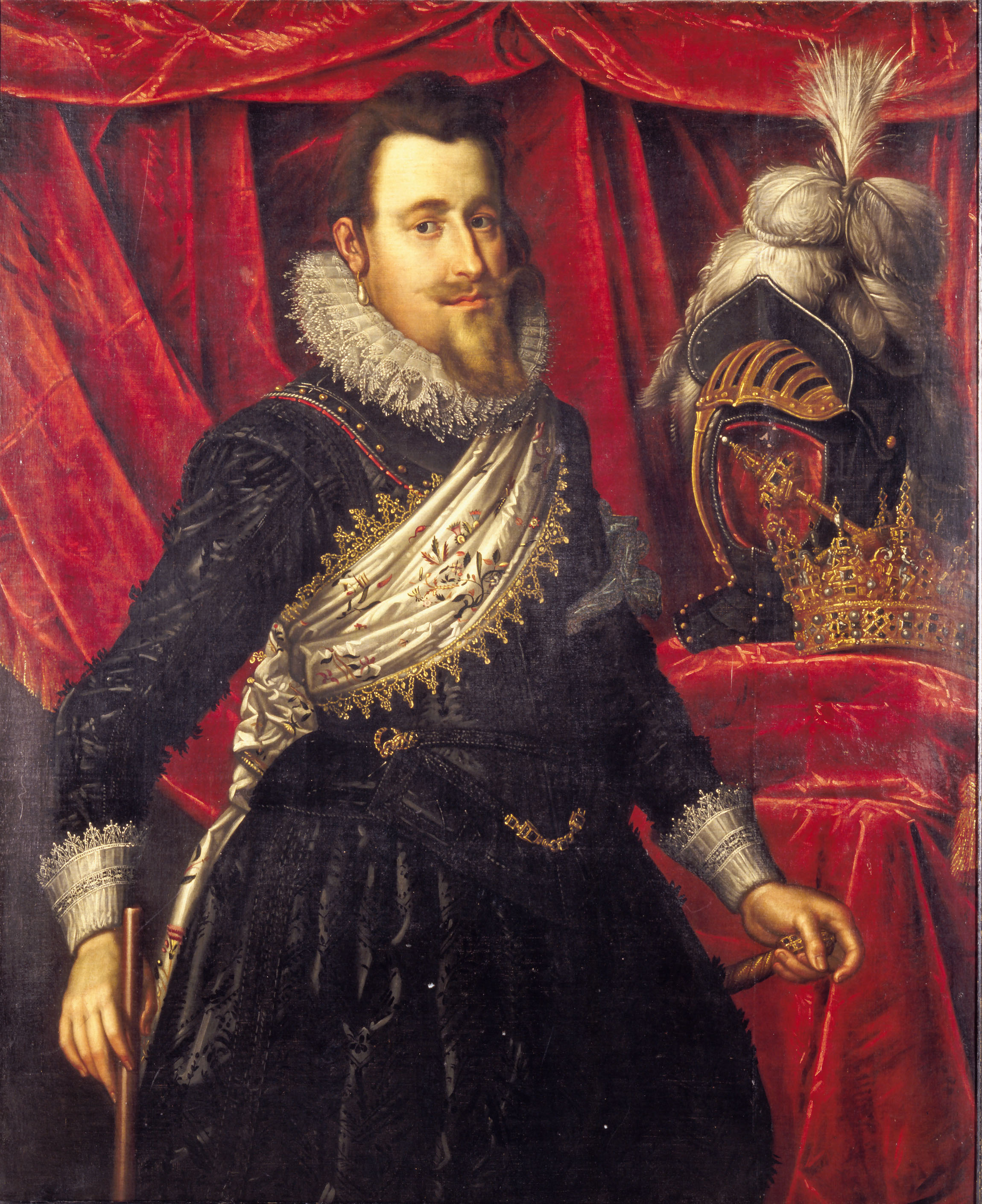
Christian IV of Denmark and Norway

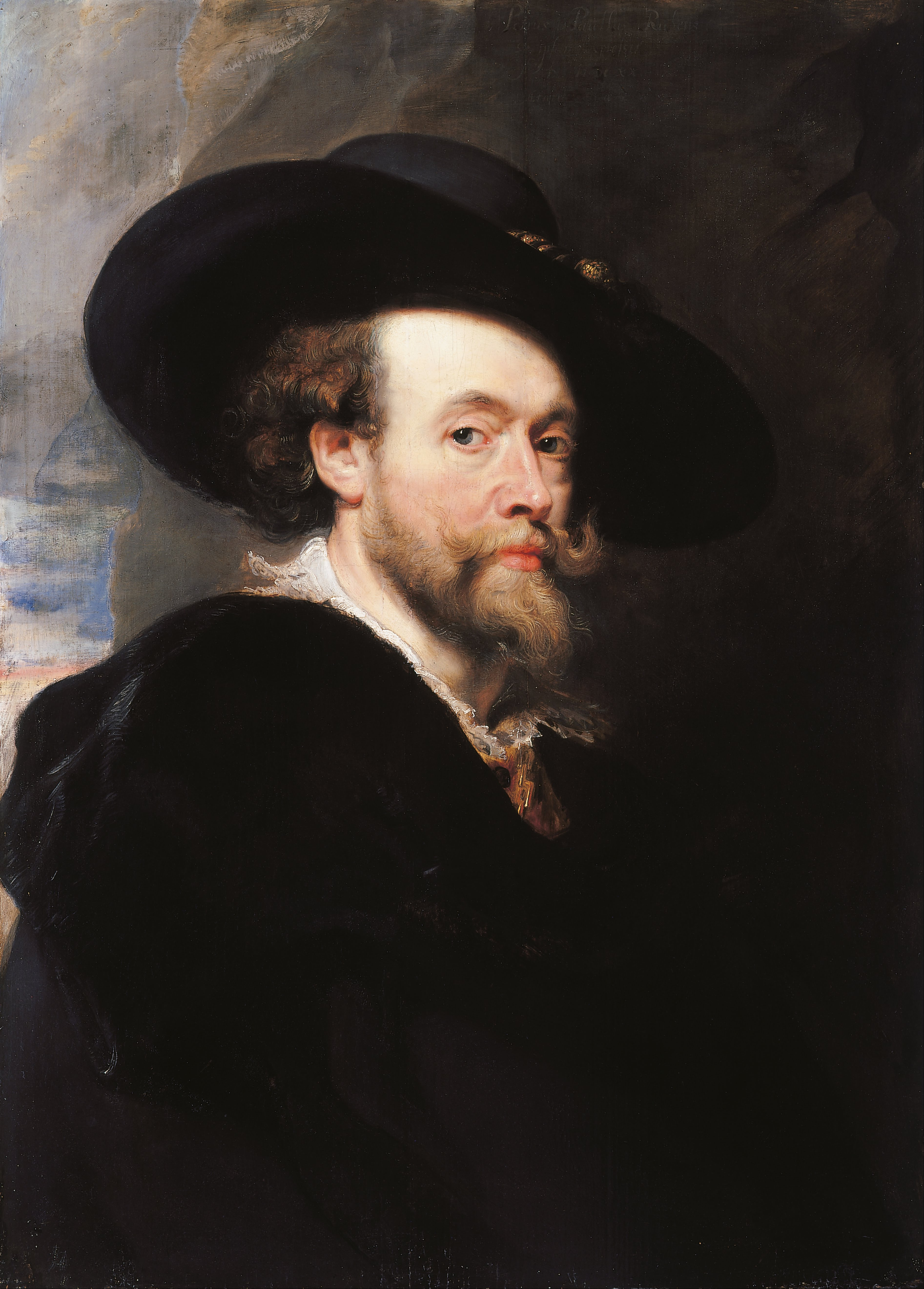
Peter Paul Rubens

- January 9 – Anthony Irby, English politician (d. 1610)
- January 12 – Francesco Stelluti, Italian mathematician (d. 1652)
- January 13 – Hugh Audley, English moneylender/lawyer/philosopher (d. 1662)
- February 5 – Johann Baptist Grossschedel, German noble, alchemist and esoteric author (d. 1630)
- February 6 – Beatrice Cenci, Italian noblewoman who conspired to kill her father (d. 1599)
- February 7 – Francis Walsingham, English Jesuit (d. 1647)
- February 8 – Robert Burton, English scholar at Oxford University (d. 1640)
- February 15 – Jean Riolan the Younger, French anatomist (d. 1657)
- February 17 – Augustus, Duke of Saxe-Lauenburg, German noble (d. 1656)
- February 18 – Roger North, English politician (d. 1651)
- February 22 – Pieter Huyssens, Flemish architect (d. 1637)
- March 1 – Richard Weston, 1st Earl of Portland (d. 1635)
- March 2 – George Sandys, English traveller (d. 1644)
- March 5 – Franciscus Dousa, Dutch classical scholar (d. 1630)
- March 20 – Alessandro Tiarini, Italian Baroque painter of the Bolognese School (d. 1668)
- March 24 – Francis, Duke of Pomerania-Stettin, Bishop of Cammin (d. 1620)
- April 12 – King Christian IV of Denmark (d. 1648)
- April 26 – Countess Elisabeth of Nassau, French noble (d. 1642)
- May 20 – Philip de' Medici, Italian noble (d. 1582)
- May 31 – Nur Jahan, empress consort of the Mughal Empire (d. 1645)
- June 12 – Paul Guldin, Swiss Jesuit mathematician (d. 1643)
- June 28 – Peter Paul Rubens, Flemish painter (d. 1640)
- July 9 – Thomas West, 3rd Baron De La Warr, English governor of Virginia (d. 1618)
- July 21
  - Anne de Montafié, Countess of Clermont-en-Beauvaisis, French countess (d. 1644)
  - Adam Willaerts, Dutch painter (d. 1664)
- August 11 (bapt.) – Barnaby Potter, English Bishop of Carlisle (d. 1642)
- September 1 – Scipione Borghese, Italian Catholic cardinal and art collector (d. 1633)
- September 8 – Otto Heurnius, Dutch physician and philosopher (d. 1652)
- September 24 – Louis V of Hesse-Darmstadt from 1596 to 1626 (d. 1626)
- October 3 – Tobie Matthew, English Member of Parliament, later Catholic priest (d. 1655)
- October 6 – Ferdinand of Bavaria (d. 1650)
- October 11 – Jørgen Lunge, Danish politician (d. 1619)
- October 17
  - Cristofano Allori, Italian portrait painter (d. 1621)
  - Dmitry Pozharsky, Russian prince (d. 1642)
- November 2 – John Bridgeman, British bishop (d. 1652)
- November 4 – François Leclerc du Tremblay (d. 1638)
- November 10 – Jacob Cats, Dutch poet, jurist and politician (d. 1660)
- November 24 – Louis Philip, Count Palatine of Guttenberg, Palatinate-Veldenz (d. 1601)
- November 25 – Piet Pieterszoon Hein, Dutch admiral and privateer for the Dutch Republic (d. 1629)
- December 8 – Mario Minniti, Italian artist active in Sicily after 1606 (d. 1640)
- December 20 – Antonio Brunelli, Italian composer and theorist (d. 1630)
- December 25 – Petrus Kirstenius, German physician and orientalist (d. 1640)
- December 27 – William Howard, 3rd Baron Howard of Effingham, English politician and Baron (d. 1615)
- date unknown
  - Christoph Besold, German jurist (d. 1638)
  - Giacomo Cavedone, Italian painter (d. 1660)
  - Robert Cushman, English Plymouth Colony settler (d. 1625)
  - Kobayakawa Hideaki, Japanese samurai and warlord (d. 1602)
  - William Noy, English lawyer and politician (d. 1634)
  - Samuel Purchas, English travel writer (d. 1626)
  - Meletius Smotrytsky, Ruthenian religious activist and author, who developed Church Slavonic grammar (d. 1633)
  - Gerhard Johann Vossius, German classical scholar and theologian (d. 1649)

== Deaths ==
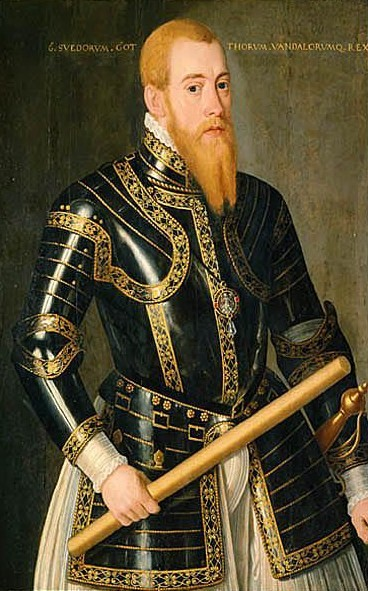
Eric XIV of Sweden

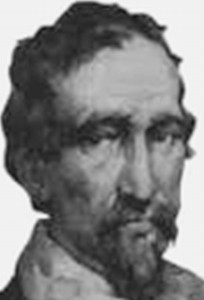
Saint Cuthbert Mayne

- January 23 – Nicolas, Duke of Mercœur, Roman Catholic bishop (b. 1524)
- February – Adam von Bodenstein, Swiss alchemist and physician (b. 1528)
- February 26 – King Erik XIV of Sweden (b. 1533)
- March 23 – Charles II of Baden-Durlach (b. 1529)
- April 13 – Konrad Hubert, German theologian and hymnwriter (b. 1507)
- May – Richard Aertsz, Dutch painter (b. 1482)
- May 5 – Viglius, Dutch statesman (b. 1507)
- May 31 – García Álvarez de Toledo, 4th Marquis of Villafranca, Spanish noble and admiral (b. 1514)
- June 4 – Alvise I Mocenigo, Doge of Venice (b. 1507)
- June 7 – Daniel, Count of Waldeck (b. 1530)
- June 12 – Orazio Samacchini, Italian painter (b. 1532)
- July 23 – Scipione Rebiba, Italian cardinal (b. 1504)
- July 26 – Blaise de Lasseran-Massencôme, seigneur de Montluc, Marshal of France (b. 1502)
- August 12 – Thomas Smith, English scholar and diplomat (b. 1513)
- September 7 – Infanta Maria of Guimarães (b. 1538)
- September 27 – Diego de Covarrubias y Leyva, Spanish jurist and archbishop of Cuenca (b. 1512)
- October 3 – Henry IX of Waldeck (b. 1531)
- October 7 – George Gascoigne, English poet (b. c. 1525)
- October 10 – Maria of Portugal, Duchess of Viseu (b. 1521)
- November 19 – Matsunaga Hisahide, Japanese warlord (b. 1508)
- November 29 – Cuthbert Mayne, English saint (b. 1543)
- December 4 – Achilles Gasser, German physician and astrologer (b. 1505)
- December 18 – Anna of Saxony, princess consort of Orange (b. 1544)
