= Luca Spinola (1489–1579) =

Doge of the Republic of Genoa

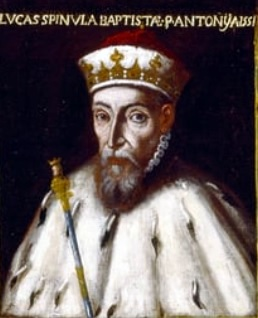

57th Doge of the Republic of Genoa
- In office 4 January 1551 – 4 January 1553
- Preceded by: Gaspare Grimaldi Bracelli
- Succeeded by: Giacomo Promontorio

Personal details
- Born: 1489 Genoa, Republic of Genoa
- Died: 1579 (aged 89–90) Genoa, Republic of Genoa

Luca Spinola (Genoa, 1489 - Genoa, 1579) was the 57th Doge of the Republic of Genoa.

== Biography ==
Luca Spinola was elected to the dogal title on 4 January 1551, the twelfth in biennial succession and the fifty-seventh in republican history, a position he held until 4 January 1553. Among his undertakings and actions in his mandate, in addition to having hired troops of mercenaries from all over Italy for the defense and security of the Republic, there was the purchase for 5,000 Genoese pounds of the "hovels" of the ancient quarters of Maddalena, San Francesco di Castelletto and Fontane Marose and then resold them to the wealthiest noble families of the time that sumptuous residential buildings will build there. In addition, during its two - year period, construction work began on the Basilica of Santa Maria Assunta, Genoa, work by Galeazzo Alessi.

At the end of the dogate he held the position of perpetual prosecutor of the Republic and worked in other state duties, between these two embassies in Rome and France. In 1566 he was injured surviving an assassination attempt, commissioned by Giovanni Stefano Lercari, son of the future doge Giovanni Battista Lercari, that by mistake or exchange of person killed the ex doge Agostino Pinelli Ardimenti.

Upon his death in Genoa in 1579, by his express desire he was buried in the sepulcher of the Spinola family at the Benedictine church of Santa Caterina, in the altar dedicated to San Benedetto.

== See also ==
- Republic of Genoa
- Doge of Genoa
- House of Spinola
