= Bayinnaung's Bell Inscription =

Burmese and Mon language inscription

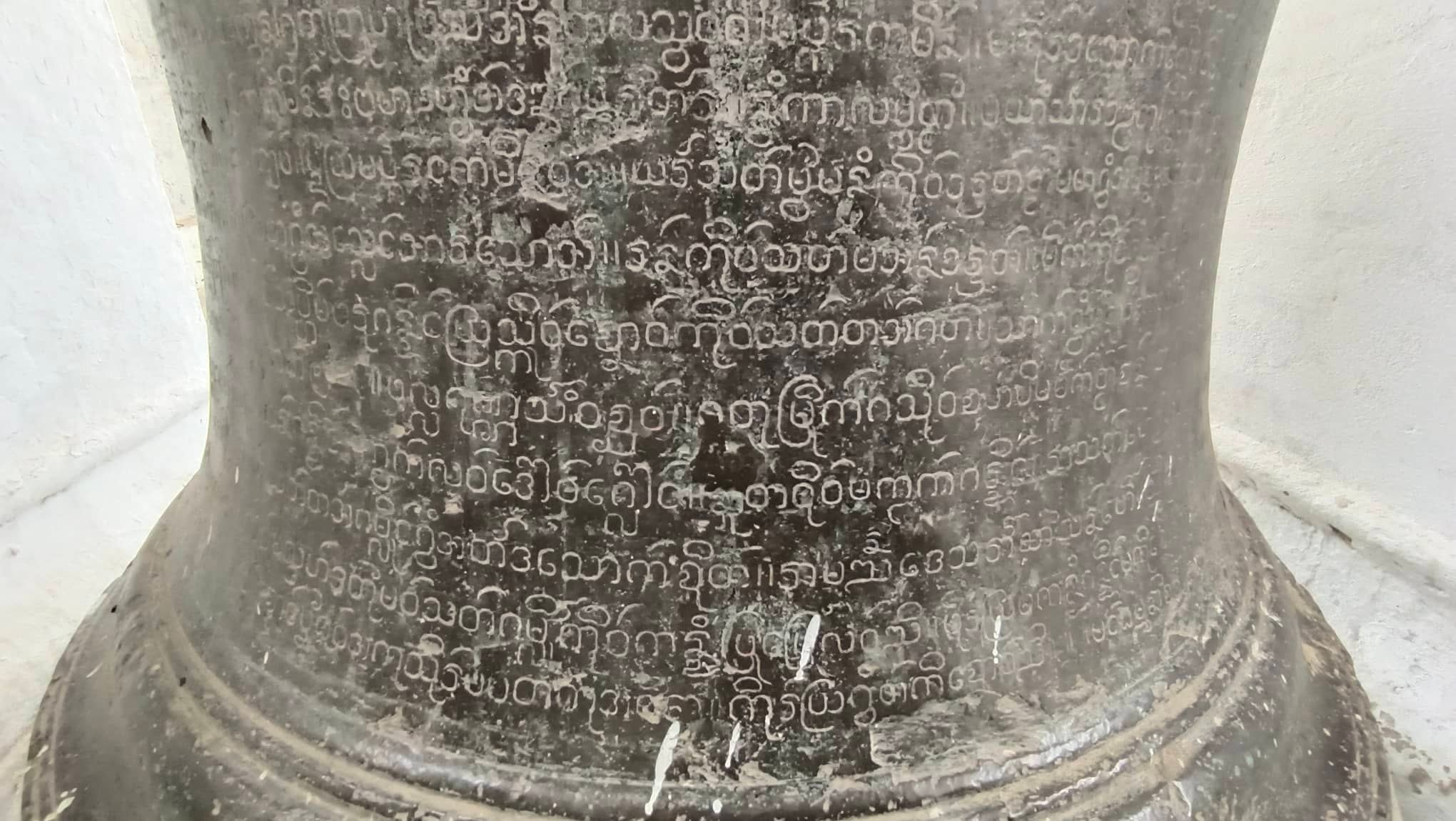
- Author: Man Dhamma (မင်းဓမ္မ)
- Original title: ပဲခူးမှ ဘုရင့်နောင် ခေါင်းလောင်းစာ
- Translator: Nai Bee Htaw Monzel to English
- Language: Burmese, Mon
- Series: Burmese chronicles
- Genre: Chronicle, History
- Publication date: 1554
- Publication place: Kingdom of Burma
- English publication date: 1838, July 2022

Bayinnaung's Bell Inscription is a bilingual inscription found on a bell which was cast by Emperor Bayinnaung of Toungoo dynasty and hung in the middle of a road in Bago, Burma (Myanmar), during the rule of king Bayinnaung from 1554 to 1581. It is written in Burmese and Mon. The bell was first taken to Mrauk U, Arakan, Burma. In 1825 it was taken to India by Bheem Singh and it was later hanged in a Hindu temple, Bhim Ghanta (also called 84 Mann Temple), QJJ9+J77, Bakner, Uttar Pradesh 207123, India. This bell is one attributed to King Bayinnaung. Another known example is the bell at Shwezigon Pagoda, which bears inscriptions in Burmese, Mon, and Pāli.

== Print publications ==
The inscriptions were first translated and published in English in 1838 in the Journal of the Asiatic Society No. 76. April. But the copied of the texts and the translations were much mistaken. In 2022 Nai Bee Htaw Monzel read and translated the Mon part and it was published in Amartdein Journal Vol. 14 in July 2022.

== The text and English translation by Nai Bee Htaw Monzel ==
{1} ။ ။ ပ္ဍဲဘဒြကဝ်ဝွံအ် တဳလမနွေံာပိုန် ကျာ်တြယ်ကုက္ကုသန်။ တ္လဳမနွံပိုန် ကျာ်တြဲကောနာဂီု။ တဳလမနွံပိုန် ကျာ်တြဲကဿပ။ သီုသာသနာ ကလိလောန်တုဲ {2}  တ္လဳမနွံပိုန် ကျာ်တြဲမဟာဂေါတမ။ မက္တိုဝ်ဒဟ်။

{1} ။ ။ On this Bhadrakalpa (world) after the Lord Buddha Kukkuson (Kukusanda), the Lord Buddha Konāgium (Konagamana), the Lord Buddha Kassapa (Kasyapa) and their religions were passed the Lord Buddha Mahā Gotama (Gautama) appeared.

နူစၞာံ တ္လဳမနွံပိုန် ကျာ်တြဲ မှာဂေါတမ မပပရိနိဗ္ဗာန် သာသနာ ၂၀၉၅ စၞာံ ကလိလောန်အာတုဲ။ ပ္ဍဲသက္ကရာံ ၉၁၃ တ္လဉး မနွံဂုန်ဇမၞာံ{3}  ပိ။ မတွဟ်ဂး တျာဂဂုန်။ နွံကိုဝ်ကွေတ် မဟွံအ်ဒဍဝ် သတျဂုန် တိတ်ပါဲတုဲ ညံင်္ စရှိတ် မတဴတၟံကီု။ သုရဂုန်။ နွံဂၞ်ု င်္ညံဆုအိန်ဒက္ခဳ မဟွံအ်က္ဆဳကီု။

After the Lord Buddha Mahā Gotama attained parinirvana 2095 years passed, In the Sakka year 913 (=CE 1552) a king who with three qualities, included Tyā Guna; being in faith without change, Satya Guna; after refutation like Sarit being on stone, Sura Guna; having a quality like indakhilo tree that was unmovable,

မနွံမ်သတ္တိပိ။ မတွဟ်ဂး မတြဳသတ္တိ။ မနွံ[ဂသပ်မခိုဟ်တုဲ]{4} ဥဿဟသတ္တိ။ မနွံဝဳ မစိုပ်ဒတုဲ။ ပဘူဝသတ္တိ။ မနွံသတ္တိ မကိုဝ်ဒန် ကိုဝ်ညး မဒးပဗွဲဓဝ်။

having three kinds of courage, included Mattrî Satti; having courage which is a good intention, Ussaha Satti; having diligence which is a completion, Pabhūwa Satti; having courage which is punished for the justice,

မဆိုက်ပဒက် ပ္ဍဲဥပါယ်ပန်။ မတွဟ်ဂး သာမဥပါဲ။ မဆိုက်ဗဒက် ပ္ဍဲမ[ပ္တုန်ပ္အာ]ညး။ ဒဏ္ဍဥပါဲ။ မဆိုက်ဗဒ{5} က် ပ္ဍဲမပေါက်ပၞာန် ကုညး။ ဒါနဥပါဲ။ မဆိုက်ဗဒက် ပ္ဍဲမကိုရ်လာပ်သကာ ကုညး။ ဘေဒဥပါဲ။ မဆိုက်ဗဒက် ပ္ဍဲမပလီုပါပမိတ်ညး။

being qualified in the four stratagems included Sama-upaya; qualification of keeping calm, Danda-upaya; qualification of attacking others, Dāna-upaya; qualification of distributing favors to others, Bheda-upaya; qualification of destroyed others’ evil-friends,

မနွံဒြရ္ဟတ်မသုန်။ မတွဟ်ဂး အဘိဇာတျဗလ။ ဒြရ္ဟတ် မနွံဂကူ။ [ဒသ]{6} ဗလ။ နွံ ဒရ္ဟတ်ကလောည္ဒာတ် သ္ကံစွးမဂၠိုင်္ ။ ဘောဂဗလ။ မနွံဒြရ္ဟတ်ပိုန်ဟာန် စိင်က္ဆေဟ် ဒြပ် ရတ်မဂၠိုင်္ ။ ဗာဟုဗလ။ နွံဒရ္ဟတ်ကွတ်သပါတ် မလောန်နူညး။ ညာဏဗလ။ နွံဒရ္ဟတ်ပညာ မတီဒွးမုတ်။

Having five kinds of strength, included Abhijātya-bala; having a strength of nobility, Dasa-bala, having a strength of numerous relatives and followers, Bhoga-bala; having a strength of the rich, possessed many elephants, horses, and properties, Bhāhu-bala; having a strength which is skillful more than others, Ñāna-bala; having a strength which is intelligent that knowing right and wrong,

ဗဝဝ်ဂုန်မဂလိုင်္ {7} ဝွံအ် ဍောက်င်္ပေတုဲ။ ကမိန်ဍုင်ကေတုမတဳ။ သရေခေတ္တရာ။ အရိမဒ္ဒပူရ။ သာယာဝဒဳ။ ပရန်တပ္ပ။ တိင်ထွင်္ ။ စင်္လ။ ကမန်င်္ဍုတအ်ဝွံအ် ပ္လောပ်လက်တဲတုဲ။

After having entirely adequate of those qualities, (the king) conquered all the kingdoms of Ketumatî, Srikhettarā, Arimaddapūra, Sāyāwadî, Parantappa, Tintwan, Salan.

ဟိုတ်စိုတ် သၟိက်ယောက် သာသနာ။ သၟီပြန် မဒဟ်ဒေံ တ္လဉး မကိုဝ်သဒိုဓမၟ{8}ရာဇာ ကိုဝ်ပသၟီဗိုဝ်။ သၟီဗကာံ၊ သၟီသာယာဝဒဳ၊ သၟီပရန်[တပ်]။ သၟီတဝ်င်္ထွ။ သၟီစင်္လ။ ပၞာန်င်္ဒၠု သီုဒရ္ဟတ်စလ င်္က္ၜ ရာဲလှေ လှဴဂါ။ သဍဝ် သီုဗဵုဗလး ကိုဝ်ဇက်စိုဟ်င်္တၠု နူင်္ဍုပြန်။ ဇကုတ္လဉး တဴဒေါ်၊ ဒေံတ္လဉး သရဳဇဲယကျဝ်င်္ထ မစမတၟ၊ ဒေံ{9}တ္လဉး င်္မရာဲသဳဂသူ မစကေတုမတဳ ညးၜါဝွံ တဴလပါက်သ္တုံ၊ ကွံန်တ္လဉး င်္မရာဲကျဝ်ဇွာ။ သၟီသရိဇဲယနူရထာ မစ[ရမၠ]။ သၟီင်္မရာဲင်္သခယာ မစကောလယ၊ ညးပိဝွံ တဴလပါက်ဇွိ၊

Due to serving the religion, (the king) let his brother the lord of Prome, Sadow Dammarājā, be a commander in chief, the lord of Bagan, the lord of Sāyāwatî, the lord of Parantap, the lord of Tawthwan, the lord of Salan, boat-army with ship and boat of state, together with soldiers and chiefs marched from Prome. The king himself was in the middle. The king brother Min Sarî Jauya Kyaw Htin the lord of Mattam, the king brother Min Rai Sîgasū the lord of Ketumatî, those two persons were on the right-hand side. The king's son Min Rai Kyaw Jwā, the lord of Dala Sari Jauya Nurathā, and the lord of Kolaya Min Rai Sankhayā, those three persons were on the left-hand side.

ဂိတုစဲ ၅ မၟံက် ရာသဳမန် င်္အသာ တ္ငဲအဒိုတ် (10) တ္ငဲတိုန် - - း။ လက်မိဟ် တြယ်[အတ္ထကဒဳ] သီုပၞာန်စိံ ပၞာန်က္ဆေံ ပၞာန်တောက် သရာဲသခက် ဗိုဝ်လဗး မတုပ် ကုစိုတ် ဇက်စိုဟ်င်္တၠု င်္ဍုကေတုမတဳ။

On the 5th waxing day of Chaitra, Pisces, Aansā, Sunday, after the sun rises – –, Lakmih, Tray, Atathakadî, the army of elephants, cavalry, infantry with the masses of soldiers and military commanders who had the same mission marched from Prome.

ဂိတုစဲ ပိစဝေက် ရာသဳမိန် င်္အသာ ၁၅ တ္ငဲ ၀။ တ္လဉး စိုပ်ဗစး။ သၟီဨက{11}ရာံင်္ဍုမန်တုံ။ ပၞာန်စိံ ပၞာန်က္ဆေံ ပၞာန်တောက် သရာဲ သခက် ဗိုဝ်လဗး။ သီုဒရ္ဟတ် ဇက်င်္တၠု ဒဵုစိုပ်ဗစး။ တ္ငဲဂဟ် ဨကရာံၜါ [ဒဝ်]စနေဟ်။ သၟီဨကရာံင်္ဍုမွန်။ ဍောက်စိံစေတ်င်္ချ။ သီုဒရ္ဟတ် ဗတိုက်ပၞာန်တ္လဉး။ ဗမာ {12} သေံ သီုပအိုတ် ပေက်ဒသိုတ်အာ။

On the 3rd waning day of Chaitra, Pisces, Aansā 15, Saturday the king arrived with a force at Ba Cah. The king of Monland also marched with the army of elephants, cavalry, and infantry with the masses of soldiers and military commanders and arrived with a force at Ba Cah. On that day the two kings fought each other. The king of Monland mounted on an elephant Cet Chan and fought the king's army. All Burman and Shan (soldiers) ran away.

ဇကုတ္လဉး သီုမငွာံက္ဍိုပ်စိံသို[င် တ္လဒတဴဒၟံင်္] ဟွံအ်က္ဆဳ ဨယ်ရသ္ဂောံယောက် သာသနာ ပ္ဍဲင်္ဍုမွန်။ ပၞာန်ဝွံအ် ကိုရ်ဂွံအ်ဇၞး။ အိငဟ်အဒိဋ္ဌာန်တုဲ။ တ္လဉးဗျိုဝ်စိင် ကိုဝ် ဨကရာံင်္ဍုမွန်{13} ဥပေါသတ္ထ မယောက်စေင်္ချ။ တမ္အိပ်သြလောတ်။ ဒြင်ဥပေါသတ္ထကဝ် မွဲဟတ်သာံဒံင်္ ။ စေတ်င်္ချ သီုဨကရာံင်္ဍုမန်။ ဒလာက်က္တိုဝ် ကရဴဒဴ။ တ္လဉးမဂွံဇၞးပၞာန်ဇၞော်။ မကလိဂွံအ် ကမိန်ဍုင်သြဳ{14} ဟံင်္ သာဝတဳ။ မနွံပနှဳရးမွံန်ပိစွံအ်။ မတွဟ်ဂး ပါစိနရး။ မဇ္ဆိမရး။ ပစ္ဆိမရး။

The king remained on the head of the elephant without moving. “If I am the person who has to serve the religion in Monland, may I get the victory in this war!” that the king made a vow, then, the king fought elephant with the king of Monland. (The king's elephant) Uposattha lifted Cet Chan and pushed. (Cet Chan) fell. Uposattha's tusk was broken off one cubit. Cet Chan and the king of Monland got up and ran away. The king victoried over the great battle and conquered the kingdom of Hamsawatî which was an area with three Mon regions: Pācina region, Majchima region and Pacchima region.

အမာတ်ဒကိုပ်ပၞာန်ဇမၞော်သမတ် ပ္လောပ်လင်္ကတဲတုဲ။ ကမ္လတ်ဒမ္လသတြုတမ မတွဟ်ဂး [ဒဝ်]ဇလ တးဝးက္လေံ{15} တုဲ။ အခေါန်ဖလှာ မဟဒဟ် ပဗွဲဓဝ်။ မတုပ်တဴရဴဆုဂျိ ကိုရ်လပေါက်က္လေံအ် ဗအိုတ်တုဲ၊ ဒြပ်စေတဳယသန္တက။ ဓမၟသန္တက။ သင်္ဃသန္တက။ မတုပ်တဴရဴ က[လွောင်္ ဗသဲမဍာဲ]။ အမာတ်ဒကိုပ်{16}  ပၞာန်ဇမၞောက်သမတ် ဟွောအ်ကိုရ်စ။ ဇကုလွေဝ် ဟဂွောအ်နှဴ။

(The king) put ministers, high and low rank of military men under his power. Thieves, robbers, and enemies that like a thorn were cleared. Unlawful taxes like poison trees were removed. The pagodas’ properties, the Dhammas’ properties, and the monasteries’ properties that like a hot iron would not be taken/taxed by ministers, high and low rank of military men. Even the king did not take it.

ပ္ဍဲသတ်ဂမ္လိုင် မနွံစိုတ် မင်္သ္ဇုဂွု ညံင်္ ထာင်္ ပ္ကဴကုသန် မဂွုစ္အးကိုမ်။ ပ္ဍဲမကိုရ်စၞောဝ် ကုသတ်ဂမ္လိုင် ညံင်္ သၟီယီု မပ္တုဲသင်္ရ မဟွံအ်စွး{17} ဗောက်ကီုမ်။ ပ္ဍဲမကိုဝ်ပိုန်ဟာန် စာသံက် ဒဳင်္ဒ္လု ကိုရ်အမာတ် ဒကိုပ်ပၞာန် ဇမၞောံ သမတ် ညံင်္ သၟီဂတုမတိုန် အရံင်္ လျးသမန်စၞံင်္ ဇမၞေံာက်သမတ်ကီု။ ပ္ဍဲမင်္ဒုသဇိုင် သတ်ဂမ္လိုင် ညံင်္ တိဇ{18} နောက် မင်္ဒုသဇိုင်သတ် မဟွံအ်ရုဲစဟ်ကီု။ ပ္ဍဲမကိုရ် ဒသောက်က္တောဝ် မတ် ကွံန်ဂြကူတြုဟ်ဗြဴ ညံင်္ အိန်တလသွဝ်ၜါ မင်္ပ္ကင်္ရကမိန်။ မကိုရ် ဒသောက်က္တောဝ် မတ်ဒေဝတဴတြုဟ်ဗြဴကိုမ်။ {19} တိုင်ဓဝ်သၟီတမ္လာ ဟဂွံအ်ပလီုတုဲ။ ပဗွဲဓဝ်င်္ဟေ ကမိန်င်္ဍုၐြဳဟံသာဝတဳ ကွံမ်ကု ကမိန်ရးဗမာ မဟွံအ်[ဒဍဝ်ဒရိ]တဴရ]။

(The king) has a clean mind like a Kuson flower to all being. When (he) gives a judicial decision, (it is) like the king of hell doing his work without leaving behind. When (he) gives property, position to minister, high and low rank of military men, (it is) like the moon rising and big and small stars are shining. He takes responsibility for all being like the earth bearing all life without discrimination. He gives happiness of ears and eyes to men and women citizens like the Lord Indra rules his two realms and gives happiness of ears and eyes to men and women celestial being. He did not destroy any rule and custom from former kings, and he rules the kingdom of Hamsawatî and kingdom of Burma peacefully.

နွံကာလမွဲတ္ငဲ။ ပယာံသာရဒဥတု။ ဒၟံင်တဴ လတူ သနာဒသောက် စို{20}တ် မစိုန်သ္ကီုမ်တဴ ကွံမ်ကုဓဝ်သဒ္ဓါ။ သဳလ။ စာဂ။ သာက်ဝွံအ် တ္လဉးက္ဆပ်။ ပ္ဍဲဨယ် မင်္ပ္ကရင် ကမိန်ဝွံအ်။ ယရဴသတ်မွဲ မနွံကိုဝ် ဒရ္ဟတ် တ္ငဲမဟဂွံအ်စၞောဝ် သ္ဂောအ်လမိင်ဨယ်။ ဨယ်သ္ဂောအ်{21} ကိုဝ်စၞောဝ်။ ယရဴသတ်မွဲ မအန်ဒရ္ဟတ်။ တ္ငဲမဟဂွံအ်စၞောဝ် လမိင်ဨယ် ဟဂွံအ် သ္လေင်အာရသောအ်။

One day on the month of Sārada (the king) in his mind of generosity, precepts, and charity he thought that when I rule this kingdom, any of person who is strong/in power when they do not get justice, they inform me, and I give them justice. Any person who is weak/not in power when they do not get justice, (they) cannot inform me, they lose.

ရန်ကိုဝ် သတ်မအန် ဒရ္ဟတ်။ မိက်ကိုဝ်ဂွံအ်စၞောဝ်။ ဂနှိင်မွဲ ဨယ်သောန် ဨယ်{22} ကွက်လဝ် ဒေါဝ်ဂ္လောင်။ ယရဴသတ်မွဲ မဟဂွံအ်စၞောဝ်။ င်္တ္လုတိုက်ဂနှိင်သမ္တိမ်ဗရုဂနှိင် ဨယ်သ္ကိုဝ်စၞောဝ် ကိုဝ်သတ်တအ်ဂဟ်။ သာက်ဝွံအ် တ္လဉးက္ဆပ်တုဲ။ သိုမ်စိုတ် မနွံကြုန်နှာ {23} မမိက်ဗလး တဒေါက်သတ်။ နသ္လာက်။ မနွံဗၞတ်လ္ၚိမ်ဗသာ။ း။

For person who are weak/ not in power, due to give them justice, I will cast a bell and hang it in the middle of a road. Anyone who did not get justice, they come and strike the bell. The sound of which reaching me, I will give them the justice. That the king thought. With the mind of sympathy and want to release people from suffering (he cast a bell) with a thousand vis of bronze.

ပ္ဍဲသက္ကရာတ် ၉(၁၄) ။ ဖလ္လဂုဏ္ဏင်္သံဝစ္ဆဝ်။ ဂတုမြိုက်ဂသိုဝ် စသ်ပိမမံက် တ္ငဲစန်။ ဘဒြာတိတ္ထဳ လက်ဓနု တ္ငဲ{24} တိုန်တုဲ ပိနာဍဳ ၜါပါတ် တြိင်္ယ ဗြဘတိ နဝင် ဗုဒ္ဓဝါ။ တ္လဉး ကိုဝ်သောန်ဂနှိင် ကွက်လဝ် ဒေါဝ်ဂ္လောင်။

In the Sakka year 9(14)၊ Phālguna Sanwachaw, the thirteenth waxing day of Mārgasira, Monday, Bhadrātitthî, Lakdhanu, after rising of the sun 3 hours two Pāt, Triyan, Brabhati, Nawan, Buddhawā, the king let cast a bell and hang it in the middle of a road.

နူတဝိုဝ် မကွက်ဂနှိင်။ ရာသတ် မဟဂွံအ်စၞောဝ် အာတိုက်ဂနှိင်{25} သမ္တီဗရုဂနှိင်။ တ္လဉး ဂွံအ်ကိုဝ်စၞောဝ် ကုသတ်ဂမ္လိုင်။ ပဝိုင်နူဂဟ် သတ်တအ်ဂမ္လိုင် ဂွံအ်တဴ ဒသောက်စိုတ်။ ရာမန္ညဒေသ ရာင်္ ဆာဲသန်င်္ဟေ။ သၟီဨကရာတ်မင်္ပ္ကရင်ကမိ{26}န် င်္ဍုသြဳင်္ဟံသာဝတဳ။

From the time of the bell was hang, when people did not get justice (they) strike the bell, the sound of which has been heard by (the king). The king can give justice to people. From then on people have got happiness. Rāmanñdesa has certainly prospered. The king rules the kingdom of Srî Hamsawatî.

ပဗွဲကြဴ။ ဂနှိင်ဝွံအ် လီုပြိုဝ်ဒၞတ်ဒကုတ်။ ရန်ကိုဝ် မသ္ဒဟ်ဒတုဲမဝ် သတ်ဂမ္လိုင်္ ကနှံပြုင်္ပြေလဝ်ညိ။ ဖိုရ်ဨယ်မကနှံ မကိုင်္ စၞောဝ်ကိုဝ်သတ္တအ်ဝွံအ်။ ပ္ဍဲအနာ{27}ဂတ် နဗရုဒေသနာညာန် မတုပ်တဴရဴ ဗရုဂနှဳ။ သံဂမ္လိုင်္ မတဴပ္ဍဲဘုံပိ မဟဂွံအ်စၞောဝ် ပ္ဍဲဓဝ်အကုသိုရ် မပတံကု အဝိဇာ။ ကိုရ်ဨယ်ဂွံအ်[က္လိ]စၞောဝ်ညိ။ ။ ။ မင်ဓမၟနာဲစင်္ရ

Later, if this bell is broken, for the benefit of people let repair it. The benefit of what I have made it and giving justice to people, in the future, with the sound of teaching like the sound of a bell, all being in the three worlds who did not get law/Dhamma and living in sin such as ignorance, may I get law/justice. Man Dhamma, the writer.
