= Bunroku =

Period of Japanese history (1592–1596)

Bunroku (文禄) was a Japanese era name (年号, nengō; "year name") after Tenshō and before Keichō. This period spanned the years from December 1592 to October 1596. The reigning emperor of Japan was Go-Yōzei-tennō (後陽成天皇).

== Change of era ==
- 1592 Bunroku gannen (文禄元年): The era name was changed. The previous era ended and a new one commenced in Tenshō 20.

== Events of the Bunroku era ==
- 1592 (Bunroku 1): Toyotomi Hideyoshi invades Korea (Bunroku no Eki), also known as Bunroku Keichō no Eki.
- 1592 (Bunroku 1): Ogasawara Sadayori claims to have discovered the Bonin Islands; and the territory was granted to him as a fief by Toyotomi Hideyoshi.
- 1592 (Bunroku 1): Silver coins called Bunroku-tsūhō were minted to pay Hideyoshi's troops. The 23.25 mm diameter coins weighed 1 momme (approximately 3.75 g). Copper coins were issued at the same time, but none are known to have survived.
- 1593 (Bunroku 2): Toyotomi Hideyori is born to Hideyoshi's mistress Yodo-Dono—an infant son and possible heir.
- 1595 (Bunroku 4): Toyotomi Hidetsugu loses his position and power.
- 1589-1595: An agrarian reform (Bunroku no Kenchi) initiated by Hideyoshi; a general census of the population and a national survey.

== Notes ==
Preceded by Tenshō (天正)	Era or nengō Bunroku (文禄); 1592–1596	Succeeded by Keichō (慶長)
