= Giacomo Promontorio =

Doge of the Republic of Genoa

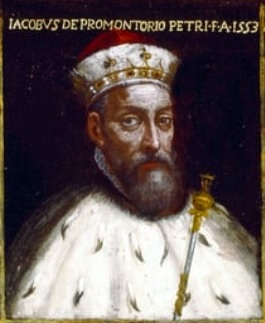

58th Doge of the Republic of Genoa
- In office January 4, 1553 – January 4, 1555
- Preceded by: Luca Spinola
- Succeeded by: Agostino Pinelli Ardimenti

Personal details
- Born: 1508 Genoa, Republic of Genoa
- Died: 1578 (aged 69–70) Genoa, Republic of Genoa

Giacomo Promontorio (1508–1578) was the 58th Doge of the Republic of Genoa.

== Biography ==
Promontorio was elected to the dogal title on January 4, 1553, the thirteenth in biennial succession and the fifty-eighth in republican history. Under his mandate, the Jesuits settled in Genoa and began organizing and founding public schools. After his office on January 4, 1555 he served the republic in other state offices. He died in Genoa in 1578 and was buried inside the church of Santa Caterina.

== See also ==
- Republic of Genoa
- Doge of Genoa
