= Girolamo Vivaldi =

61st Doge of Genoa

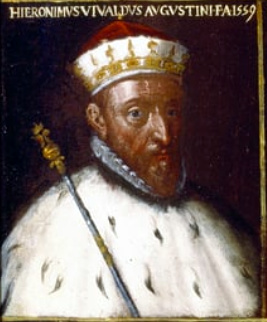

61st Doge of the Republic of Genoa
- In office 4 January 1559 – 4 January 1561
- Preceded by: Pietro Giovanni Chiavica Cibo
- Succeeded by: Paolo Battista Giudice Calvi

Personal details
- Born: 1495 Genoa, Republic of Genoa
- Died: 1577 (aged 81–82) Genoa, Republic of Genoa

Girolamo Vivaldi (c. 1495 – 1577) was the 61st Doge of the Republic of Genoa.

== Biography ==
Born in Genoa around 1495, an exponent of the Genoese noble family of the Vivaldi, he held various positions for the Genoese State, including procurator of the Republic, member of the college of Governors, mayor of the village of Sestri Levante, and supreme syndicator.

Vivaldi was elected doge on 4 January 1559, the sixteenth in biennial succession and the sixty-first in the history of the republic. In his mandate he worked to take measures for public order, he graced some French prisoners detained in the port of Castiglione della Pescaia, and Genoa under his dogate rejoiced at the peace reached between Spain under Philip II and France under Henry II, which indirectly benefitted the Genoese state.

When the doge's mandate ended on 4 January 1561, Girolamo Vivaldi preferred not to participate in public life any longer due to obvious health problems. He died in Genoa in 1577 and was buried inside the sanctuary of the Madonna del Monte.

== See also ==
- Doge of Genoa
- Republic of Genoa
