= Nicolò Doria =

Doge of the Republic of Genoa

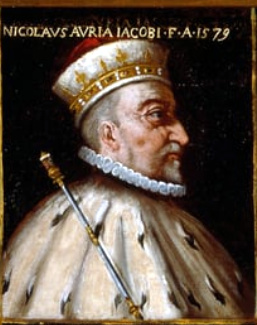

72nd Doge of the Republic of Genoa
- In office October 20, 1579 – October 20, 1581
- Preceded by: Giovanni Battista Gentile Pignolo
- Succeeded by: Gerolamo De Franchi Toso

Personal details
- Born: 1525 Genoa, Republic of Genoa
- Died: 1592 (aged 66–67) Genoa, Republic of Genoa

Nicolò Doria (Genoa, 1525 – Genoa, 13 October 1592) was the 72nd Doge of the Republic of Genoa.

== Biography ==
Son of Giacomo Doria and Bettina De Mari, and member of the wealthy Doria family, he was born in Genoa presumably around 1525. On 20 October 1579 he was therefore elected Doge of the Republic, the twenty-seventh position since the biennial reform and the seventy-second in republican history. The new doge Nicolò Doria was therefore called to revive a Genoa, and its republic, devastated by a civil war between the noble factions, but which also had repercussions on the Genoese population and on the international scene. After the end of his Dogate, Doria was then appointed perpetual procurator and representative of the Magistrate of Corsica. He died in Genoa on 13 October 1592.

== See also ==
- Republic of Genoa
- Doge of Genoa
- Doria (family)
