= Giacomo Grimaldi Durazzo =

Doge of the Republic of Genoa

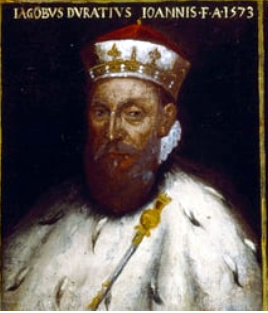

69th Doge of the Republic of Genoa
- In office October 16, 1573 – October 17, 1575
- Preceded by: Giannotto Lomellini
- Succeeded by: Prospero Centurione Fattinanti

Personal details
- Born: 1503 Genoa, Republic of Genoa
- Died: 1579 (aged 75–76) Genoa, Republic of Genoa

Giacomo Grimaldi Durazzo (Genoa, 1503 - Genoa, 1579) was the 69th Doge of the Republic of Genoa.

== Biography ==
Giacomo Grimaldi Durazzo was a member of one of the most important noble families of the Republic of Genoa, the Durazzo family, that had its origins in Albania and who arrived in Genoa around the fourteenth century, active in the commercial silk sector and fabrics. His father Giovanni was also a person who held various public offices for the republic, fueling the "weight" and prestige of the Durazzo family who, enrolled in the Alberghi of the Genoese nobility since 1528, and was affiliated to the Grimaldi family.

Grimaldi Durazzo's appointment as doge took place in a very tumultuous political and social climate. From the 1560s in Genoa the tension between the two main nobility, the "old" and the "new", was growing more and more due also to the new international political scenarios and the death in 1560 of Admiral Andrea Doria, who was never doge, was however always considered as political leader or guide in political, commercial and alliance choices of the Republic of Genoa. It is no coincidence that some Doges were "supported" or "highly recommended" by Doria himself to the electoral council, especially in the delicate phases for Genoa. In the first year of his Dogate Giacomo Grimaldi Durazzo met several Italian and foreign personalities in Genoa. After the end of his Dogate, he was appointed perpetual prosecutor, however he took little part in Genoese political activity. Durazzo died in Genoa in 1579.

Giacomo Grimaldi Durazzo married in late age with Maria Maggiolo di Vincenzo, from which he had seven children:

- Giovanni: married with the sister of the future doge Alessandro Giustiniani Longo,
- Pietro Durazzo: Doge of Genoa
- Agostino: lord of Gabiano and husband of the sister of the doge Giovanni Francesco I Brignole Sale
- Lucrezia: married to a member of the noble Balbi family
- Maddalena: wife of the doge Federico De Franchi Toso
- Battina: married to a member of the noble Balbi family
- Laura

== See also ==
- Republic of Genoa
- Doge of Genoa
- House of Grimaldi
- Durazzo family
