= Giovanni Battista Cicala Zoagli =

Doge of the Republic of Genoa

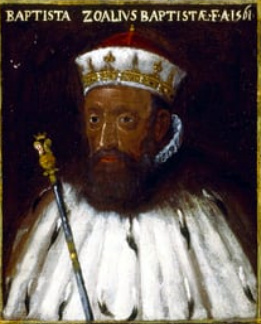

63rd Doge of the Republic of Genoa
- In office October 4, 1561 – October 4, 1563
- Preceded by: Paolo Battista Giudice Calvi
- Succeeded by: Giovanni Battista Lercari

Personal details
- Born: 1485 Genoa, Republic of Genoa
- Died: 1566 (aged 80–81) Genoa, Republic of Genoa

Giovanni Battista Cicala Zoagli (Genoa, 1485 - Genoa, 1566) was the 63rd Doge of the Republic of Genoa.

== Biography ==
Zoagli was remembered by historians as "rigorous" for the economy of the Genoese state. As doge he had to face again the problem of Corsica which returned under the unique power of the Republic, no longer therefore of the Bank of Saint George, as well as other "mainland" towns and cities.

In the two years that led the government of Genoa, he promoted a real policy of saving public finances and, more importantly for the doge himself, to cancel or almost cancel the Genoese insolvency, both of the state and its citizens, against creditors. After his mandate ended in January 1563 he was appointed perpetual procurator. He died in Genoa in 1566.

== See also ==
- Republic of Genoa
- Doge of Genoa

== Sources ==
- Buonadonna, Sergio. Rosso doge. I dogi della Repubblica di Genova dal 1339 al 1797.
