= Simone Spinola =

Doge of Genoa from 1567 to 1569

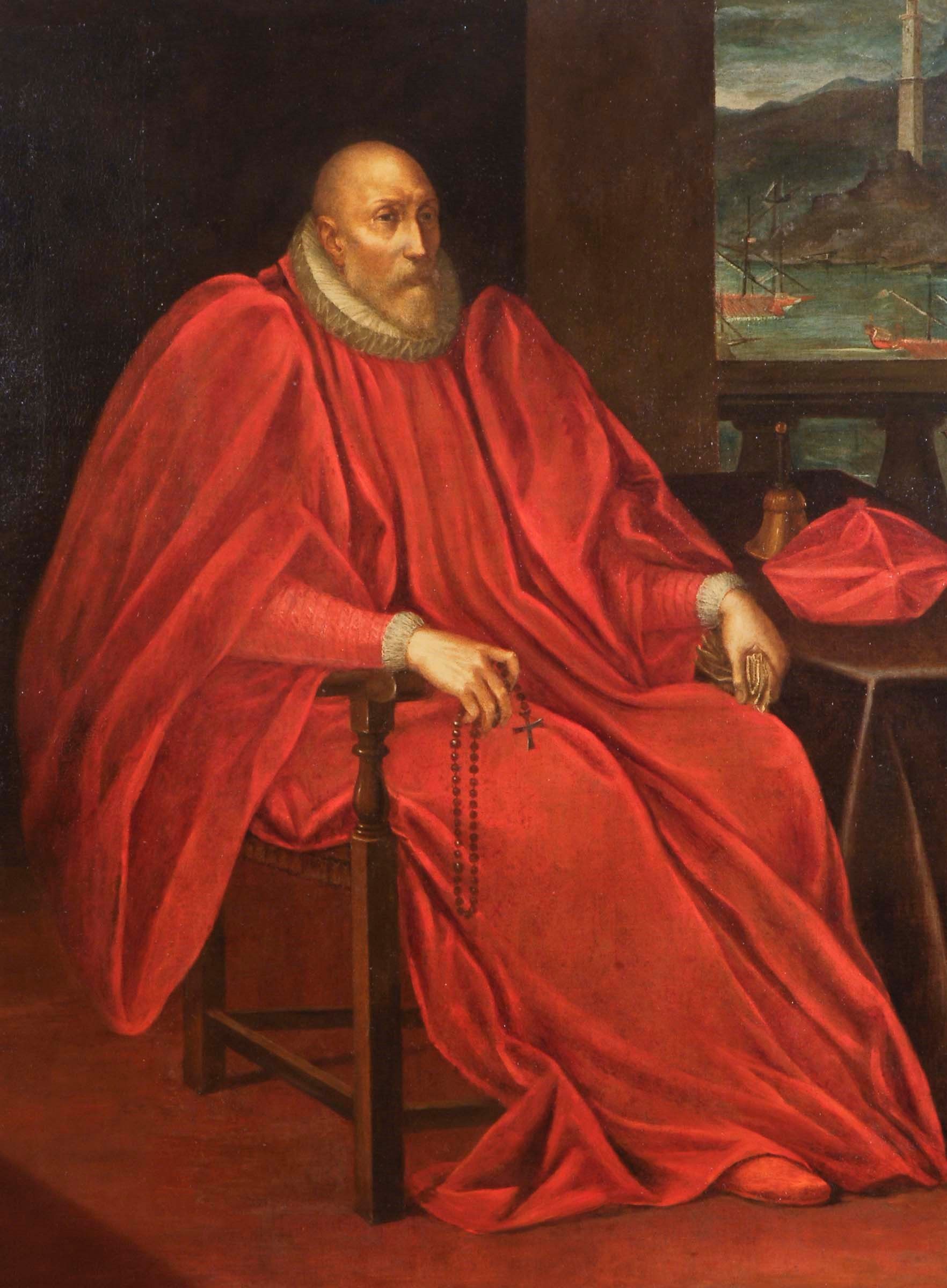

66th Doge of the Republic of Genoa
- In office 15 October 1567 – 3 October 1569
- Preceded by: Ottavio Gentile Oderico
- Succeeded by: Paolo Giustiniani Moneglia

Personal details
- Born: 1497 Genoa, Republic of Genoa
- Died: 3 October 1569 (aged 71–72) Genoa, Republic of Genoa

Simone Spinola (Genoa, 1497 - Genoa, 3 October 1569) was the 66th Doge of the Republic of Genoa.

== Biography ==
Born in Genoa in a period around 1497, Simone Spinola was member of the noble Spinola family of the Luccoli branch and adhered to that nobility considered "old" and opposed to the "new" one. A skilled merchant, in Antwerp and in the County of Flanders, he made his fortune while maintaining economic and state relations with Genoa. And in certain years he returned to the Genoese republic where, among other positions, he held the position of consul.

Without ever neglecting his interests in Flanders where he periodically went, he received the position of ambassador to Genoa from the Senate in the papal court of Pope Pius V during 1566.

Returning to the Genoese capital in 1567, Simone Spinola, on 15 October that year, was elected by the Grand Council new Doge of the Republic of Genoa, the twenty-first since the biennial reform and the sixty-sixth in republican history.

The benevolent efforts that led to a reconciliation of the relations between the Genoese republic and its colony of Corsica are mentioned in the annals of the main and relevant facts of its stave. He had not yet completed his mandate when, suddenly, Doge Spinola died in Genoa on 3 October 1569. The body was buried in the mausoleum of the chapel of Santa Caterina da Siena inside the no longer existing church of San Domenico.

== See also ==
- Doge of Genoa
- Republic of Genoa
