= Paolo Battista Giudice Calvi =

Doge of Genoa (1490–1561)

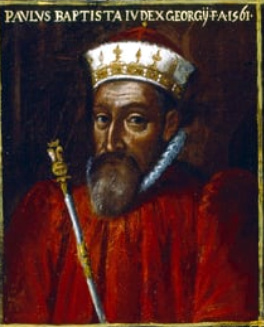

62nd Doge of the Republic of Genoa
- In office 4 January 1561 – 27 September 1561
- Preceded by: Girolamo Vivaldi
- Succeeded by: Giovanni Battista Cicala Zoagli

Personal details
- Born: 1490 Genoa, Republic of Genoa
- Died: 27 September 1561 (aged 70–71) Genoa, Republic of Genoa

Paolo Battista Giudice Calvi (Genoa, 1490 - Genoa, 27 September 1561) was the 62nd Doge of the Republic of Genoa.

== Biography ==
Born in Genoa around 1490, his family was dedicated to merchandising, but the young Paolo Battista Giudice Calvi preferred to set his life more on the military branch. His name appears in fact among the naval officers, and then with the appointment of captain, during the crucial phases of 1528 for the "reconquest of independence" of the Republic of Genoa from France. Later he was named among the ambassadors of Genoa present at the meeting in Bologna between Pope Clement VII and Emperor Charles V.

He was appointed doge of Genoa with the election of 4 January 1561: the seventeenth in biennial succession and the sixty-second in republican history.

His dogate lasted only a little over eight months, the second doge to die in office after Pietro Giovanni Chiavica Cibo in 1558, due to the worsening of his state of health which led to his death on 27 September 1561. His body was buried in the family chapel inside the Basilica della Santissima Annunziata del Vastato.

== See also ==
- Doge of Genoa
- Republic of Genoa
