= Paolo Giustiniani Moneglia =

Doge of the Republic of Genoa

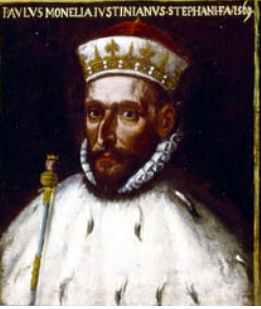

67th Doge of the Republic of Genoa
- In office 6 October 1569 – 6 October 1571
- Preceded by: Simone Spinola
- Succeeded by: Giannotto Lomellini

Personal details
- Born: 1506 Genoa, Republic of Genoa
- Died: 1586 (aged 79–80) Genoa, Republic of Genoa

Paolo Giustiniani Moneglia (Genoa, 1506 – Genoa, 1586) was the 67th Doge of the Republic of Genoa.

== Biography ==
On 6 October 1569, Giustiniani Moneglia was elected new doge of the Republic of Genoa, the twenty-second since the biennial reform and the sixty-seventh in republican history. His two-year term was characterized by periods of contrasts between the two main noble factions and by episodes of famine that forced the Doge and the Senate to seek new sources of supply. Among his management "above the parts", despite belonging to the so-called "new" nobility, he also suggested the appointment in 1570 of Alexander Sauli as bishop of the Diocese of Aleria (present day Haute-Corse).

After the dogal mandate ended on 6 October 1571, Paolo Giustiniani Moneglia continued to serve the Genoese state until his death in Genoa in 1586. His body was buried inside the church of Santa Maria di Castello.

Married to Settimia Invrea, daughter of the future doge Silvestro Invrea, he had a daughter, Caterina.

== See also ==
- Doge of Genoa
- Republic of Genoa
