= Shwezigon Pagoda Bell Inscription =

Multilingual text

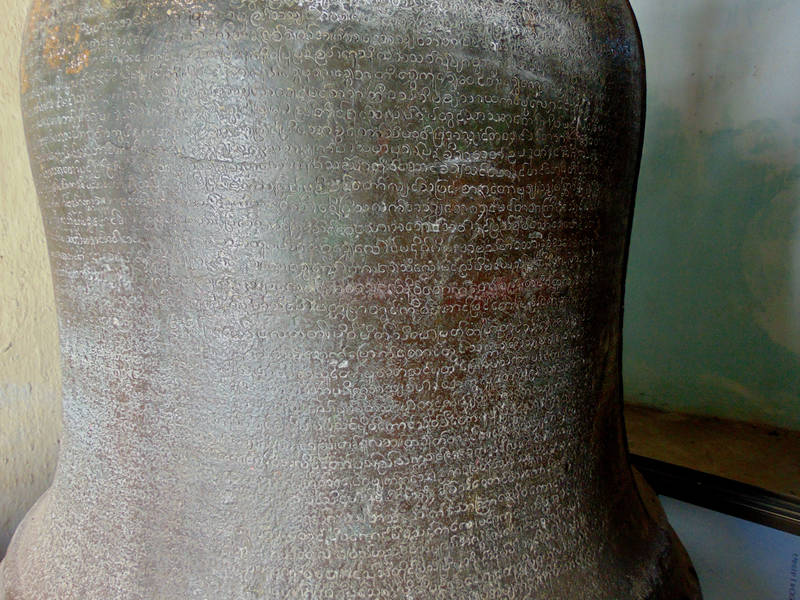
- Author: King Bayinnaung
- Original title: ရွှေစည်းခုံဘုရား ခေါင်းလောင်းစာ
- Translator: Than Tun to English; Chit Thein from Mon to Burmese
- Language: Burmese, Mon, Pali
- Series: Burmese chronicles
- Genre: Chronicle, History
- Publication date: 23 May 1557
- Publication place: Kingdom of Burma
- English publication date: December 2001

The Shwezigon Pagoda Bell Inscription (Burmese: ရွှေစည်းခုံဘုရား ခေါင်းလောင်းစာ) is a multi-language inscription found on the Shwezigon Pagoda Bell, donated by King Bayinnaung of Toungoo Dynasty and located at the Shwezigon Pagoda in Bagan, Burma (Myanmar). Written in Burmese, Mon, and Pali, the inscription lists the important events in the first six years of his reign. It is the only contemporary record in Burmese that calls the king "Conqueror of the Ten Directions", the title by which he is widely known in Mon and Thai.

The Shwezigon Pagoda Bell Inscription is recognised as a documentary heritage of the world and listed in Memory of the World Register by UNESCO.

== Brief ==
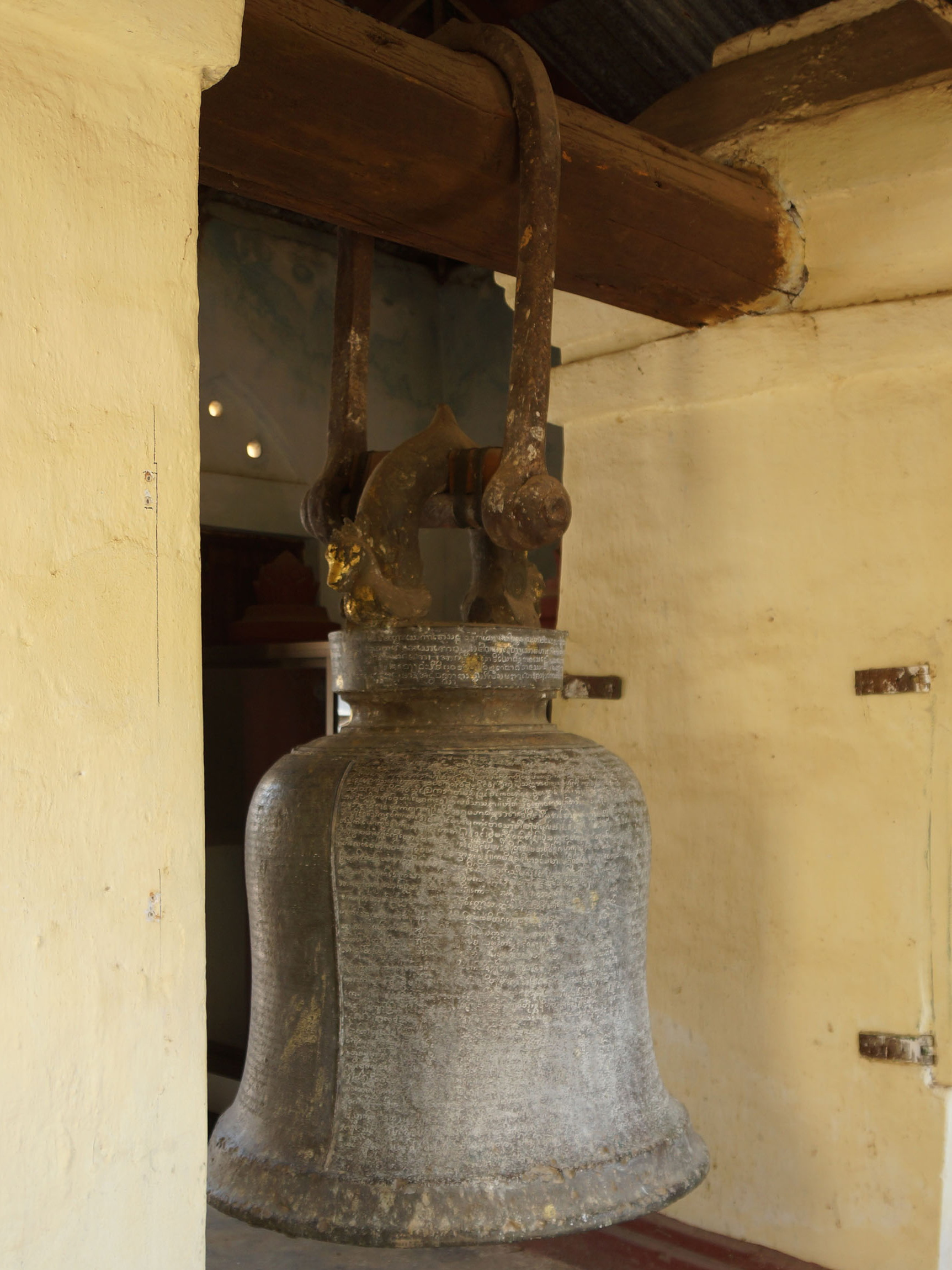
The Shwezigon Pagoda Bell

The inscription contains 43 lines in Burmese, 35 lines in Mon and five lines in Pali. It gives the correct regnal titles for the king and his chief queen as Sri Parama Maha Dhamma Raja and Sri Agga Maha Dhamma Raja Devi, respectively. The main events recorded in the inscription are as follows:

1. Conquest of Toungoo (Taungoo) on 11 January 1551
2. Conquest of Prome (Pyay) on 30 August 1551
3. Conquest of Pegu (Bago) on 12 March 1552
4. Dedication of a Bell of Justice hung outside the Kanbawzathadi Palace
5. Coronation of King Bayinnaung and his chief Queen Atula Thiri on 12 January 1554
6. Conquest of Ava (Inwa) on 22 January 1555
7. Sending a mission to Ceylon (Sri Lanka) for the promotion of Theravada Buddhism
8. Preparation of campaign to conquer the cis-Salween Shan States from 9 November 1556 to 8 January 1557
9. Conquest of Mong Mit (Momeik) and Hsipaw (Thibaw) on 25 January 1557
10. Dedication of a pagoda each at Mong Mit and at Hsipaw on 8 February 1557
11. Conquest of Mong Yang (Mohnyin) on 6 March 1557
12. Conquest of Mong Kawng (Mogaung) on 11 March 1557
13. Prohibition of the burial of male and female slaves at funerals of Shan chieftains
14. Departing Mong Kawng on 9 April 1557
15. Gilding of the Shwezigon Pagoda from plinth to pinnacle
16. Dedication of the Shwezigon Pagoda Bell weighing 2100 viss (7560 lbs or 3423 kg), cast of copper, on 23 May 1557
17. Prayer to attain the Buddhahood and referring himself as the "Conqueror in the Ten Directions".

== Print publications ==
The complete English translation of the inscription was published in the Myanmar Historical Research Journal in December 2001. The Mon part of the inscription was translated to Burmese by Chit Thein, a Mon scholar of the Myanmar Archaeology Department, and was in turn translated into English by Than Tun.

== Bibliography ==
- Thaw Kaung, U (2010). Aspects of Myanmar History and Culture. Yangon: Gangaw Myaing.
