= Eiroku =

Period of Japanese history (1558–1570)

Eiroku (永禄) was a Japanese era name (年号, nengō; "year name") after Kōji and before Genki. This period spanned the years from February 1558 through April 1570. The reigning emperor was Ōgimachi-tennō (正親町天皇).

== Change of era ==
- 1558 Eiroku gannen (永禄元年): The era name was changed to mark the enthronement of Emperor Ōgimachi. The previous era ended and a new one commenced in Kōji 4, on the 28th day of the 2nd month.

== Events of the Eiroku era ==
- 1560 (Eiroku 3, 1st month): Ōgimachi was proclaimed emperor. The ceremonies of coronation were made possible because they were paid for by Mōri Motonari and others.
- June 12, 1560 (Eiroku 3, 19th day of the 5th month): Imagawa Yoshimoto led the armies of the province of Suruga against the Owari; at the Battle of Okehazama (桶狭間の戦い,, Okehazama-no-tatakai), his forces fought against Oda Nobunaga, but Imagawa's army was vanquished and he did not survive. Nobunaga subsequently took over the province of Owari, while Tokugawa Ieyasu claimed the province of Mikawa and made himself master of Okazaki Castle (岡崎城,, Okazaki-jō).
- 1564 (Eiroku 7): Nobunaga attacked Inabayama Castle in an effort to take Mino Province from the Saitō clan, but was defeated and driven out of Mino.
- 1567 (Eiroku 10, 8th month): Nobunaga defeated the Saito clan, completed the conquest of Mino; and established Gifu Castle as his primary residence and headquarters.
- 1568 (Eiroku 11, 2nd month): Ashikaga Yoshihide became shōgun.
- 1568 (Eiroku 11, 9th month): Shōgun Yoshihide died from a contagious disease.

== Notes ==
Preceded by Kōji	Era or nengō Eiroku; 1558–1570	Succeeded by Genki
