= Giannotto Lomellini =

Doge of the Republic of Genoa

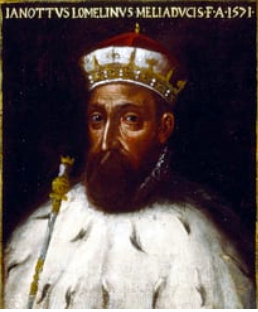

68th Doge of the Republic of Genoa
- In office October 10, 1571 – October 10, 1573
- Preceded by: Paolo Giustiniani Moneglia
- Succeeded by: Giacomo Grimaldi Durazzo

Personal details
- Born: 1519 Genoa, Republic of Genoa
- Died: 1574 (aged 54–55) Genoa, Republic of Genoa

Giannotto Lomellini (Genoa, 1519 – Genoa, 1574) was the 68th Doge of the Republic of Genoa.

== Biography ==
Like the dogates of his predecessors, the doge Lomellini, the twenty-third since the biennial reform and the sixty-eighth in republican history, also had to face the new noble contrasts that animated the streets of the Genoese capital. At the beginning of the mandate, the annals testify to a wide contrast with Matteo Senarega, esteemed and powerful chancellor of the Republic, and future doge in the two-year period 1595–1597, because of Lomellini's claims to sign the letters on an equal footing with foreign principles, protocol not provided instead in the Genoese order.

More fortunate and important political strategy was the submission of Corsica after the independence and anti-Genoese unrest started by the leader Sampiero Corso; it was the same son of Sampiero, Alfonso, returning from France to negotiate the surrender with the Republic.

After his mandate ended, Giannotto Lomellini died in Genoa in 1574 and was buried in a chapel at the bottom of the right nave of the Church of the Santissima Annunziata in Sturla.

== See also ==
- Republic of Genoa
- Doge of Genoa
