= Genki (era) =

Period of Japanese history (1570–1573)

Genki (元亀) was a Japanese era name (年号, nengō; "year name") after Eiroku and before Tenshō. This period spanned from April 1570 through July 1573. The reigning emperor was Ōgimachi-tennō (正親町天皇).

== Change of era ==
- Genki gannen (元亀元年); 1570: The era name was changed because of various wars. The previous era ended and a new one commenced in Eiroku 13, on the 23rd day of the 4th month.

== Events of the Genki era ==
- 1570 (Genki 1, 6th month): The combined forces of the Azai clan, led by Azai Nagamasa, and the Asakura clan, led by Asakura Yoshikage, met the forces of Oda Nobunaga in a shallow riverbed. The confrontation has come to be known as the Battle of Anegawa. Tokugawa Ieyasu led forces which came to the aid of Oda's army; and Oda claimed the victory.
- 1571 (Genki 2, 9th month): Nobunaga marched into Ōmi Province at the head of his army which surrounded Mt. Hiei. He massacred the priests and everyone else associated with the mountain temples; and then he gave orders that every structure on the mountain should be burned.
- 1572 (Genki 3, 12th month): Takeda Shingen, the daimyō of Kai Province, led his army into Tōtōmi Province where he engaged the forces of Tokugawa Ieyasu at the Battle of Mikatagahara.
- 1573 (Genki 4, 2nd month): Ashikaga Yoshiaki began to fortify Nijō Castle; and he sent messages to Azai Nagamasa, Asakura Yoshikage, and Takeda Shingen, announcing his intention to start a Revolt against Nobunaga. Six months later, the confrontation would end with Yoshiaki driven out of Kyoto and the Ashikaga shogunate de facto dismantled.

== Notes ==
Preceded by Eiroku	Era or nengō Genki; 1570–1573	Succeeded by Tenshō
