= Ottavio Gentile Oderico =

Doge of the Republic of Genoa

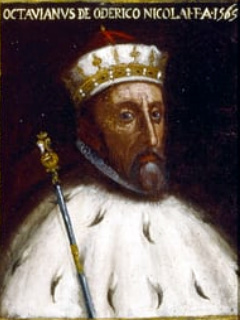

65th Doge of the Republic of Genoa
- In office October 11, 1565 – October 11, 1567
- Preceded by: Giovanni Battista Lercari
- Succeeded by: Simone Spinola

Personal details
- Born: 1499 Genoa, Republic of Genoa
- Died: 1575 (aged 75–76) Genoa, Republic of Genoa

Ottavio Gentile Oderico (Genoa, 1499 - Genoa, 1575) was the 65th Doge of the Republic of Genoa.

== Biography ==
Among the important events of the dogate of Ottavio Gentile Oderico there was the management, not perfect initially, of the train that the revolt of Sampiero Corso brought to Corsica. Commissioner Francesco De Fornari was sent to the island to initiate a peace negotiation with Sampiero's son Alfonso D'Ornano which, however, took shape from 1569 on the initiative of Commissioner Giorgio Doria considered more diplomatic. The election to the papal throne of Pope Pius V was propitious to the Doge and the Genoese government for the revision and discussion of some important points between the Republic of Genoa and the Holy See, a new line that compared Genoa to the Republic of Venice. Doge Gentile himself spoke for some requests, a treaty where he could show off his perhaps unique philosophical and scientific abilities. After the end of the dogate, on 11 October 1567, he was appointed perpetual procurator. Oderico died in Genoa in 1575.

== See also ==
- Republic of Genoa
- Doge of Genoa

== Sources ==
- Buonadonna, Sergio. Rosso doge. I dogi della Repubblica di Genova dal 1339 al 1797.
