= Emperor Ōgimachi =

Emperor of Japan from 1557 to 1586

Emperor Ōgimachi 正親町天皇
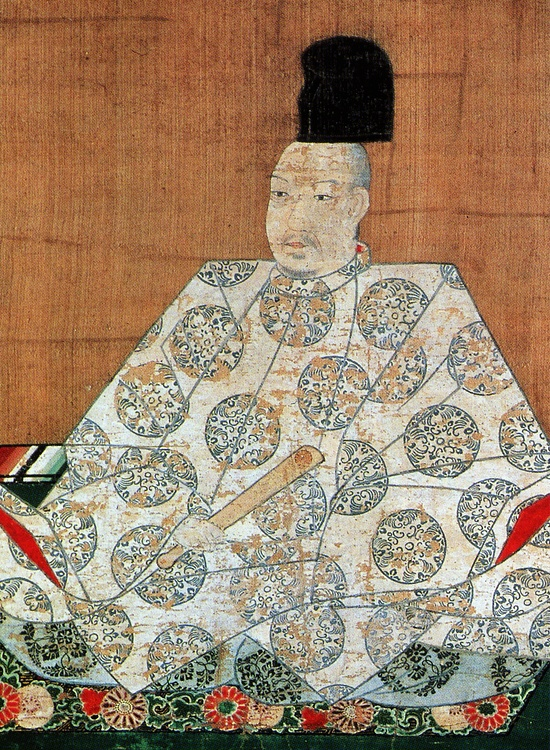

Emperor of Japan
- Reign: November 17, 1557 – December 17, 1586
- Enthronement: February 22, 1560
- Predecessor: Go-Nara
- Successor: Go-Yōzei
- Shōguns: See list: Ashikaga Yoshiteru; Ashikaga Yoshihide; Ashikaga Yoshiaki
- Born: Michihito (方仁); June 18, 1517; Ashikaga shogunate
- Died: February 6, 1593 (aged 75); Sentō Palace, Kyoto. Azuchi–Momoyama period
- Burial: Fukakusa no kita no Misasagi (深草北陵) Kyoto
- Issue more...: Prince Masahito
Posthumous name
- Tsuigō: Emperor Ōgimachi (正親町院 or 正親町天皇)
- House: Imperial House of Japan
- Father: Emperor Go-Nara
- Mother: Madenokōji (Fujiwara) Eishi
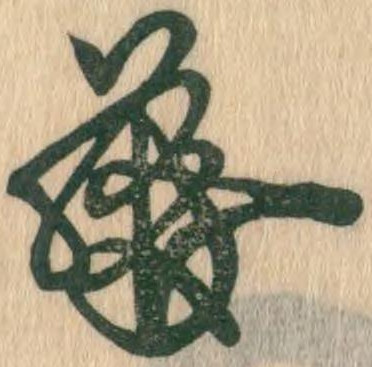
- Signature

Emperor Ōgimachi (正親町天皇, Ōgimachi-tennō; June 18, 1517 – February 6, 1593) was the 106th Emperor of Japan, according to the traditional order of succession. He reigned from November 17, 1557, to his abdication on December 17, 1586, corresponding to the transition between the Sengoku period of the Muromachi bakufu and the dawn of the new Azuchi–Momoyama period. His personal name was Michihito (方仁).

== Genealogy ==
Ōgimachi was the first son of Emperor Go-Nara.

- Lady-in-waiting (Naishi-no-Suke): Madenokōji (Fujiwara) Fusako (万里小路 房子; d.1580) later Seiko-in (清光院), Madenokōji Hidefusa's daughter
  - Second daughter: Princess Eikō (1540–1551; 永高女王)
  - Third daughter (b.1543)
  - Eldest son: Imperial Prince Masahito (誠仁親王, Masahito-shinnō; 1552–1586), also known as Prince Sanehito and posthumously named Yōkwōin daijō-tennō. Masahito's eldest son was Imperial Prince Kazuhito (和仁親王, Kazuhito-shinnō; 1572–1617) who became Emperor Go-Yōzei. Go-Yōzei elevated the rank of his father, even though his father's untimely death made this impossible in life. In this manner, Go-Yōzei himself could enjoy the polite fiction of being the son of an emperor.
  - Daughter (1562–67, mother speculated)
- Lady-in-waiting (Naishi-no-Suke): Asukai Masatsuna's daughter
  - daughter: ??? (春齢女王; 1549–1569)
  - daughter: Princess Eisho (永尊女王; 1563–1571)
- Lady-in-waiting (Naishi-no-Suke): Dai-Naishi (大典侍), Madenokōji Katafusa's daughter
  - First daughter (1539–1543)

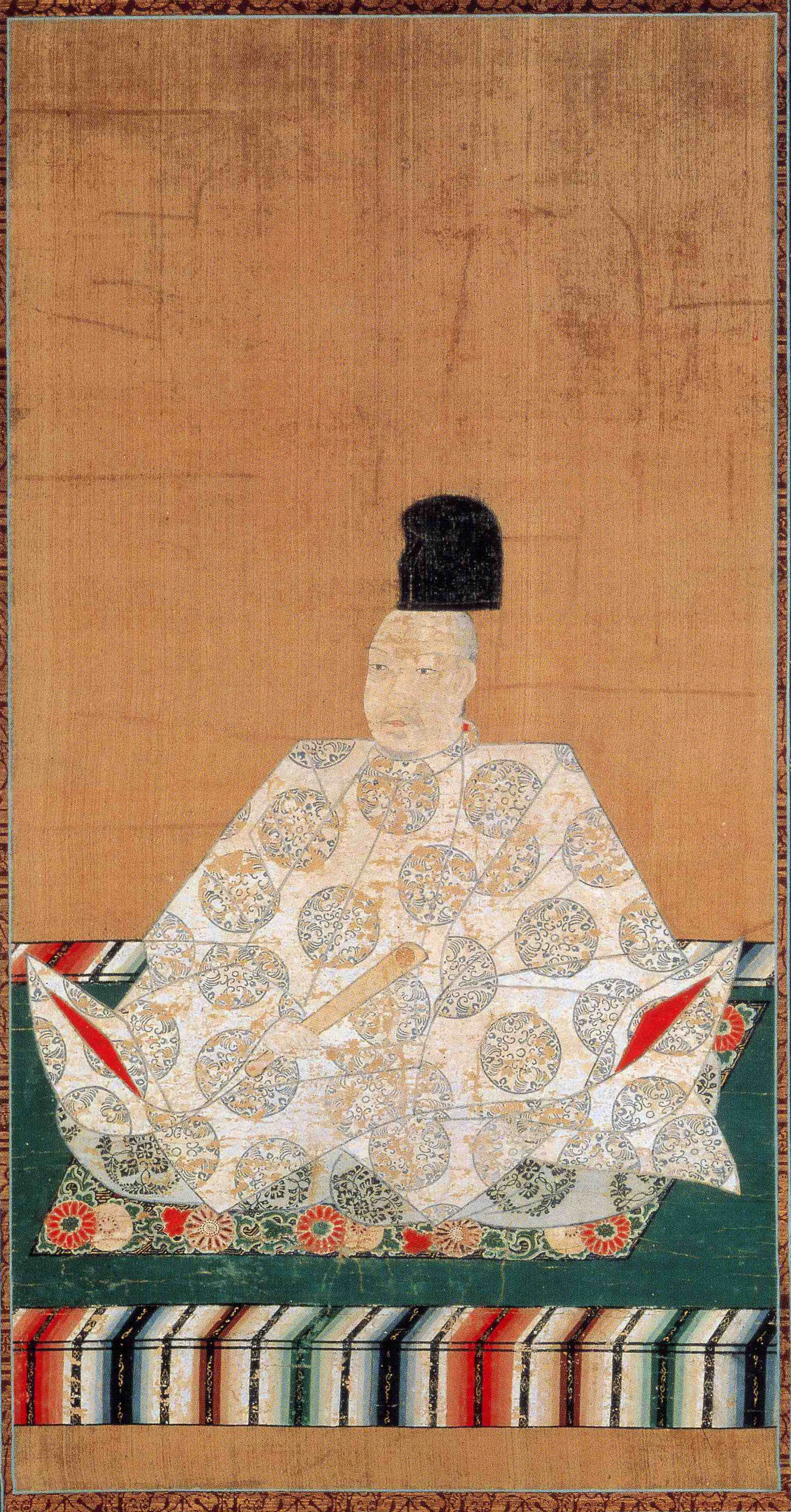
Formal portrait of retired emperor.

== Events of Ōgimachi's life ==
Ōgimachi became Emperor upon the death of Emperor Go-Nara.

- 1560 (Eiroku 3, 1st month): Ōgimachi was proclaimed emperor. The ceremonies of coronation were made possible because they were paid for by Mōri Motonari and others.
- 1560 (Eiroku 3, 5th month): Imagawa Yoshimoto led the armies of the province of Suruga against the Owari; at the Battle of Okehazama, his forces fought against Oda Nobunaga, but Imagawa's army was vanquished and he was slain. Then Nobunaga took over the province of Owari. Tokugawa Ieyasu took over the province of Mikawa and made himself master of Okazaki Castle.
- 1564 (Eiroku 7): Oda Nobunaga completed the conquest of Mino; he built a new castle at Gifu.
- 1568 (Eiroku 11, 2nd month): Ashikaga Yoshihide became shōgun.
- 1568 (Eiroku 11, 9th month): Shōgun Yoshihide died from a contagious disease.

The finances of the emperor and his court were greatly strained. The authority of the Imperial Court also began to fall, but this trend reversed after Oda Nobunaga entered Kyoto in a show of allegiance but which also indicated that the Emperor had the Oda clan's support. Frequently using the Emperor as a mediator when fighting enemies, Nobunaga worked to unify the disparate elements to Japan. However, by around 1573, Nobunaga began demanding the Emperor's abdication, but the Emperor refused.

Before political power was transferred to Toyotomi Hideyoshi, in order to take advantage of Ōgimachi's authority, the power of the Imperial Family was increased. In this way, Hideyoshi and the Imperial Family entered into a mutually beneficial relationship.

In January of the year Tenshō 14 (1586), the regent had the Golden Tea Room brought to Kyoto Imperial Palace to host the emperor there.

In 1586, Emperor Ōgimachi abdicated in favor of his grandson, Imperial Prince Katahito (周仁親王), who became the Emperor Go-Yōzei. Ōgimachi retired to the Sentō Palace. On February 6, 1593, he died.

During Ōgimachi's reign, with the assistance of Oda Nobunaga and Toyotomi Hideyoshi, the imperial family was able to halt the political, financial, and cultural decline it had been in since the Ōnin War, and began a time of recovery.

Ōgimachi is enshrined with other emperors at the imperial tomb called Fukakusa no kita no misasagi (深草北陵) in Fushimi-ku, Kyoto.

=== Kugyō ===
Kugyō (公卿) is a collective term for the very few most powerful men attached to the court of the Emperor of Japan in pre-Meiji eras. Even during those years in which the court's actual influence outside the palace walls was minimal, the hierarchic organization persisted.

In general, this elite group included only three to four men at a time. These were hereditary courtiers whose experience and background would have brought them to the pinnacle of a life's career. During Ōgimachi's reign, this apex of the Daijō-kan included:

- Kampaku (Regent for an adult Emperor):
  - Konoe (Fujiwara) Sakihisa (1554–1568)
  - Nijō (Fujiwara) Haruyoshi (1569–1578)
  - Kujō (Fujiwara) Kanetaka (1579–1581)
  - Ichijō (Fujiwara) Uchimoto (1581–1585)
  - Nijō (Fujiwara) Akizane (1585)
  - Hashiba (Fujiwara > Toyotomi) Hideyoshi (1585–1592)
- Daijō-daijin (Chancellor):
  - Konoe (Fujiwara) Sakihisa (1582)
  - Hashiba (Fujiwara > Toyotomi) Hideyoshi (1586–1598)
- Sadaijin (Minister of the Left):
  - Konoe (Fujiwara) Sakihisa (1554–1557)
  - Saionji (Fujiwara) Kintomo (1557–1576)
  - Kujō (Fujiwara) Kanetaka (1576–1577)
  - Ichijō (Fujiwara) Uchimoto (1577–1585)
  - Nijō (Fujiwara) Akizane (1585)
  - Konoe (Fujiwara) Nobusuke (1585–1592)
- Udaijin (Minister of the Right):
  - Kazannoin (Fujiwara) Iesuke (1557–1574)
  - Kujō (Fujiwara) Kanetaka (1574–1576)
  - Ichijō (Fujiwara) Uchimoto (1576–1577)
  - Oda (Taira) Nobunaga (1577–1578)
  - Nijō (Fujiwara) Akizane (1579–1585)
  - Imadegawa (Fujiwara) Harusue (1585–1595)
- Naidaijin (Minister of the center):
  - Nakanoin (Minamoto) Michitame (one day in 1565)
  - Kajūji (Fujiwara) Tadatoyo (1572)
  - Madenokōji (Fujiwara) Korefusa (one day in 1573)
  - Ichijō (Fujiwara) Uchimoto (1575–1576)
  - Oda (Taira) Nobunaga (1576–1577)
  - Nijō (Fujiwara) Akizane (1577–1579)
  - Sanjōnishi (Fujiwara) Saneki (1579)
  - Imadegawa (Fujiwara) Harusue (1579–1580)
  - Tokudaiji (Fujiwara) Kinfusa (1580)
  - Imadegawa (Fujiwara) Harusue (second time, 1580)
  - Konoe (Fujiwara) Nobusuke (1580–1585)
  - Hashiba (Fujiwara > Toyotomi) Hideyoshi (1585–1587)

== Eras of Ōgimachi's reign ==
The years of Ōgimachi's reign are more specifically identified by more than one era name or nengō.

- Kōji (1555–1558)
- Eiroku (1558–1570)
- Genki (1570–1573)
- Tenshō (1573–1592)

== Ancestry ==
Ancestors of Emperor Ōgimachi

8. Emperor Go-Tsuchimikado (1442–1500)
4.Emperor Go-Kashiwabara (1462–1526)
9. Niwata Asako (1437–1492)
2. Emperor Go-Nara (1495–1557)
10. Kanshūji Norihide (1426–1496) (=12)
5.Kanshūji Fujiko (1464–1535)
11. Asukai (=13)
1. Emperor Ōgimachi
12. Kanshūji Norihide (1426–1496) (=10)
6.Madenokōji Katafusa (1466–1507)
13. Asukai (=11)
3. Madenokōji Eiko (1494–1522)
14. Kikkawa Tsunemoto (1428–1520)
7. Kikkawa
15. Sawa

== See also ==
- Emperor of Japan
- List of Emperors of Japan
- Imperial cult

== Notes ==
Japanese Imperial kamon — a stylized chrysanthemum blossom

Regnal titles
Preceded by Emperor Go-Nara	Emperor of Japan: Ōgimachi; 1557–1586	Succeeded by Emperor Go-Yōzei
