= Pietro Giovanni Chiavica Cibo =

Doge of the Republic of Genoa

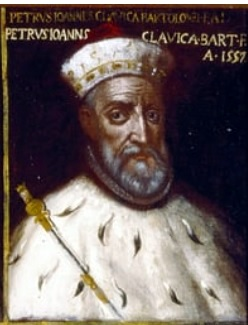

60th Doge of the Republic of Genoa
- In office January 4, 1557 – January 4, 1559
- Preceded by: Agostino Pinelli Ardimenti
- Succeeded by: Girolamo Vivaldi

Personal details
- Born: 1480 Genoa, Republic of Genoa
- Died: September 19, 1559 (aged 78–79) Genoa, Republic of Genoa

Pietro Giovanni Chiavica Cibo (Genoa, 1480 or 1481 - Genoa, 19 September 1559) was the 60th Doge of the Republic of Genoa.

== Biography ==
The historical events of his Dogate attest that from the first days of the official investiture to the highest republican position he dealt with foreign policy in an important and critical phase for Genoa and its republic. The Genoese state was in fact in the grip of the increasingly frequent incursions of Saracen pirates along the coast, to which was added a pressing famine which had to be faced by trying to import new supplies of wheat from the flourishing commercial traffic and from the Genoese communities scattered in the south Italy, particularly Naples, Puglia and Sicily. In economic and commercial matters, he began negotiations and exchanges, sending Genoese ambassadors to the east and to the Middle East. Chiavica Cibo died on September 19, 1559, a few months after the end of his Dogate, he was 77 years old.

== See also ==
- Republic of Genoa
- Doge of Genoa
