= Tenshō (Momoyama period) =

Period of Japanese history (1573–1592)

Tenshō (天正) was a Japanese era name (年号, nengō; "year" name) after Genki and before Bunroku. This period spanned the years from July 1573 through December 1592 during the Sengoku era. The reigning emperors were Ōgimachi-tennō (正親町天皇) and Go-Yōzei-tennō (後陽成天皇).

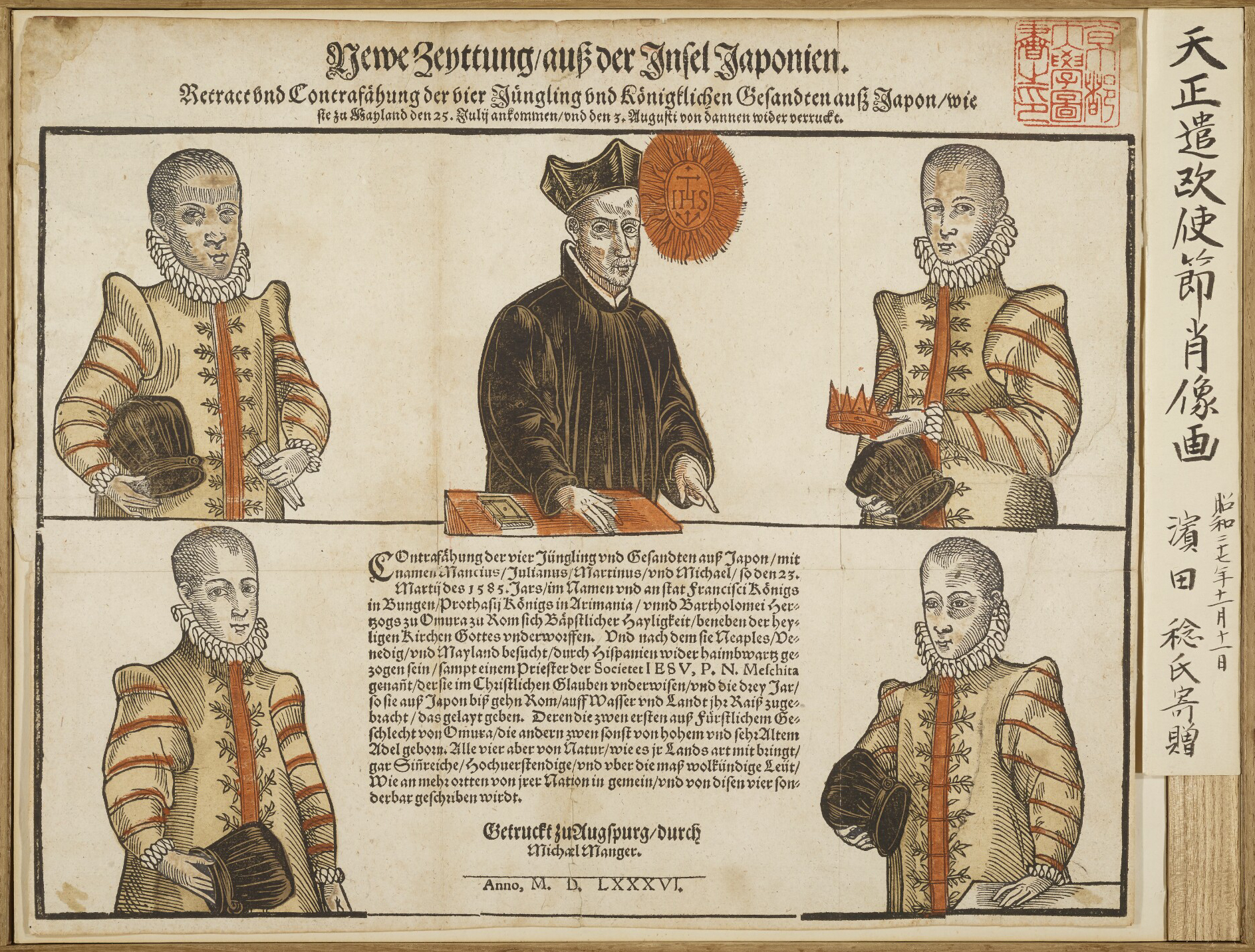
Tenshō noblemen in a German newspaper from 1586

== Change of era ==
- 1573 Tenshō gannen (天正元年): The new era name was created to mark a number of regional wars. The era name was inspired by a passage from the Chinese classic Tao Te Ching by Laozi: :"Those who are at peace with nature bring all under Heaven into its correct pattern" (清静者為天下正).

The era name Tenshō was suggested by Oda Nobunaga. The previous era ended, and a new one commenced in Genki 4, the 28th day of the 7th month.

== Events of the Tenshō era ==
European dates up to October 4, 1582 are given in the Julian calendar. Dates since October 15, 1582 are given in the Gregorian calendar.

- 1573 (Tenshō 1, 7th month): Ashikaga Yoshiaki lost his position as shōgun. He shaved his head, becoming a Buddhist priest. Initially, he took the priestly name Sho-san, but he eventually came to be known as Rei-o In.
- 1574 (Tenshō 2, 1st month): Sectarian rebellion in Echizen Province.
- 1574 (Tenshō 2, 9th month): Suppression of sectarian rebellion in Nagashima.
- 1575 (Tenshō 3, 5th month): Takeda Katsuyori led an army into Tōtōmi Province where he lay siege to Nagashino Castle. The Tokugawa defended the castle; and Tokugawa Ieayasu sought assistance from his ally Oda Nobunaga. In response, Nobunaga and his son Nobutada arrived at Nagashino with a large force. In the ensuing Battle of Nagashino, the Takeda attackers were forced to retreat.
- 1576 (Tenshō 4): Takeda Katsuyori ordered the rebuilding of the Asama Shrine at the base of Mount Fuji in Suruga Province. Construction of Azuchi Castle begins.
- 1579 (Tenshō 7, 5th month): Azuchi Sect Debates at Azuchi Castle.
- 1579 (Tenshō 7, 6th month): Akechi Mitsuhide makes himself master of Tanba Province.
- 1579 (Tenshō 7, 10th month): Oda Nobukatsu launches first Tenshō Iga War, ending with his defeat.
- 1580 (Tenshō 8, 11th month): Kaga sectarian rebellion suppressed.
- 1581 (Tenshō 9, 9th month): Oda Nobunaga relaunches the second Tenshō Iga War, ending with victory and Iga left under Nobukatsu's control.
- 1582 (Tenshō 10): Takeda Katsuyori utter defeat by the forces of Oda Nobunaga led to the destruction of Takeda-built structures at the Asama Shrine.
- 1582 (Tenshō 10, 3rd month): Battle of Tenmokuzan.
- 1582 (Tenshō 10, 6th month): Incident at Honnō-ji, Battle of Yamazaki, Council of Kiyosu, Tenshō-Jingo war
- February 20, 1582 (Tenshō 10, 28th day of the 1st month): A Japanese mission or embassy to Europe (Tenshō Ken'ō Shisetsu) sailed from Nagasaki, and its members would not return until 1590. It headed by Mancio Itō and organized on the initiative of Alessandro Valignano. Although less well-known and less well-documented than Hasekura Tsunenaga's diplomatic mission to the Vatican (known as the "Keichō Embassy") in 1613–1620, this historic diplomatic initiative remains a noteworthy accomplishment. The mission is sometimes referred to as the "Tenshō Embassy" because it was initiated in the Tenshō era. This venture was organized by three daimyōs of Western Japan – Ōmura Sumitada, Ōtomo Sōrin and Arima Harunobu.
- 1583 (Tenshō 11, 4th month): Battle of Shizugatake.
- 1584 (Tenshō 12, 4th month): Battle of Komaki and Nagakute.
- August 10, 1584 (Tenshō 12, 15th day of the 7th month): The Japanese mission to the West (Tenshō Ken'ō Shisetsu) arrived in Lisbon.
- 1585 (Tenshō 13, 7th month): Toyotomi Hideyoshi is given the position of kampaku by Emperor Ōgimachi.
- December 17, 1586 (Tenshō 14, 7th day of the 11th month): Ogimachi gave over the reins of civil government to his grandson, who would become Emperor Go-Yozei. There had been no such Imperial since Emperor Go-Hanazono abdicated in Kanshō 5. The dearth of abdications is attributable to the disturbed state of the country and to the fact that there was neither any dwelling in which an ex-emperor could live nor any excess funds in the treasury to support him.
- 1586 (Tenshō 14, 12th month): A political marriage is arranged between the youngest sister of Hideyoshi and Tokugawa Ieyasu.
- 1586 (Tenshō 14, 12th month): The kampaku, Toyotomi Hideyoshi, was nominated to be Daijō-daijin.
- 1586 (Tenshō 14, 12th month): An earthquake strikes the Chubu region, killing 8,000 people.
- 1587 (Tenshō 15): Gold or silver coins called Tenshō-tsūhō were minted. The gold coins (Tenshō-ōban) weighed 165 grams; and these oval shaped coins were worth 10 ryō.
- 1588 (Tenshō 16, 7th month): Emperor Go-Yōzei visits Toyotomi Hideyoshi's mansion, sword hunt decree
- 1590 (Tenshō 18, 7th month): Hideyoshi led an army to the Kantō where he lay siege to Odawara Castle in Sagami province. When the fortress fell, Hōjō Ujimasa died and his brother, Hōjō Ujinao submitted to Hideyoshi's power, thus effectively ending a period of serial internal warfare, which had continued uninterrupted since the Ōnin era (1467).
- 1592 (Tenshō 20, 4th month): The Imjin War begins with the Siege of Busanjin.

In 1589–1590 (in the 23rd year of the reign of King Seonjo of Joseon), a diplomatic mission led by Hwang Yun-gil was sent to Japan. The Joseon ambassador was received by Hideyoshi.

== In popular culture ==
The fictional plot of the classic Akira Kurosawa film Seven Samurai takes place in the 15th year of Tenshō.

== Notes ==
Preceded by Genki (元亀)	Era or nengō Tenshō (天正); 1573–1592	Succeeded by Bunroku (文禄)
