= Giovanni Battista Lercari (1507–1592) =

Doge of the Republic of Genoa and king of Corsica

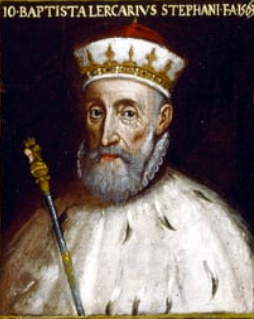

64th Doge of the Republic of Genoa
- In office 7 October 1563 – 7 October 1565
- Preceded by: Giovanni Battista Cicala Zoagli
- Succeeded by: Ottavio Gentile Oderico

Personal details
- Born: 1507 Genoa, Republic of Genoa
- Died: 1592 (aged 84–85) Genoa, Republic of Genoa

Giovanni Battista Lercari (Genoa, 1507 – Genoa, 1592) was the 64th Doge of the Republic of Genoa.

== Biography ==
Giovanni Battista Lercari was elected on 7 October 1563 the new doge of the Republic of Genoa, the nineteenth since the biennial reform and the sixty-fourth in republican history. His Dogate was dominated by a new internal contrast between the "old" and "new" nobility that fractured after the clashes that took place in Corsica, after the death of the admiral Andrea Doria and above all from the new international scenarios. Giovanni Battista Lercari died in 1592 in the Genoese capital leaving as his only heir his daughter Pellina.

== See also ==
- Republic of Genoa
- Doge of Genoa
