= Agostino Pinelli Ardimenti =

Doge of the Republic of Genoa

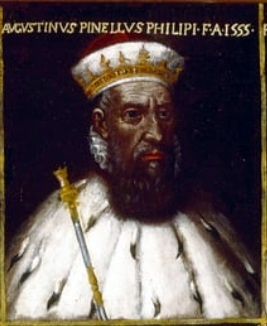

59th Doge of the Republic of Genoa
- In office 4 January 1555 – 4 January 1557
- Preceded by: Giacomo Promontorio
- Succeeded by: Pietro Giovanni Chiavica Cibo

Personal details
- Born: 1492 Genoa, Republic of Genoa
- Died: 1566 (aged 73–74) Genoa, Republic of Genoa

Agostino Pinelli Ardimenti (Genoa, 1492 - Genoa, 1566) was the 59th Doge of the Republic of Genoa.

== Biography ==
Agostino Ardimenti was elected to the dogal title on 4 January 1555, the fourteenth in two-year succession and the ninety-ninth in republican history. After his mandate ended on 4 January 1557 he was appointed perpetual procurator by the supreme syndicators. Ardimenti died in Genoa in an attack in 1566, assassinated for an exchange of person by an assassin who had the task of killing the doge Luca Spinola. The instigator of the murder was Giovanni Stefano Lercari, son of the doge Lercari, as revenge against Luca Spinola for the alleged offenses suffered by his father after a speech in the Senate.

== See also ==
- Republic of Genoa
- Doge of Genoa
