= Giovanni Battista Gentile Pignolo =

Doge of the Republic of Genoa

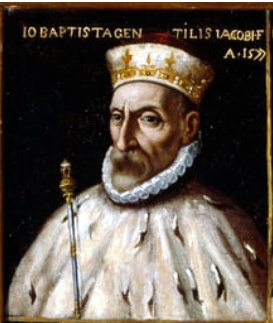

71st Doge of the Republic of Genoa
- In office 19 October 1577 – 19 October 1579
- Preceded by: Prospero Centurione Fattinanti
- Succeeded by: Nicolò Doria

Personal details
- Born: 1525 Genoa, Republic of Genoa
- Died: 1595 (aged 69–70) Genoa, Republic of Genoa

Giovanni Battista Gentile Pignolo (Genoa, 1525 - Genoa, 1595) was the 71st Doge of the Republic of Genoa.

== Biography ==
He was elected to the dogal title on 19 October 1577, the twenty-sixth in biennial succession and the seventy-first in republican history. After his office on 19 October 1579, Giovanni Battista Gentile Pignolo was appointed perpetual procurator and continued to serve the Genoese state for other years.

== See also ==
- Republic of Genoa
- Doge of Genoa
