= Prospero Centurione Fattinanti =

Doge of the Republic of Genoa and king of Corsica

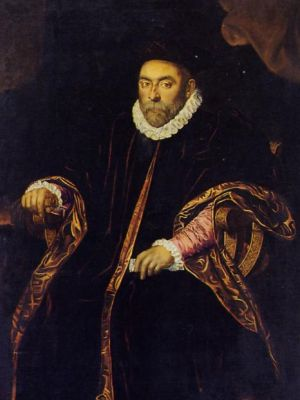

70th Doge of the Republic of Genoa
- In office October 17, 1575 – October 17, 1577
- Preceded by: Giacomo Grimaldi Durazzo
- Succeeded by: Giovanni Battista Gentile Pignolo

Personal details
- Born: 1510 Genoa, Republic of Genoa
- Died: 1581 (aged 70–71) Genoa, Republic of Genoa

Prospero Centurione Fattinanti (Genoa, 1510 - Genoa, 1581) was the 70th Doge of the Republic of Genoa.

== Biography ==
Elected on October 17, 1575, he was the twenty-fifth since the biennial reform and the seventieth in republican history. The mandate of the doge Centurione Fattinanti was characterized mainly by the events that shocked Genoa and its Republic in those years, divided between the two "old" and "new" noble factions: the first ones now in the minority in the Senate and in town for the spontaneous departures from the Genoese capital, the latter called to govern together with new popular alliances. When the dogate ended on October 17, 1577, the former doge Prospero Centurione Fattinanti was appointed perpetual procurator and was the only and last public office he held. He died in Genoa in 1581.

== See also ==
- Republic of Genoa
- Doge of Genoa
