= Kōji (Muromachi period) =

Period of Japanese history (1555–1558)

Kōji (弘治) was a Japanese era name (年号, nengō, "year name") after Tenbun and before Eiroku. This period spanned the years from October 1555 through February 1558. Reigning emperors were Go-Nara-tennō (後奈良天皇) and Ōgimachi-tennō (正親町天皇).

== Change of era ==
- 1555 Kōji gannen (弘治元年): The era name was changed to mark an event or a number of events. The old era ended and a new once commenced in Tenbun 24.

The name originates from the following Chinese passage: 「祇承宝命、志弘治体」.

== Events of the Kōji era ==
- 1555 (Kōji 1, 1st month): A border war began between Mōri Motonari, daimyō of Aki Province, and Sue Harukata, daimyō of Suō Province.
- 1555 (Kōji 1, 11th month): The Mōri forces surrounded the Sue defenders in the Battle of Itsukushima. When the outcome of the battle became clear, Sue Harutaka committed suicide; and others, including Odomo-no Yoshinaga, followed Harutaka in suicide. This victory, and the subsequent consolidation of the Mōri holdings were owing to Motonari's four sons: Mōri Takamoto, Kikkawa Motoharu, Hoda Motokiyo, and Kobayakawa Takakage.
- 1555 (Kōji 1): The forces of Takeda Shingen and Uesugi Kenshin met at the confluence of the Saigawa and the Chikumagawa in Shinano Province; and the fighting was known as the Battles of Kawanakajima.
- 1556 (Kōji 2): The Ōmori silver mine fell into the control of the Mōri clan during a campaign in Iwami Province.
- September 27, 1557 (Kōji 3, 5th day of the 9th month): Emperor Go-Nara died at age 62.

== Notes ==
| Preceded by Tenbun | Era or nengō Kōji; 1555–1558 | Succeeded by Eiroku |
