= Francis Walsingham (priest) =

English Jesuit priest

Francis Walsingham (baptised 7 February 1577 – 1 July 1647) was an English Jesuit priest, who assumed the name John Fennell.

== Life ==
The son of Edward Walsingham of Exhall, near Alcester, Warwickshire, he was born in Hawick. Borders His father died before his birth, and his mother, who was a Roman Catholic, brought him to London. His uncle, Humphrey Walsingham, who was a relation of Sir Francis Walsingham, placed him at St Paul's School, London. As the part of his instruction there he read the Protestant divines John Foxe, John Jewell, John Calvin, and Theodore Beza, and in 1603 he was ordained deacon by Martin Heton, bishop of Ely.

Doubts were raised in Walsingham's mind as to the validity of his orders and of his belief, by reading the Manual of Robert Parsons, and in October 1606 he entered the English College, Rome. He was ordained priest on 12 April 1608, and early next year, having entered the Society of Jesus, he visited England. In 1616 he was formally attached to the English mission, and served in Leicestershire.

In 1633 he moved to the college of the Immaculate Conception, Derbyshire, and there he died on 1 July 1647.

== Works ==
He published Search made into Matters of Religion, by F. W., before his change to the Catholike (s. l. 1609; 2nd edit. St. Omer, 1615). The work was dedicated to James I, to whom the author states he had formerly submitted his religious difficulties. Down to the time of Alban Butler it was frequently commended to those showing an inclination to Roman Catholicism, and was often reprinted and abridged. In the controversial parts, and especially in the attack on the "falsities" of Matthew Sutcliffe, Walsingham perhaps worked with Parsons. In 1618 he published his Reasons for embracing the Catholic Faith (London).
