= Shwezigon Pagoda Bell =

- ရွှေစည်းခုံဘုရား ခေါင်းလောင်း
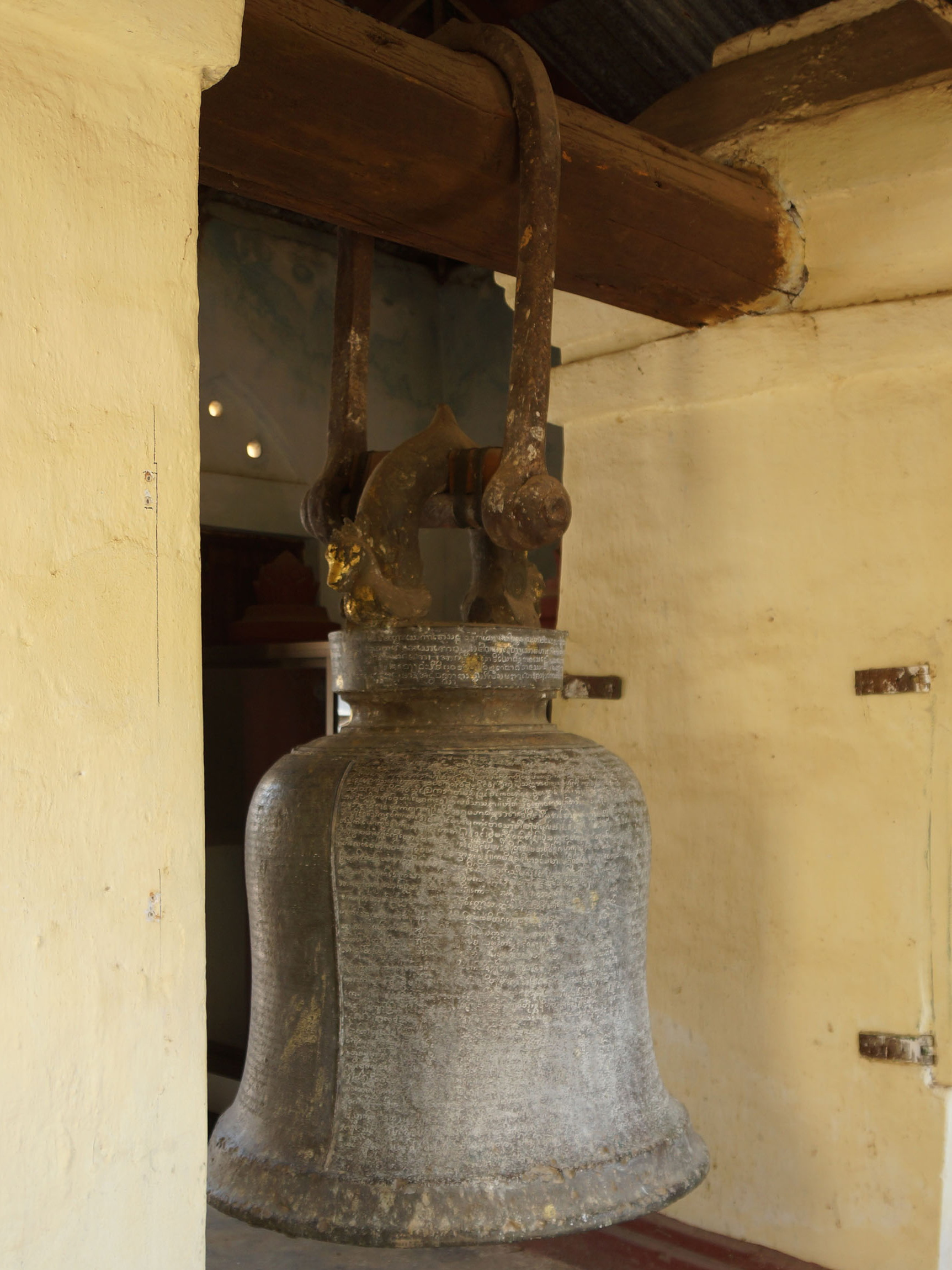
- Interactive map of Shwezigon Pagoda Bell
- Location: Bagan, Myanmar
- Coordinates: 21°11′00″N 94°53′41″E
- Type: Temple Bell
- Material: Copper; 3423 kg
- Opening date: 23 May 1557
- Dedicated to: Shwezigon Pagoda

The Shwezigon Pagoda Bell (Burmese: ရွှေစည်းခုံဘုရား ခေါင်းလောင်း) is a temple bell located at the Shwezigon Pagoda in Bagan, Myanmar. The 3423 kg bell was dedicated to the pagoda by King Bayinnaung of Toungoo Dynasty in 1557. The inscriptions on the bell in Burmese, Mon, and Pali describe the important events of the first six years of his reign.

== Bibliography ==
- Thaw Kaung, U (2010). Aspects of Myanmar History and Culture. Yangon: Gangaw Myaing.
