= 1577 in India =

- Centuries: 15th; 16th; 17th; 18th
- Decades: 1550s; 1560s; 1570s; 1580s; 1590s
- See also: List of years in India; Timeline of Indian history

Events from the year 1577 in India.

== Events ==
- Raja Narsingh Deo rule of the Patna kingdom comes to an end (began 1570)
- Raja Hamir Deo begines rule of the Patna kingdom (continues until 1581)

== See also ==
- Timeline of Indian history
