= 1565 in India =

- Centuries: 16th; 17th; 18th
- Decades: 1540s; 1550s; 1560s; 1570s; 1580s
- See also: List of years in India; Timeline of Indian history

Events from the year 1565 in India.

== Events ==
- Tirumala Deva Raya becomes king of Vijayanagara Empire following Aliya Rama Raya's death (reigns until 1572)
- 26 January – The Battle of Talikota is fought; destruction of Vijayanagar.

== Births ==
- Muhammad Quli Qutb Shah fifth Qutb Shahi sultan of Golkonda and founder of Hyderabad is born (dies 1612)

== Deaths ==
- Aliya Rama Raya progenitor of the Aravidu dynasty of Vijayanagara Empire

== See also ==
- Timeline of Indian history
