= 1573 in India =

- Centuries: 15th; 16th; 17th; 18th
- Decades: 1550s; 1560s; 1570s; 1580s; 1590s
- See also: List of years in India; Timeline of Indian history

Events from the year 1573 in India.

== Events ==
- Sidi Saiyyed Mosque, Ahmedabad built.

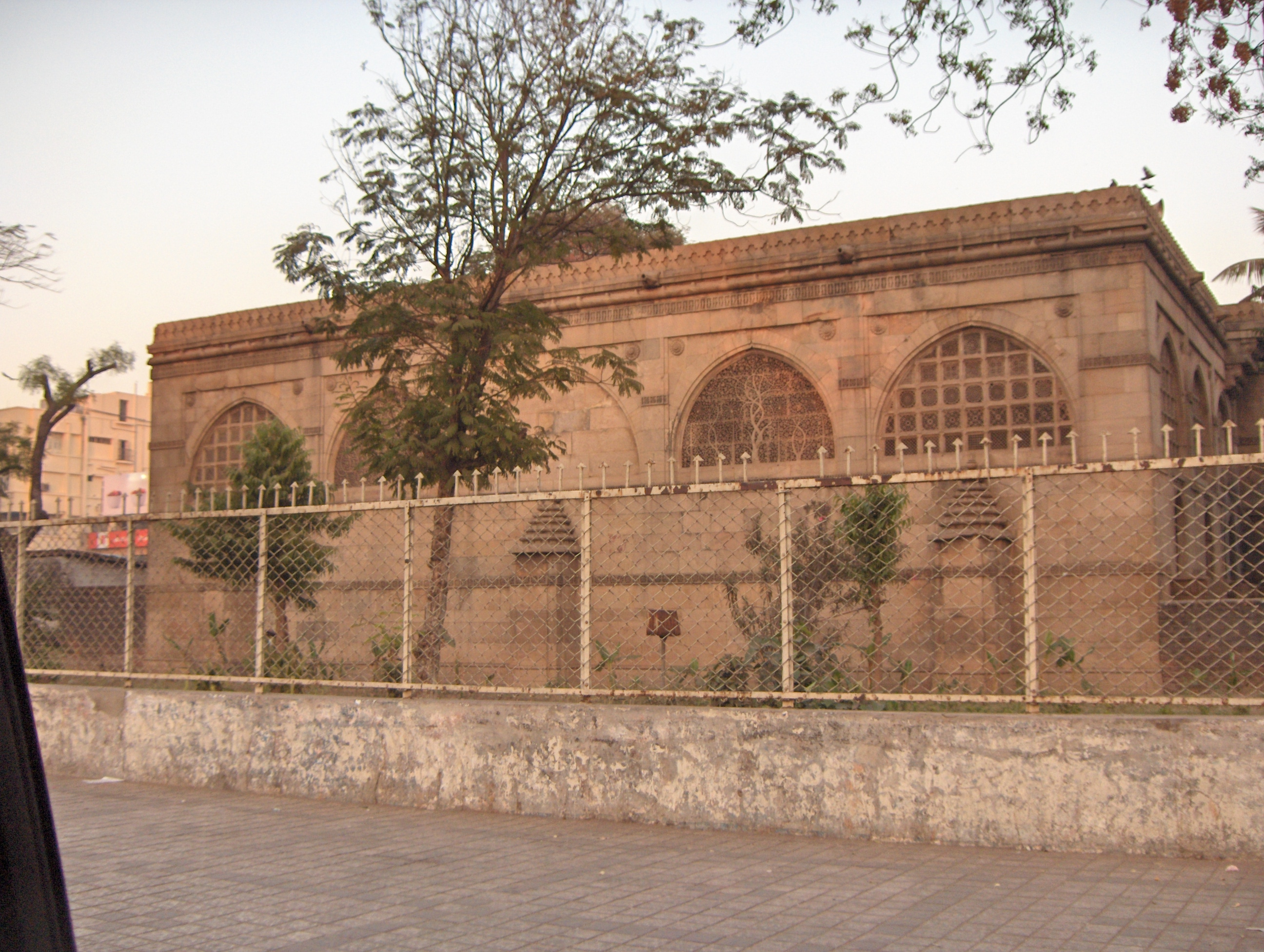
The Sidi Saiyyed mosque

== Births ==
- 13 May – Taj Bibi Bilqis Makani, later became the wife of Mughal Emperor Jahangir and mother of Mughal Emperor Shah Jahan (died 1619)

== See also ==
- Timeline of Indian history
