= 1569 in India =

- Centuries: 16th; 17th; 18th
- Decades: 1540s; 1550s; 1560s; 1570s; 1580s
- See also: List of years in India; Timeline of Indian history

Events from the year 1569 in India.

== Events ==
- 8 February – 21 March – Siege of Ranthambore
- Kuchera uprising against Mughal rule
- Sadasiva Raya rule as the emperor of Vijayanagara Empire ends with his death (started 1542)
- Aliya Rama Raya becomes emperor of Vijayanagara Empire

== Births ==
- Prince Salim (later named Jahangir) was born to Akbar.

== Deaths ==
- Sadasiva Raya, emperor of Vijayanagara Empire

== See also ==
- Timeline of Indian history
