= 1574 in India =

- Centuries: 15th; 16th; 17th; 18th
- Decades: 1550s; 1560s; 1570s; 1580s; 1590s
- See also: List of years in India; Timeline of Indian history

Events from the year 1574 in India.

== Events ==
- Bharmal's rule of Amber which started in 1548, comes to an end with his death and Bhagwant Das succeeds him

== Deaths ==
- 27 January – Bharmal, Kachwaha ruler of Amber dies (born c 1491)
- 1 September – Guru Amar Das, 3rd Sikh guru

== See also ==
- Timeline of Indian history
