= 1578 =

1578 in various calendars
- Gregorian calendar: 1578; MDLXXVIII
- Ab urbe condita: 2331
- Armenian calendar: 1027; ԹՎ ՌԻԷ
- Assyrian calendar: 6328
- Balinese saka calendar: 1499–1500
- Bengali calendar: 984–985
- Berber calendar: 2528
- English Regnal year: 20 Eliz. 1 – 21 Eliz. 1
- Buddhist calendar: 2122
- Burmese calendar: 940
- Byzantine calendar: 7086–7087
- Chinese calendar: 丁丑年 (Fire Ox); 4275 or 4068 — to — 戊寅年 (Earth Tiger); 4276 or 4069
- Coptic calendar: 1294–1295
- Discordian calendar: 2744
- Ethiopian calendar: 1570–1571
- Hebrew calendar: 5338–5339
- Hindu calendars
- Vikram Samvat: 1634–1635
- Shaka Samvat: 1499–1500
- Kali Yuga: 4678–4679
- Holocene calendar: 11578
- Igbo calendar: 578–579
- Iranian calendar: 956–957
- Islamic calendar: 985–986
- Japanese calendar: Tenshō 6 (天正６年)
- Javanese calendar: 1497–1498
- Julian calendar: 1578; MDLXXVIII
- Korean calendar: 3911
- Minguo calendar: 334 before ROC 民前334年
- Nanakshahi calendar: 110
- Thai solar calendar: 2120–2121
- Tibetan calendar: མེ་མོ་གླང་ལོ་ (female Fire-Ox); 1704 or 1323 or 551 — to — ས་ཕོ་སྟག་ལོ་ (male Earth-Tiger); 1705 or 1324 or 552

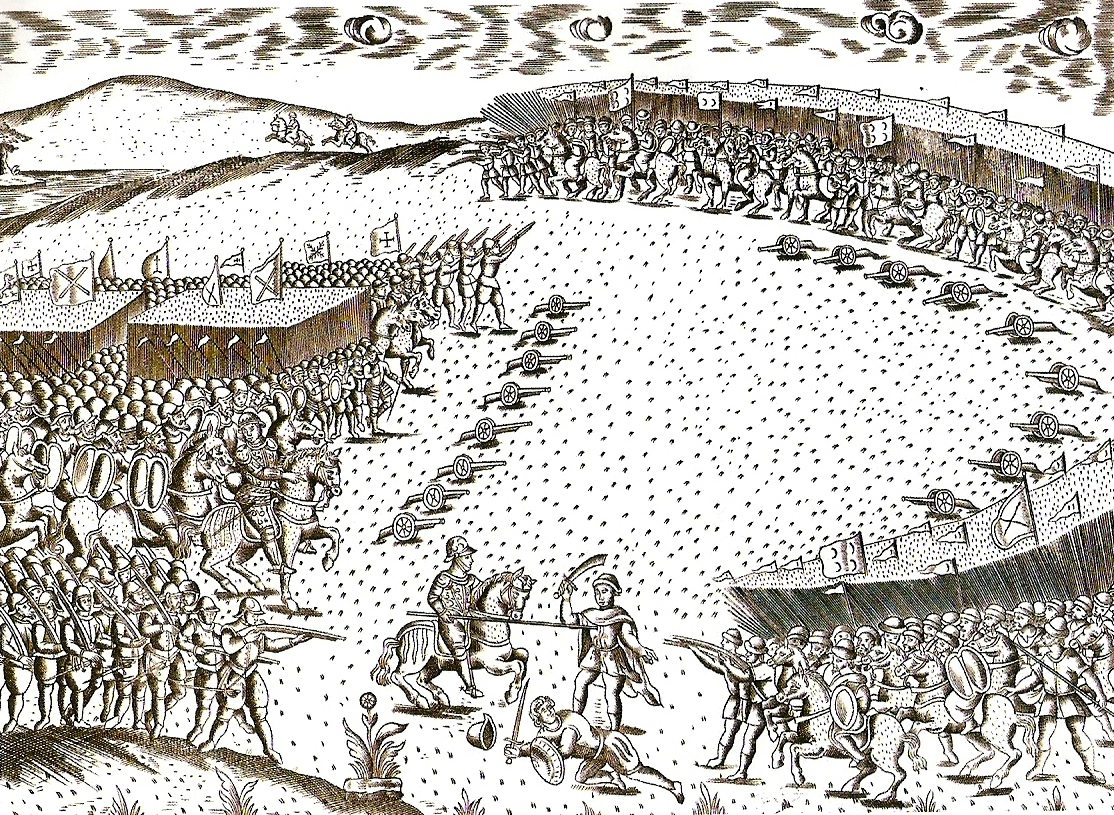
August 4: Battle of Alcácer Quibir

1578 (MDLXXVIII) was a common year starting on Wednesday in the Julian calendar.

== Events ==
=== January–March ===
- January 13 – The Siege of Gvozdansko ends in the Kingdom of Croatia as Ottoman Empire troops led by Ferhad Pasha Sokolović capture the fortress at Gvozdansko.
- January 31 – Battle of Gembloux: Spanish forces under Don John of Austria and Alexander Farnese defeat the Dutch; Farnese begins to recover control of the French-speaking Southern Netherlands.
- February 6 – Pope Gregory XIII issues the papal bull Illius fulti praesidio and creates the Diocese of Manila, the first Roman Catholic diocese in the Philippines, with Domingo de Salazar as the first Bishop of Manila. The diocese will be raised to the status of archdiocese on August 14, 1595.
- February 8 – The city council of Amsterdam in the Netherlands ratifies a treaty placing the city under the authority of Willem, Prince of Orange, and joining the States of Holland.
- February 12 – Mohammad Khodabanda, older brother of the late Shah Ismail II, begins his reign as the new Shah of Persia (now Iran) after entering the Persian capital at Qazvin, after removing his sister Pari Khan Khanum, who had exercised regal authority after Ismail's death. His first act as ruler is to have Pari Khan Khanum strangled to death.
- February 13 – Two days after the Battle of Gembloux, Spanish troops capture the city of Leuven, forcing Willem, Prince of Orange, to flee Brussels and relocate to Antwerp.Geoffrey Parker, The Dutch Revolt (Cornell University Press, 1977) p.186
- March 11 – Nicolò da Ponte is elected as the new Doge of the Republic of Venice after 44 ballots, following the March 3 death of Sebastiano Venier.
- March 20
  - James Douglas, 4th Earl of Morton, the last of the regents for King James VI of Scotland, resigns after having served as regent since November 24, 1572.
  - The Belgian city of Bruges, controlled by Spain, falls to Dutch rebels.

=== April–June ===
- April 23 – (17th day of 3rd month, Tensho 6) The Siege of Otate begins in Japan after the death of Uesugi Kenshin, the warlord of the Echigo Province.
- April 27 – The Duel of the Mignons claims the lives of two favorites of Henry III of France, and two favourites of Henry I, Duke of Guise.
- May 26 – The Alteratie takes place in Amsterdam, expelling the 24 Catholic members of the 40-man city government, and forming a new council is formed with 30 Calvinist Protestants and 10 Catholics.
- May 31 – Martin Frobisher sails from Harwich in England with 15 ships to North America, where he will arrive at Frobisher Bay in July on his third expedition.
- June 11 – Humphrey Gilbert is granted letters patent from the English crown to establish a colony in North America.
- June 20 – The Frobisher expedition reaches Greenland.
- June 30 – After having come into conflict on May 17 with his fellow officer, Thomas Doughty, during their circumnavigation of the world, Francis Drake puts Doughty on trial while the flagship Pelican is docked at what is now Argentina. A jury of sailors convicts Doughty of treason and attempted mutiny. Doughty is beheaded on July 2.

=== July–September ===
- July 2 – The Frobisher expedition reaches Canada and enters what is now Frobisher Bay. One of the ships, the Dennis, is wrecked on an iceberg.
- July 31
  - At the Battle of Rijmenam, fought near Antwerp in what is now Belgium, a combined Dutch and English force under the command of the Count of Boussu and England's John Norreys defeats Spanish troops commanded by Don Juan de Austria.
  - According to some accounts, Englishman Martin Frobisher holds the first Thanksgiving celebration by Europeans in Canada, on Newfoundland, after he and his fleet encounter two ships that they feared had been lost. However, the celebration involves no feast and is limited to a sermon by the expedition's minister and Frobisher's men giving praise.
- August 4 – Sebastian, King of Portugal is killed in the Battle of Alcácer Quibir in North Africa while fighting the Saadi Sultanate. Sebastian's elderly uncle, Cardinal Henry, is named as the heir to the throne, initiating a succession crisis in Portugal.
- August 20–September 6 – After renaming this flagship, Pelican to the Golden Hind, Francis Drake and his fleet begin their passage through the Strait of Magellan.
- August 31 – The Forbisher expedition departs North America for its journey back to England.
- September 6 – After 16 days travel, the fleet of Francis Drake completes its traverse of the Strait of Magellan between the tip of South America and Tierra del Fuego. Upon entering the Pacific Ocean, the fleet encounters violent storms. The supply ship Marigold, with over 100 men under the command of John Thomas, is lost with all hands off of Cape Horn. The rest of the fleet continues its voyage around the world.

=== October–December ===
- October 1 – Alessandro Farnese succeeds his uncle, Don John, as Governor of the Spanish Netherlands.
- October 21 – Battle of Wenden: The Russians are defeated by the Swedes, who proceed to take Polotsk.
- November 19 – Humphrey Gilbert and Walter Ralegh set out from Plymouth in England, leading an expedition to establish a colony in North America. They will be forced to turn back six months later.
- December 9 – After more than five years of combat in southern France, the Protestant Huguenot citadel of Ménerbes negotiates a surrender to its French Catholic attackers.

=== Date unknown ===
- Battle of the Spoiling Dyke at Trumpan on the Scottish Isle of Skye: the Clan MacLeod are victorious over the MacDonalds of Uist in a feud.
- The Ottoman Empire conquers Abkhazia.
- Sarsa Dengel, Emperor of Ethiopia, defeats and kills Bahr negus Yeshaq along with his Ottoman allies, finally ending his rebellion.
- Sonam Gyrso receives from Prince Atlan Khan the title of Talaï, and becomes the third Dalai Lama of Tibet.
- The last outbreak of sweating sickness occurs in England.
- The Portuguese assist Lord Ōmura Sumitada, the first Christian Japanese daimyo, in repulsing an assault on Nagasaki by the Ryūzōji clan.
- Fur trade begins in Newfoundland in North America.

== Births ==
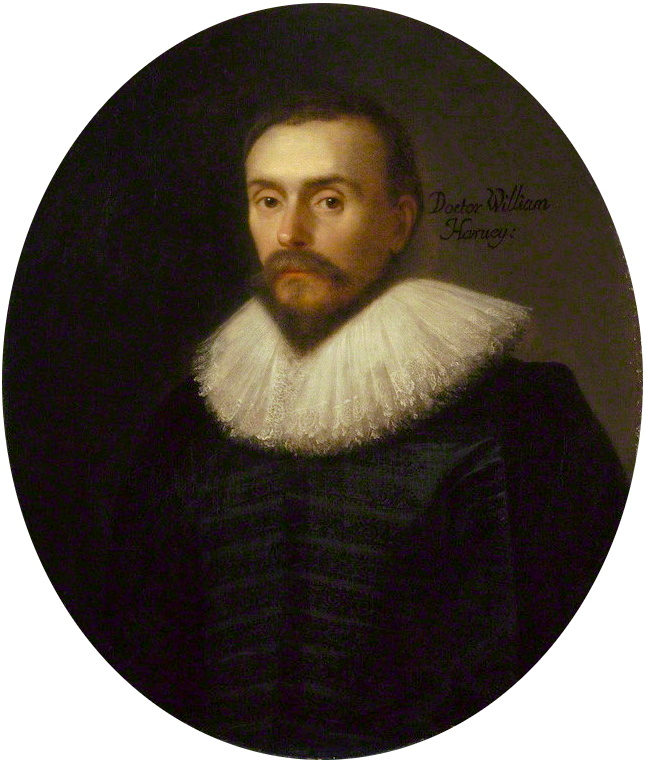
William Harvey

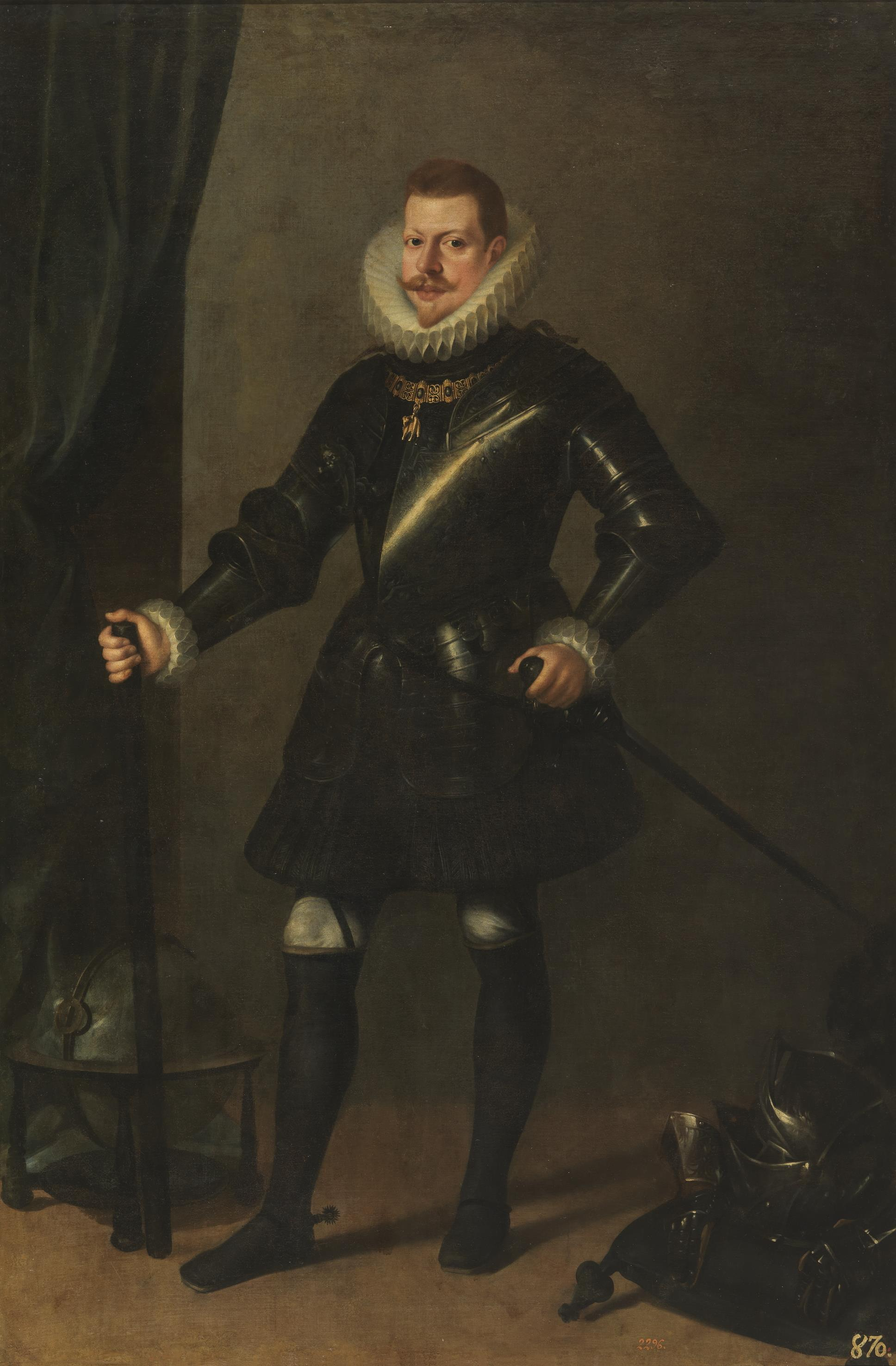
Philip III of Spain

- January 7 – Agnes of Solms-Laubach, Landgravine of Hesse-Kassel (d. 1602)
- January 10 – Christopher Clitherow, Lord Mayor of London and Member of Parliament (d. 1641)
- January 28 – Cornelius Haga, Dutch diplomat (d. 1654)
- March 18 – Adam Elsheimer, German artist working in Rome, who died at only thirty-two (d. 1610)
- April 1 – William Harvey, English physician (d. 1657)
- April 14 – King Philip III of Spain (d. 1621)
- April 17 – Maximilian van der Sandt, Dutch theologian (d. 1656)
- May 11 – Christian Günther I, Count of Schwarzburg-Sondershausen (1601–1642) (d. 1642)
- May 11 – Sophie Axelsdatter Brahe, Danish noblewoman (died 1646)
- June 5 – Claude, Duke of Chevreuse (d. 1657)
- June 13 – Thomas Finch, 2nd Earl of Winchilsea, Member of Parliament (d. 1639)
- July 9 – Ferdinand II, Holy Roman Emperor (d. 1637)
- July 21 – Philipp Hainhofer, German merchant, banker, diplomat and art collector (d. 1647)
- July 27 – Frances Howard, Duchess of Richmond, British duchess (d. 1639)
- July 31 – Countess Catharina Belgica of Nassau, regent of Hanau-Münzenberg (d. 1648)
- August 5 – Charles d'Albert, duc de Luynes, first duke of Chaulnes (d. 1621)
- August 10 – Matteo Rosselli, Italian painter (d. 1650)
- August 17
  - Francesco Albani, Italian painter (d. 1660)
  - Johann, Prince of Hohenzollern-Sigmaringen, first prince of Hohenzollern-Sigmaringen (d. 1638)
- August 24 – John Taylor, English poet who dubbed himself The Water Poet (d. 1653)
- September 11 – Vincenzo Maculani, Italian Catholic cardinal (d. 1667)
- September 17 – John Prideaux, English academic administrator and Anglican bishop (d. 1650)
- October 4 – Giovanni Francesco Guidi di Bagno, Italian Catholic cardinal (d. 1641)
- October 12 – Baldassare Aloisi, Italian painter (d. 1638)
- October 19 – Christine of Hesse-Kassel, Duchess of Saxe-Eisenach and Saxe-Coburg (d. 1658)
- November 4 – Wolfgang Wilhelm, Count Palatine of Neuburg, Duke of Jülich and Berg (1614–1635) (d. 1653)
- November 6 – Maximilian of Liechtenstein, Austrian nobleman and Imperial General (d. 1645)
- December 2 – Agostino Agazzari, Italian composer and music theorist (d. 1640)
- December 7 – Okaji no Kata, Japanese concubine of Tokugawa Ieyasu (d. 1642)
- December 20 – Henry of Lorraine, Duke of Mayenne, French noble (d. 1621)
- December 28 – Henry Bulstrode, English Member of Parliament (d. 1643)
- December 30 – Ulrik of Denmark, Danish prince-bishop (d. 1624)
- approx. date – Fede Galizia, Italian painter
- date unknown
  - Giambattista Andreini, Italian actor and playwright (d. 1650)
  - Yamada Arinaga, Japanese retainer of the Shimazu clan (d. 1668)
  - Benedetto Castelli, Italian scientist (d. 1643)
  - Thomas Coventry, 1st Baron Coventry, English lawyer (d. 1640)
  - Iwasa Matabei, Japanese painter (d. 1650)
  - Samuel Jordan, American colonial legislator (d. 1623)
  - Grzegorz IV Radziwiłł, Polish magnate (d. 1613)
  - François Ravaillac, killer of Henry IV of France (d. 1610)
  - Ambrose Rookwood, English Gunpowder Plot conspirator (d. 1606)
  - Francis Manners, 6th Earl of Rutland (d. 1632)
  - Horio Tadauji, Japanese daimyō (d. 1604)
  - Everard Digby, English conspirator (d. 1606)

== Deaths ==
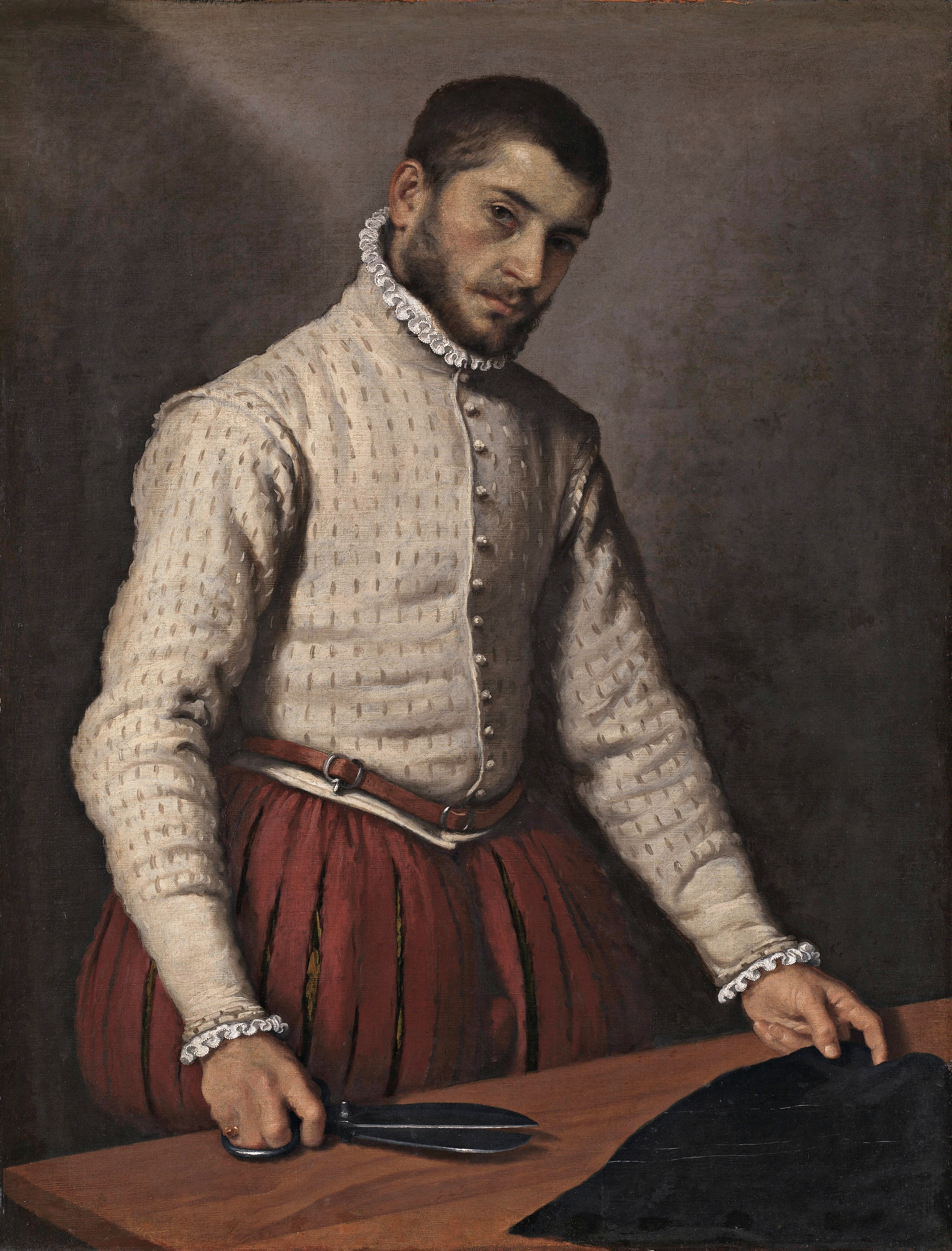
Giovanni Battista Moroni

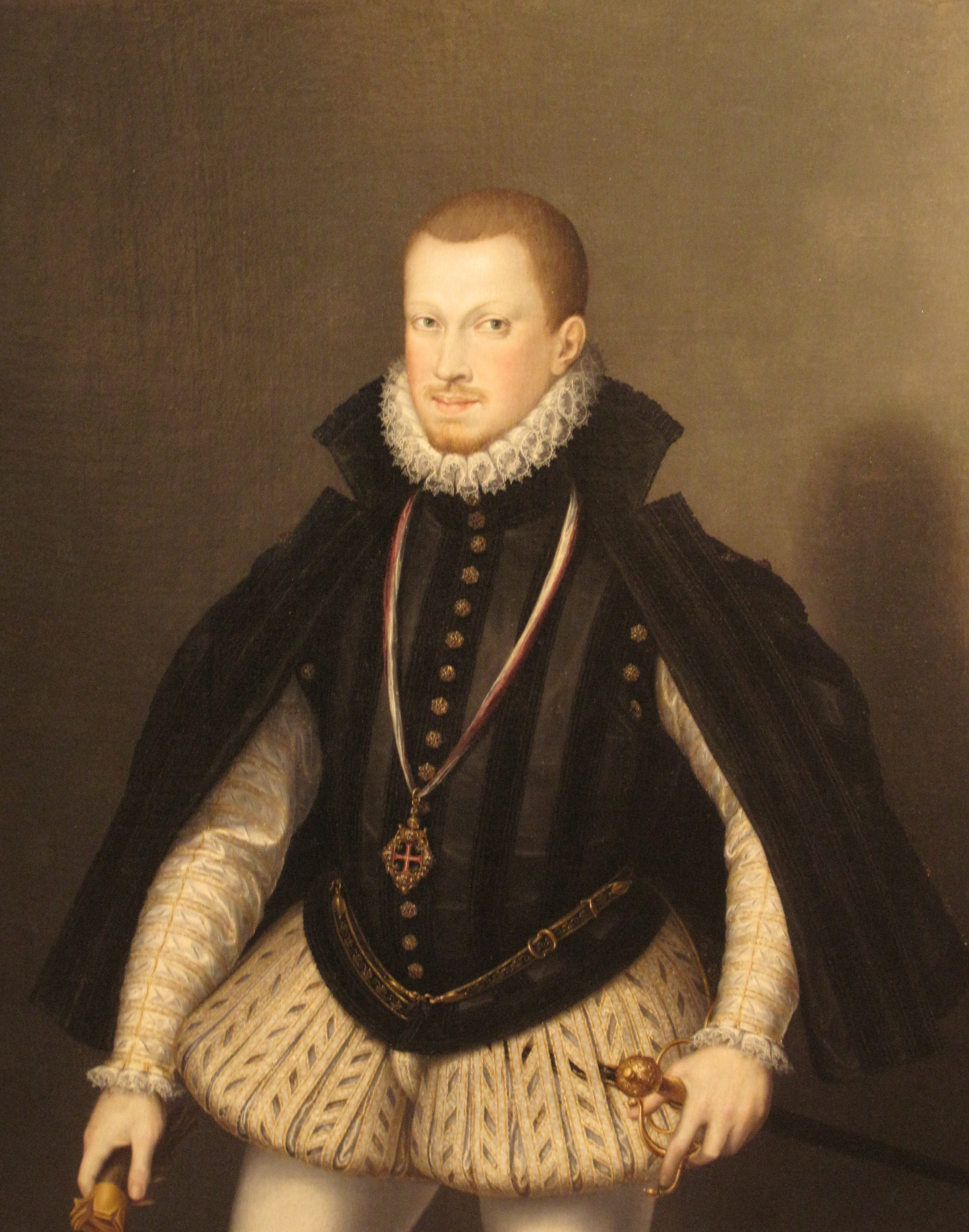
Sebastian, King of Portugal

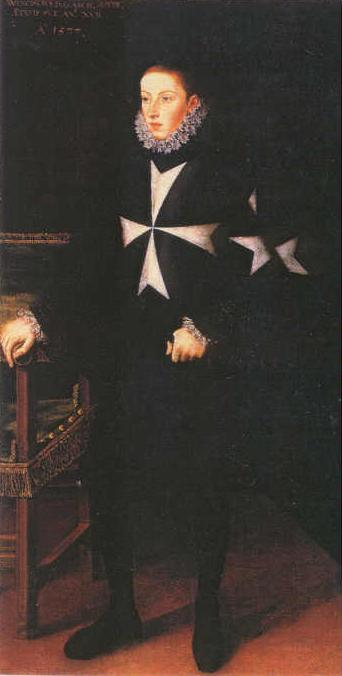
Archduke Wenceslaus of Austria

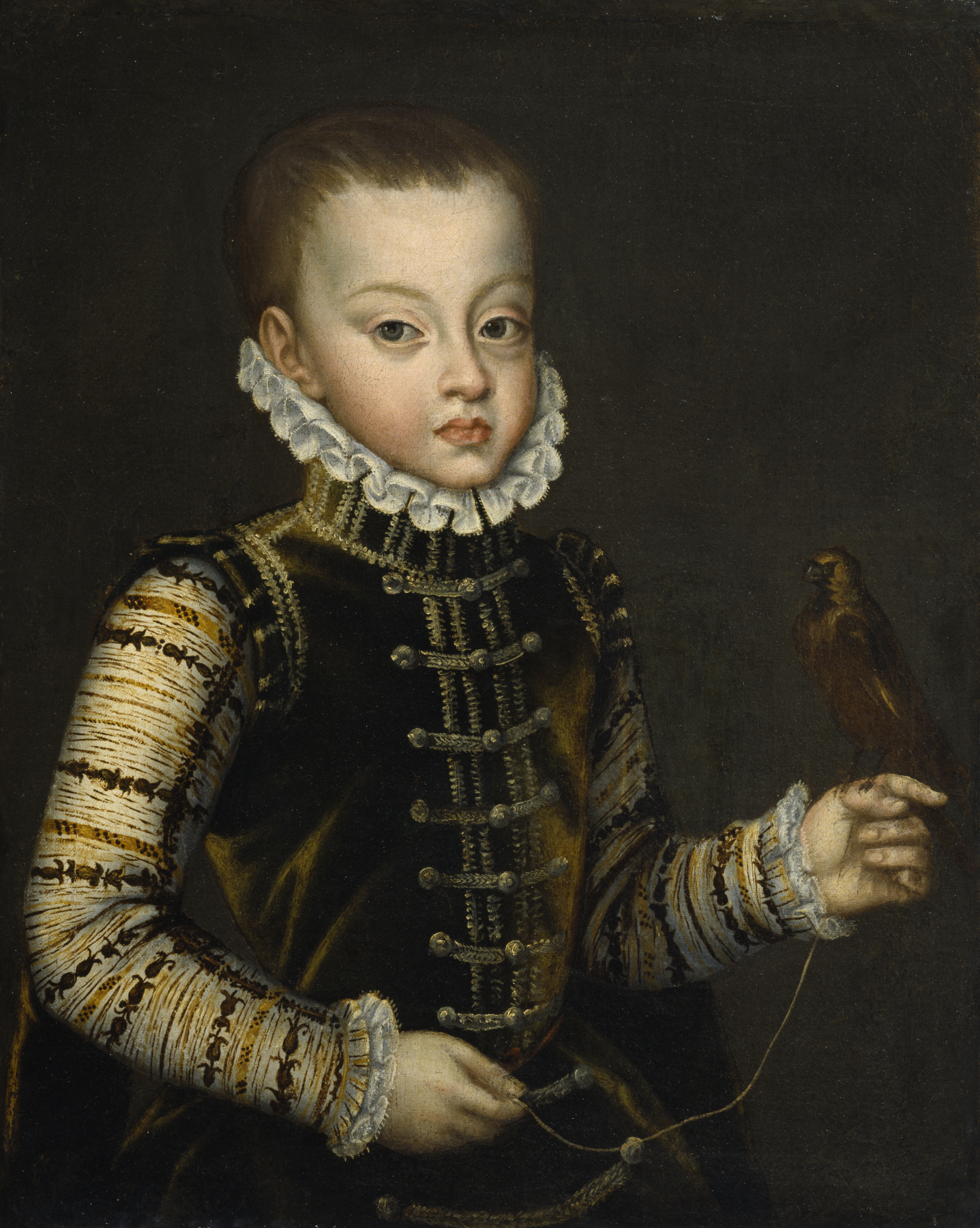
Ferdinand, Prince of Asturias

- January 5 – Giulio Clovio, Dalmatian painter (b. 1498)
- January 6 – Queen Inseong, Korean royal consort (b. 1514)
- January 25 – Mihrimah Sultan, Sultan Suleiman's daughter (b. 1522)
- February 5 or 1579 – Giovanni Battista Moroni, Italian painter (b. 1510)
- February 12 – Catherine of Austria, Queen of Portugal (b. 1507)
- March 3
  - Sebastiano Venier, Doge of Venice (b. 1496)
  - Michael Kantakouzenos Şeytanoğlu, Ottoman Greek magnate (b. 1510)
- March 7 – Margaret Douglas, Countess of Lennox (b. 1515)
- March 29
  - Arthur Champernowne, English admiral (b. 1524)
  - Louis I, Cardinal of Guise, French cardinal (b. 1527)
- April 2 – Marie Elisabeth of France, French princess (b. 1572)
- April 11 – Joanna of Austria, Grand Duchess of Tuscany, Austrian Archduchess (b. 1547)
- April 14 – James Hepburn, 4th Earl of Bothwell, consort of Mary, Queen of Scots (b. 1535)
- April 15 – Wolrad II, Count of Waldeck-Eisenberg (b. 1509)
- April 19 – Uesugi Kenshin, Japanese samurai and warlord (b. 1530)
- April 20 – Lady Mary Grey, English noblewoman (b.1545)
- May 4 – Martin Eisengrein, German theologian (b. 1535)
- June 16 – Ioan Potcoavă, Russian Cossack ataman
- July 2 – Thomas Doughty, English explorer (executed)
- July 5 – Cristoforo Madruzzo, Italian Catholic cardinal (b. 1512)
- July 27 – Jane Lumley, English translator (b. 1537)
- August 4
  - Sebastian, King of Portugal (b. 1554)
  - Thomas Stukley, English adventurer (b. 1525)
  - Abu Marwan Abd al-Malik I Saadi, King of Morocco
  - Abu Abdallah Mohammed II Saadi, King of Morocco
- August 8 – Amago Katsuhisa, Japanese nobleman (b. 1553)
- August 11 – Pedro Nunes, Portuguese mathematician (b. 1502)
- August 16 – Andrew Corbet, English landowner and politician (b. 1522)
- August 20 – Yamanaka Yukimori, Japanese samurai (b. 1545)
- September – Pierre Lescot, French architect (b. 1510)
- September 3 – Giulio della Rovere, Italian Catholic cardinal (b. 1533)
- September 22 – Archduke Wenceslaus of Austria (b. 1561)
- October 1 – Don John of Austria, military leader (b. 1547)
- October 12 – Cornelius Gemma, Dutch astronomer and astrologer (b. 1535)
- October 18 – Ferdinand, Prince of Asturias, Spanish prince (b. 1571)
- December 3 – Gonzalo II Fernández de Córdoba, Governor of the Duchy of Milan (b. 1520)
- December – Nicholas Heath, Archbishop of York and Lord Chancellor of England (b. 1501)
- date unknown – Sabina, Duchess of Bavaria (b. 1528)
