= 1564 in India =

- Centuries: 16th; 17th; 18th
- Decades: 1540s; 1550s; 1560s; 1570s; 1580s
- See also: List of years in India; Timeline of Indian history

Events from the year 1564 in India.

== Events ==
- 3 September – António de Noronha becomes viceroy of India (until 1568)

== Births ==
- 4 June – Ahmad Sirhindi, Indian Islamic scholar, (died 1624)

== Deaths ==
- 24 June – Rani Durgavati (born 1524).
- Rupa Goswami, devotional teacher and poet (born 1489).

== See also ==
- Timeline of Indian history
