= Gvozdansko Castle =

Castle ruins in Sisak-Moslavina County, Croatia

- Sisak-Moslavina County; Croatia
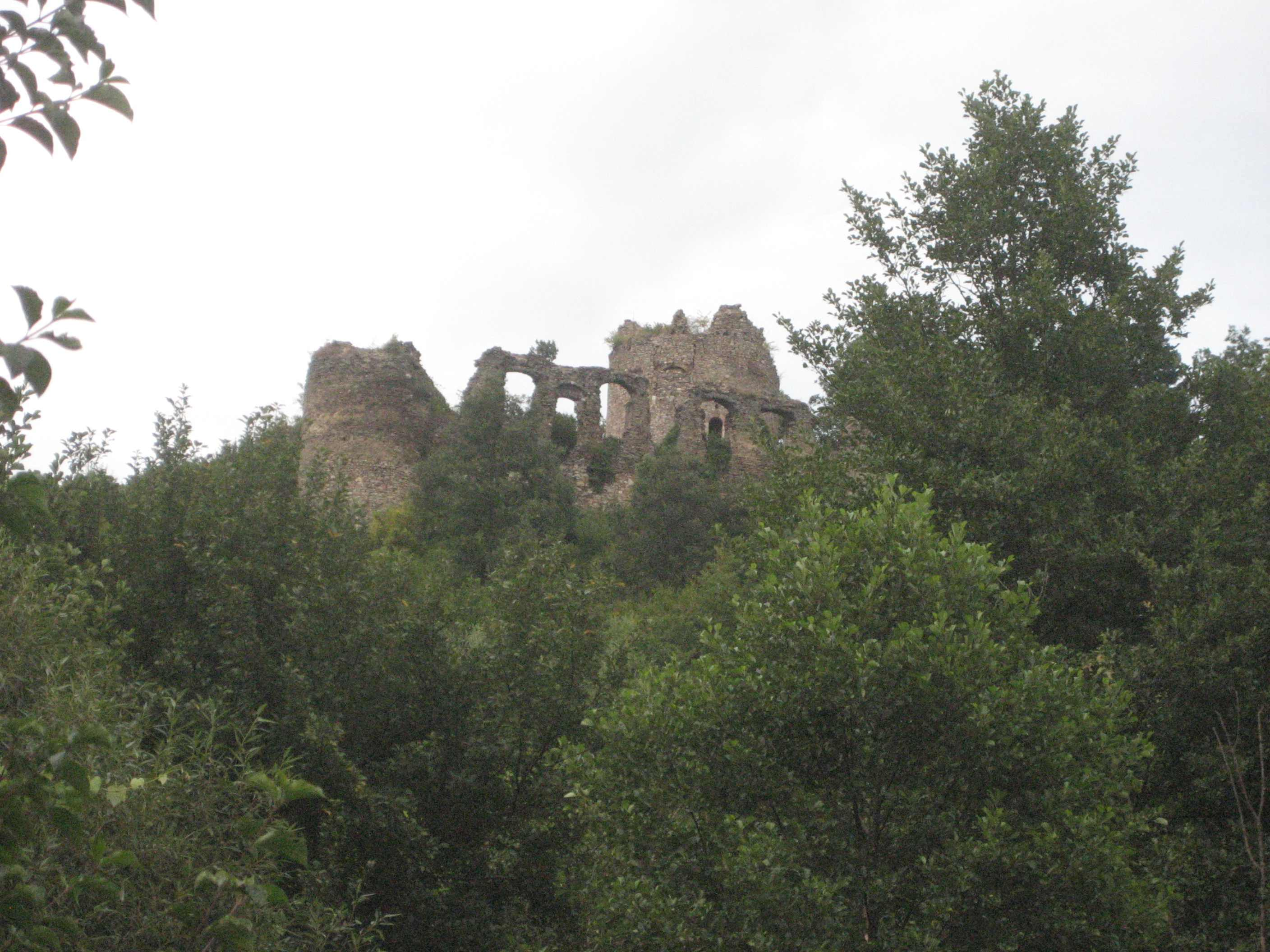
- Ruins of Gvozdansko Castle

Site information
- Type: Castle
- Controlled by: Zrinski noble family
- Condition: Ruins

Location
- Location in Croatia
- Coordinates: 45.133°N 16.215°E

Site history
- Built: 15th century
- Materials: Limestone

Gvozdansko Castle is a castle in Gvozdansko village, between the towns of Dvor and Glina and not far from Zrin Castle, in Sisak-Moslavina County, central Croatia.

== History ==
The Gvozdansko Castle was probably built in the second half of the 15th century, due to mining rights of Croatian Zrinski noble family. The castle was first mentioned in 1488. Nikola III Zrinski and his son Nikola Šubić Zrinski frequently came to Gvozdansko in order to inspect the mines and the mint.

The Turks attempted to conquer the Gvozdansko Castle on several occasions. Three major attempts were made in 1561 by Malkoč-beg, in 1574 by Ferhad-beg, and in 1576 by Kapidži-pasha. The final siege by Ferhat-paša Sokolović with 10,000 soldiers, which was fought from 3 October 1577 to 13 January 1578, was much better prepared. That Siege of Gvozdansko ended with an Ottoman victory, after long and bloody siege. Ottomans managed to break into castle only after last defenders froze to death in harsh winter, having no wood or anything else to light the fire, on 13 January 1578. Ottoman rule in Gvozansko lasted until 1718. Ottoman commander was stunned by the brave Croatian defenders, after witnessing frozen bodies of defenders still holding their muskets on combat positions in the ruined castle.

== See also ==
- List of castles in Croatia
