= 1562 in India =

- Centuries: 15th; 16th; 17th; 18th
- Decades: 1540s; 1550s; 1560s; 1570s; 1580s
- See also: List of years in India; Timeline of Indian history

Events from the year 1562 in India.

== Events ==
- February 1562: Mughal emperor Akbar's marriage to a Rajput princess, Mariam-uz-Zamani, daughter of Raja Bharmal of Amber.
- Emperor Akbar's conquest of Malwa.
- In Rajputana, Akbar made peace with the Rajputs. The Hindu leaders were allowed to keep their land, if they accepted Akbar as the ruler.
- May 1562: Mughal general Adham Khan executed for the murder of Shams-ud-Din Ataga Khan, another Mughal general.

== See also ==
- Timeline of Indian history
