= 1572 in India =

- Centuries: 15th; 16th; 17th; 18th
- Decades: 1550s; 1560s; 1570s; 1580s; 1590s
- See also: List of years in India; Timeline of Indian history

Events from the year 1572 in India.

== Events ==
- Akbar annexes Gujarat and shifts the Mughal capital to Fatehpur Sikri.

== Deaths ==
- 28 February – Maharana Udai Singh, king of Mewar and the founder of the city of Udaipur, (born 1522)

== See also ==
- Timeline of Indian history
