= 1570 in India =

- Centuries: 15th; 16th; 17th; 18th
- Decades: 1550s; 1560s; 1570s; 1580s; 1590s
- See also: List of years in India; Timeline of Indian history

Events from the year 1570 in India.

== Events ==
- War of the League of the Indies begins

== Births ==
- Sengge Namgyal, Namgyal dynasty King of Ladakh (died 1642)

== See also ==
- Timeline of Indian history
