= 1563 in India =

- Centuries: 15th; 16th; 17th; 18th
- Decades: 1540s; 1550s; 1560s; 1570s; 1580s
- See also: List of years in India; Timeline of Indian history

Events from the year 1563 in India.

== Events ==
- Colóquios dos simples e drogas da India, a discussion on Indian drugs, by Garcia de Orta is first published.

== Births ==
- 15 April – Guru Arjan Dev, Sikh guru, is born (dies 1606)
- Steven van der Hagen, first admiral of the Dutch East India Company is born in Amersfoort (dies 1621)

== Deaths ==
- Gaspar Correia, a Portuguese historian and author of 'Lendas da Índia ( "Legends of India"), dies (born c. 1486)

== See also ==
- Timeline of Indian history
