= 1567 in India =

- Centuries: 16th; 17th; 18th
- Decades: 1540s; 1550s; 1560s; 1570s; 1580s
- See also: List of years in India; Timeline of Indian history

Events from the year 1569 in India.

== Events ==
- October until the end of the year – Chittorgarh Fort Siege of 1567, now a heritage site.

== Deaths ==
- Ali ibn Abd-al-Malik al-Hindi, Indian Sunni Muslim scholars of Islam. One of his famous works is Kanz Ul Ummaal.

== See also ==
- Timeline of Indian history
