= Siege of Gvozdansko =

Part of the Hundred Years' Croatian-Ottoman War

- Part of the Hundred Years' Croatian–Ottoman War
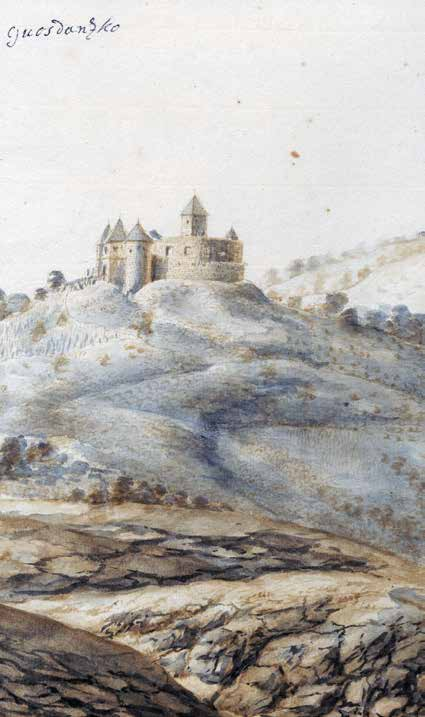
- Gvozdansko Castle on a 1729 painting
Date	3 October 1577 – 13 January 1578
Location	Gvozdansko, Kingdom of Croatia, Habsburg monarchy 45°07′59″N 16°12′54″E
Result	Ottoman victory
Territorial changes	Gvozdansko captured by the Ottoman Empire

Belligerents
Habsburg Monarchy: Kingdom of Croatia	Ottoman Empire

Commanders and leaders
Damjan Doktorović †; Juraj Gvozdanović †; Nikola Ožegović †; Andrija Stepšić †	Ferhad Pasha Sokolović

Strength
300 soldiers and miners	5,000–10,000 soldiers

Casualties and losses
Entire garrison killed	Unknown

The siege of Gvozdansko (Croatian: Opsada Gvozdanskog) was an Ottoman siege of the fort of Gvozdansko in the Kingdom of Croatia in 1577–1578. In the 1570s, the Ottomans intensified their efforts to capture the valley of the Una River. A string of forts along the Una, centred around Gvozdansko and in possession of the Zrinski noble family, formed the main line of defense of Croatia since 1527. The fort held off Ottoman attacks in 1540 and 1561.

In 1575, Ferhad Bey Sokolović, Sanjak-bey of Bosnia, began an offensive on central Croatia. By the end of 1576, the defense system on the Una collapsed and most of the forts in the valley were captured, including Bužim and Cazin. While Gvozdansko withheld an attack in June after three days of fighting, the attack left the walls of the fort damaged. Ferhad Bey renewed the campaign in September 1577 and attacked the remaining Croatian-held forts in the area. The Ottoman army besieged Gvozdansko on 3 October, whose garrison numbered 300 soldiers and miners, under the command of Damjan Doktorović and three other Croatian captains. With the capture of the nearby fort of Zrin on 20 December, Gvozdansko was left completely isolated. Due to a lack of troops, there were no attempts to relieve Gvozdansko.

The final phase of the siege began in early January 1578. Around 5,000 Ottoman troops were involved in the siege, and a similar number were positioned at the approaches to Gvozdansko. Calls for the surrender of the fort were rejected. Three major Ottoman assaults were repelled from 10 to 12 January. By the final day of the siege, on 13 January, the entire Croatian garrison was dead and Ottoman forces entered the fort in the early morning. Gvozdansko and most of the Una Valley were briefly recaptured by Croatian and other Habsburg forces during a counter-offensive in the summer of 1578. Their gains were annulled by Ferhad Bey in late September. The Ottoman Empire controlled Gvozdansko until 1685. Ottomans recaptured it in 1690. But, it was definitely captured by Austrians in 1718.

== Background ==
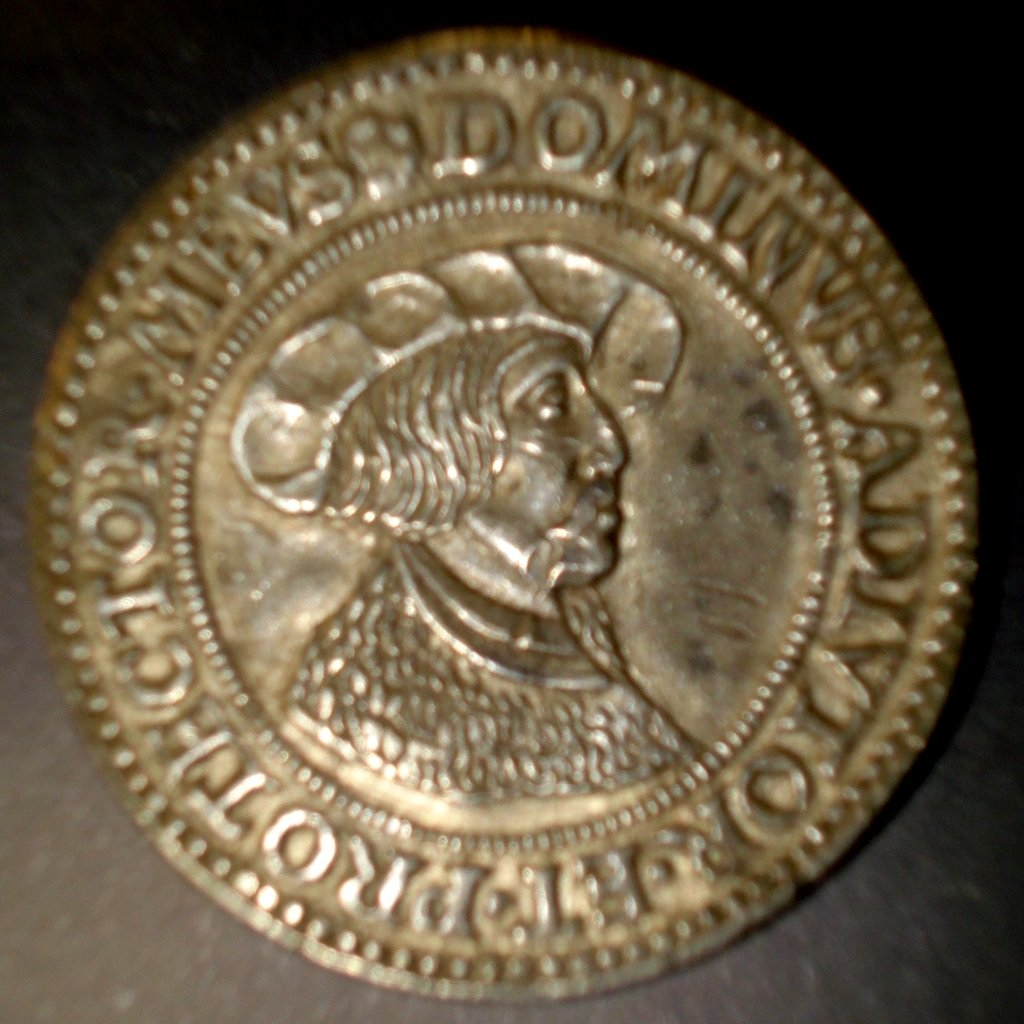
Croatian nobleman Nikola III Zrinski on a silver coin minted in Gvozdansko

In 1526, Ottoman forces led by Sultan Suleiman the Magnificent defeated a large Hungarian-led Christian force at the Battle of Mohács. As King Louis II died in battle and had no heir, both the Kingdom of Hungary and the Kingdom of Croatia, which were in a personal union, became disputed territories between Ferdinand I, Archduke of Austria, from the House of Habsburg, and John Zápolya, Voivode of Transylvania. A civil war ensued, which enabled the Ottomans to gain more territory in Hungary. Most of the Croatian nobility backed the Habsburgs, expecting aid in the wars with the Ottoman Empire. Zápolya received military assistance from Suleiman.

Following the fall of the Banate of Jajce in 1527, the main line of Croatian defense moved to the valley of the Una River, where Gvozdansko was one of the main fortifications. Gvozdansko was a rectangular fort in possession of the Zrinski family, located on the main road between the towns of Dvor and Glina. It had four towers on its corners and a larger tower opposite the entrance, which had four floors and was 10 meters in diameter. The fort had two longer walls around 25 meters in length, and two shorter walls with a length of around 15 and 18 meters. Gvozdansko was first mentioned in 1488 and was built to protect the nearby mines of iron, copper, lead, and silver. The extraction of silver in Gvozdansko began in the late 15th and early 16th centuries, when Nikola III, who usually resided in Gvozdansko, was the head of the Zrinski family. The Zrinskis also minted their own silver coins in Gvozdansko. The silver mines in their possessions yielded an annual income of 30,000 florins, according to reports from Nikola III. With the growth of their wealth and influence, the family gained more land in the valley of the Una, such as the towns of Kostajnica, Krupa, and Dubica, on the right bank of the Una. The fort of Zrin, which gave the name to the Zrinski family, was located northeast of Gvozdansko. In 1534, Nikola III died, and his wife Helen, and two sons, Nikola IV (commonly known as Nikola Šubić Zrinski) and Ivan I, took the role of governing the family possessions.

There were no major incursions into Croatia from 1534 to 1536. In the summer of 1536, Ghazi Husrev Bey, Sanjak-bey of Bosnia, began an offensive north of the Sava River. By January 1537, he captured the city of Požega. In the space of six months, over half of Slavonia was under Ottoman control, from Valpovo to the fort of Jasenovac at the mouth of the Una into the Sava. Husrev Bey then attacked the lower Una and captured Dubica in January or early February 1537. Shortly after the fall of Dubica, the Croatian nobility met in Zagreb to evaluate their defensive capabilities, and pointed out the lack of military forces and financial difficulties. The Zrinskis started enrolling their miners as soldiers, and were able to take back Dubica in the same year. The Ottomans regained initiative in the war following the failure of Johann Katzianer's campaign in Ottoman-held Slavonia in October 1537. They recaptured Dubica in May 1538. As Suleiman was busy with the war with Venice, the activities on the Ottoman–Croatian border calmed down until October 1539, when Zrinski had Katzianer executed for siding with Zápolya and negotiating the surrender of Kostajnica to the Ottomans. Suleiman threatened retaliation if Zrinski was not punished by Ferdinand.

The Habsburgs managed to negotiate a six-month peace treaty in Constantinople, starting with 1 January 1540, but clashes on the border did not stop. Croatian forces led by Zrinski again took control of Dubica in late January 1540. The Ottomans responded with an attack on Pakrac. Croatian Ban Petar Keglević sent an army to help Zrinski, but immediately called it off at the request of Queen Anne, in order not to violate the agreed armistice. A retaliatory attack against Zrinski was carried out by Husrev Bey, Murat Bey Tardić, Sanjak-bey of Klis, and Mehmed Bey Jahjapašić from the Sanjak of Smederevo. The main targets were Kostajnica, which was briefly captured, and Zrin and Gvozdansko, which held off attacks. The offensive, which began in early May, ended in mid June, on Husrev Bey's orders. The Zrinskis reported that all of the mines near Gvozdansko were destroyed. Following the death of Zápolya in June 1540, the war mainly took place in Hungary.

In late 1540, Ferdinand approved more money to Zrinski for military purposes. Two years later, Zrinski was named Ban of Croatia, in place of Keglević, who was removed from office for obtaining possessions of his daughter's late husband. Ottoman raids in the Una Valley continued in 1544. Zrinski transferred the family center from Zrin to Čakovec in the Međimurje region in 1546. In June 1547, a five-year peace treaty was concluded between Ferdinand and Suleiman. The treaty was respected on both sides. Rüstem Pasha, Grand Vizier of the Ottoman Empire, unsuccessfully tried to get Zrinski excluded from the treaty, due to his raids of Ottoman lands in earlier years.

== Frontier on the Una River ==
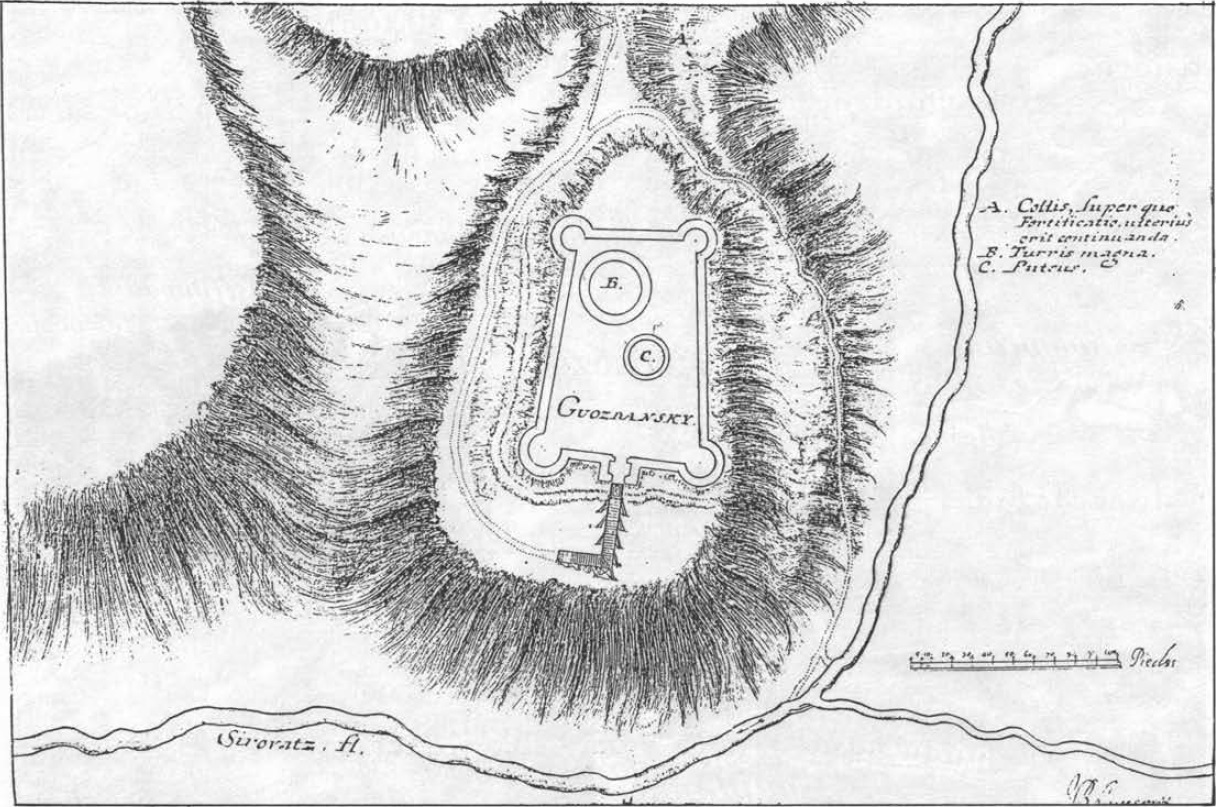
Ground plan of the Gvozdansko fort, made by Luigi Ferdinando Marsigli in 1699

In mid-16th century, the Una Valley was a part of the Croatian sector of the Military Frontier defense system. The formation of this defense system, extending from the Adriatic Sea to Transylvania, took place in the decades following the Habsburg arrival to power. In the 1550s, there was still no central control over the Croatian Frontier and the border forts were mostly run by local nobles. The forts in possession of the Zrinski family had considerable autonomy and were not a part of the administrative structure of the Croatian Frontier.

In 1552, as the peace treaty came to an end, the sanjak-beys of Bosnia, Herzegovina, and Klis received orders from Constantinople to mobilize their forces near Banja Luka. Under the command of Ulama Bey of Požega, the Ottoman army captured two important fortified towns north of the Sava, Virovitica and Čazma, and came within 35 miles from Zagreb. The Ottomans then concentrated their attacks on the well-defended Una Valley. Their plan was to establish a foothold on the left bank of the Una, make a breakthrough between the Una and Kupa rivers, and cross the Kupa towards Zagreb. This was to be coordinated with Ottoman activities in southern Hungary, where they intended to capture Szigetvár and march towards Kanizsa. The conquest of the remaining Croatian territory between the Drava and Sava rivers would make it easier to carry out future attacks on the Archduchy of Austria.

In June 1556, Malkoč Bey, Sanjak-bey of Klis, captured Kostajnica, a Croatian stronghold on the lower Una. He took the opportunity while Zrinski and other Habsburg forces were engaged in southern Hungary, where battles were fought around Babócsa and Szigetvár. With the conquest of Kostajnica, the Ottomans broke through the defensive line on the Una River. The Croatian garrison in the fort of Novi, southwest of Kostajnica, set fire to the fort and abandoned it. Following the fall of Kostajnica, Zrinski resigned from the position of ban. Péter Erdődy succeeded him in December. Emperor Ferdinand entrusted the Croatian and Slavonian sectors of the Military Frontier to Croatian captain Ivan Lenković. The military activities of Lenković, Erdődy, and Zrinski prevented further loss of territory.

The 2nd half 1559 and the winter of 1560 were mostly peaceful. On 3 March 1560, the Croatian Parliament met in Zagreb. Ferdinand's proposal to abandon and destroy the forts of Gvozdansko, Zrin, Slunj, and several others in the Una Valley due to their vulnerability was rejected during the parliament's session. Hostilities resumed in spring. While Lenković's and Zrinski's forces were able to defeat two Ottoman raiding groups, Ottoman casualties in these confrontations were low.

In April 1561, an 8,000-strong Ottoman army under the command of Malkoč Bey besieged Gvozdansko, which had a garrison of 100 men under the command of captain Toma Lukašić and was well supplied with food, water, and ammunition. An army led by Lenković came to relieve Gvozdansko, and Ottoman forces withdrew. An eight-year peace treaty was signed in 1562 in Constantinople, although a coordinated assault carried out by Erdődy and Zrinski early in the year, on Ottoman-held regions of Moslavina and Podravina, jeopardized the peace negotiations. Malkoč Bey was transferred to the new position of sanjak-bey of Herzegovina. The peace treaty was broken in 1564, after fighting broke out between the Habsburgs and John Sigismund Zápolya, the son of John Zápolya, who ruled in parts of Hungary with Suleiman's support.

Activities on the Una frontier resumed in 1565, when the fort of Krupa surrendered to a force led by Mustafa Pasha Sokolović, who was appointed Bosnian sanjak-bey a year earlier. With the capture of Krupa, the main supply route to Bihać was cut off and the town's flank was exposed. Instead of attacking Bihać, Mustafa Pasha went north and in 1566 joined Suleiman in his campaign through Hungary. The main target of the campaign was Szigetvár, which was defended by Zrinski, the captain of the fortress since 1561. Both Zrinski and Suleiman died during the month-long siege. Erdödy tried to take advantage of the absence of Ottoman troops in Bosnia and attacked Novi. The sanjaks of Požega and Klis sent an army to relieve Novi, but suffered a heavy defeat. The fort nonetheless managed to repel the Croatian attack. Ottoman Grand Vezir Sokollu Mehmed Pasha, who held the position from 1566 to 1579, concluded that a halt was needed in their military activities.

Erdődy died in 1567. Lenković retired from the position of captain in the same year due to illness. Bishop Juraj Drašković was appointed the new ban, together with count Franjo Frankopan Slunjski. Drašković held the position until 1578, while Frankopan served as co-ban until 1572. Emperor Maximilian II, who succeeded Ferdinand in 1564, sought no further confrontation with the Ottoman Empire and concluded an eight-year peace deal with the High Porte in February 1568. The treaty, which forbade raids, but allowed the fortification of the border area, was not respected on the Ottoman–Croatian border. Both Croatians and their Austrian allies, with help from the Uskoks, and local Ottoman sanjaks carried out incursions across the border. Ottoman attacks largely targeted the strategically important fort of Hrastovica near Sisak, which would enable them to cross the Kupa.

Extraordinary tax measures were introduced by the Croatian Parliament to strengthen the border forts, including Hrastovica, which withheld two Ottoman assaults in 1568 and 1571. Despite the confrontations, the front line remained stable throughout the 2nd half of the 1560s and the 1st half of the 1570s.

== Prelude ==
Map of Croatia and Ottoman expansion at the beginning of 1576

In early 1573, a large peasant revolt broke out in northwest Croatia, in the vicinity of Zagreb. The rebellion was quickly suppressed, but with heavy casualties. The revolt further worsened the financial and military situation in the kingdom. The Ottoman Empire concluded a peace treaty with Venice in March 1573, which enabled local sanjak-beys to direct more forces towards Croatia. Throughout 1573 and 1574, Ottoman raids increasingly targeted the area between the Una and the Kupa. In May 1574, the Croatian Parliament adopted a plan to strengthen the frontier forts and recruit new forces. The parliament also introduced new levies. These measures did not have a significant effect on the overall state of the defense, and were a large financial burden on the population.

In December 1574, Gašpar Alapić was named co-Ban of Croatia, alongside Drašković. Sultan Selim II died in the same month and was succeeded by his son Murad III. Ferhad Bey Sokolović, who became the sanjak-bey of Bosnia in 1574, and would become a pasha six years later, led several offensives on border forts during 1575, including an unsuccessful attack on Bihać. In September 1575, he defeated an army led by Herbard VIII von Auersperg, the commander of the Croatian Frontier, who was killed in the battle of Budački. In the same month, Ferhad Bey's troops captured the fort of Bila Stina on the left bank of the Una, located between Cazin and Ostrožac, which enabled an Ottoman breakthrough towards the Korana, Mrežnica, and Kupa rivers.

In April 1576, around 7,000 Ottoman troops attacked Hrastovica, but the town's garrison repelled the attack. In June, the Ottomans captured the town of Bužim, southwest of Gvozdansko, and immediately started attacking Gvozdansko, whose garrison numbered 120–130 men. The Ottomans retreated after three days of heavy fighting, when reinforcements led by captain Johann Auersperg arrived. The fort's walls on the east side were partially breached by Ottoman artillery.

The town of Cazin was captured on 18 July. More than fifty incursions into Croatia were recorded during 1576. By the end of the year, most of the area between the Una and the Glina River was under Ottoman control. The difficult situation in the kingdom was also affected by the unclear position of the banship, as both Alapić and Drašković asked the Emperor to relieve them of their duties. The banship was then offered to captain Krsto Ungnad, whose terms, regarding the salary and number of soldiers allocated to the ban, were rejected by Maximilian. On 12 October, Maximilian died and his son, Rudolf II, succeeded him. Rudolf persuaded both Drašković and Alapić to continue performing their duties. On 25 December, Habsburg and Ottoman representatives signed an eight-year peace treaty. Despite the renewal of peace, the High Porte did not restrict the activities of Ferhad Bey in Croatia to secure land across the Una.

== Siege ==
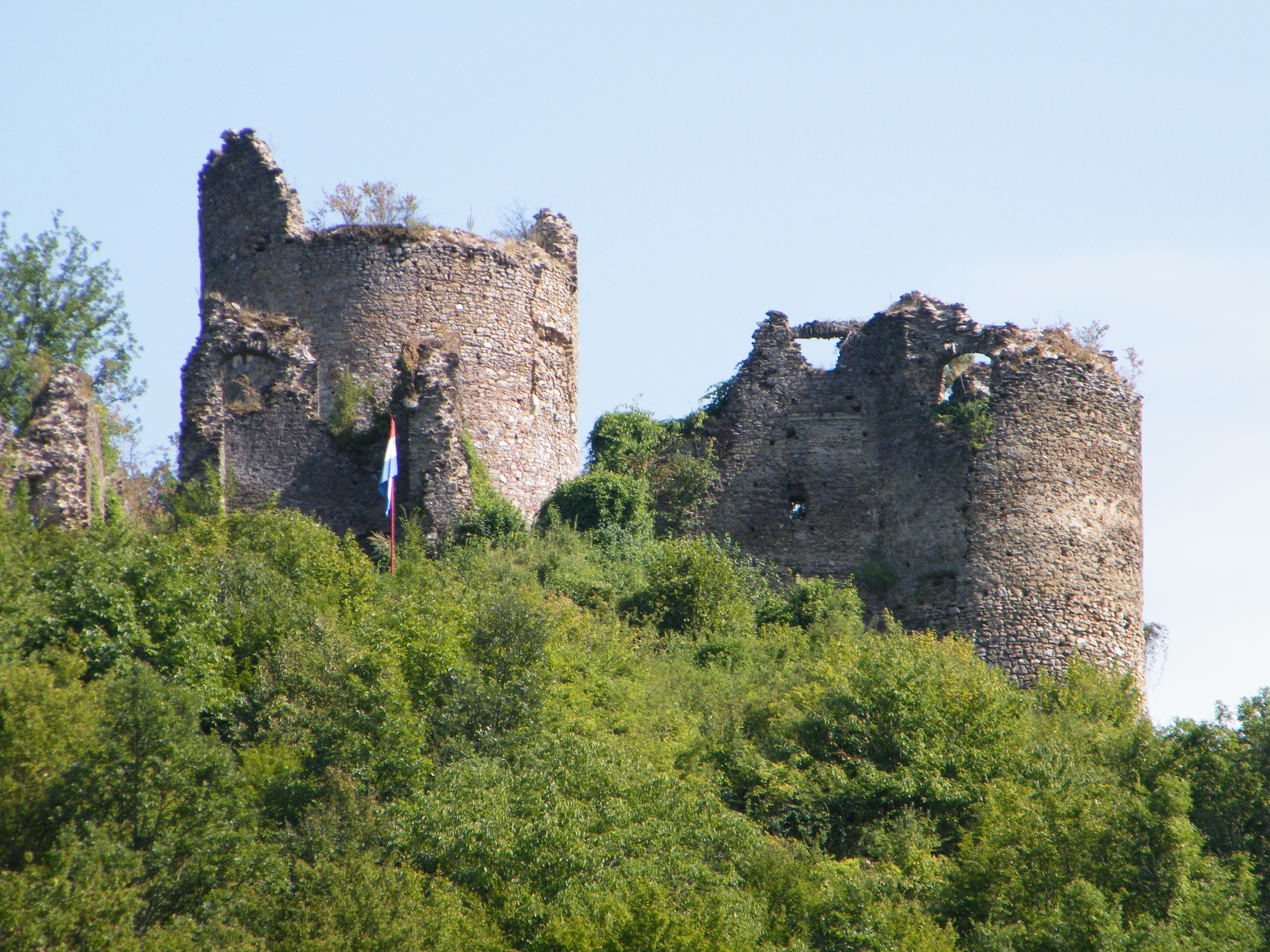
Ruins of the Gvozdansko Castle in 2013

Ferhad Bey's offensive resumed in September 1577, when he personally led an army to capture the remaining forts up to the Glina River, north of Cazin. On 3 October, these forces besieged Gvozdansko. The Ottoman army brought more than 30 cannons, including seven wall-breaching cannons. The fort was defended by around 300 men, mostly miners and Croatian light infantry (haramias), the fort guard, and some gunsmiths from Carniola, who received no supplies since August. According to a 1577 report on the status of the frontier forts, Gvozdansko had 80 haramias stationed there and no cavalrymen. The garrison was under the command of four experienced captains: Damjan Doktorović, Jure Gvozdanović, Nikola Ožegović, and Andrija Stepšić. One soldier managed to pass through Ottoman lines and reach the Croatian-held town of Steničnjak, where captain Johann Auersperg was stationed. Due to the lack of soldiers, Auersperg did not attempt to relieve Gvozdansko. He expected that Gvozdansko would be able to withstand the siege until winter, and that the Ottoman army would not remain there that long. Ferhad Bey deployed the artillery on surrounding hills and ordered a prolonged bombardment of the fort. All approaches to Gvozdansko were blocked. A part of the Ottoman army was left to keep Gvozdansko under siege, while Ferhad Bey led the rest and attacked the remaining Croatian forts in the region. He captured Ostrožac on 13 November. After a short siege, the fort of Zrin surrendered on 20 December. The fall of Zrin left Gvozdansko completely surrounded by Ottoman held forts and towns.

The main part of the Ottoman army joined the besieging force near Gvozdansko at the end of December. Around 5,000 troops encamped around Gvozdansko, and about the same number of troops were guarding the approaches to the fort. By that time, the fort was under siege for more than two months. The garrison lacked ammunition and suffered from hunger, thirst, and cold, while many died or were wounded in combat. All calls for surrender were rejected. Three major assaults on Gvozdansko were repelled on 10, 11, and 12 January 1578, leaving only 25–30 men still alive that held their positions on the last days of the siege. Ferhad Bey received reinforcements from Bosnia on 11 January.

The final assault was planned for the night of 12–13 January. Around midnight, the lights in the fort went out and the fort fell silent. Ferhad Bey thought it was a trap and the attack was postponed for the morning. The Ottomans attacked on dawn, but met no resistance. When they breached the gates of the fort, they found only corpses of soldiers that died of wounds, hunger, thirst, or were frozen to death. It is possible that the remaining defenders killed themselves on the last day to avoid imprisonment. The sight impressed Ferhad Bey so he ordered a Christian burial for the dead with military honours.

== Aftermath ==
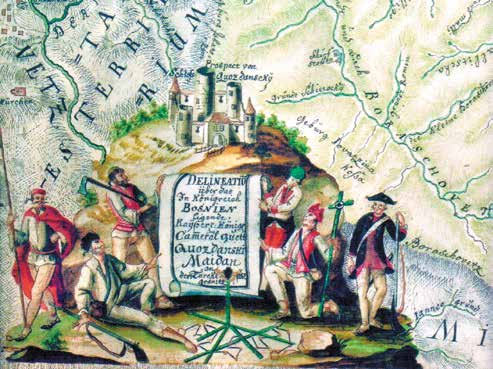
Gvozdansko on a mid-18th century geographical map

The campaign of Ferhad Bey pushed the frontier to the Kupa and Korana rivers. The loss of Gvozdansko and other strongholds, such as Ostrožac, Cazin, Bužim, and Zrin, led to many changes in the organisation of the defense. On 6 February 1578, Krsto Ungnad was confirmed as the new ban of Croatia by the Croatian Parliament. The administration of the Croatian Military Frontier was entrusted to Archduke Charles II on 25 February. Rudolf's brother, Ernest, was placed in command of the Military Frontier between the Drava River and Transylvania. Charles II was given the right to summon a War Council in Graz and appoint generals, captains, and other officers in the Frontier. The Croatian ban was subordinated to the archduke in military affairs. Inner Austrian duchies provided financial support for the Military Frontier and were given seats on the Graz War Council, which was independent of the Vienna War Council (German: Hofkriegsrat). The former civil administration of the Military Frontier was replaced with Habsburg military officials. Such an organisation further separated it from Croatian authorities.

Archduke Charles planned a counter-offensive in the Una Valley in 1578. The Croatian Parliament expressed their support for the planned operation, and at the same time stated that the subordination of the Croatian ban to a military commander would be a violation of the ban's honour and the rights of the Croatian Kingdom. Carinthian nobleman George Khevenhüller took command of the army composed of soldiers from Carniola, Carinthia, and Gorizia. Ungnad led the Croatian forces. The two armies, numbering over 12,000 soldiers and 18 canons, gathered at Slunj in August and began their initially successful campaign from there. Ferhad Bey was forced to retreat and lost control of Cazin, Ostrožac, Zrin, and Novi. Gvozdansko was also briefly recaptured, and the front line was pushed back to the Una River. The High Porte saw these defeats as a disgrace. The Ottoman forces regrouped in late September. With around 24,000 soldiers, Ferhad Bey stalled the advance of the Habsburg armies and retook the lost towns.

Following the capture of Gvozdansko, Ferhad Bey ordered the destruction of the nearby mines. A permanent Ottoman garrison was placed in the fort in December 1578. Its walls were rebuilt in 1579 and the fort was equipped with additional cannons. Gvozdansko was included into the Sanjak of Bosnia. Due to a lack of strong forts in the Kupa region, Archduke Charles decided to build a new anchor fortress at the mouth of the Korana into the Kupa. The construction of the fortress, named Karlovac after the archduke, began in July 1579, although the Croatian Parliament considered that the location of the fortress would not be of much use in the defense. Ferhad Bey did not disturb the construction of Karlovac, and focused on the repairing of Gvozdansko, Zrin, and other recently captured forts. In 1580, the sons of Nikola IV Zrinski, Juraj IV and Nikola V, led an unsuccessful attack on Gvozdansko, which was to remain under Ottoman control until 1635. The Ottomans kept most of the surrounding forts until late 17th century and the Great Turkish War.
