= 1566 in India =

- Centuries: 15th; 16th; 17th; 18th
- Decades: 1540s; 1550s; 1560s; 1570s; 1580s
- See also: List of years in India; Timeline of Indian history

Events from the year 1566 in India.

== Events ==
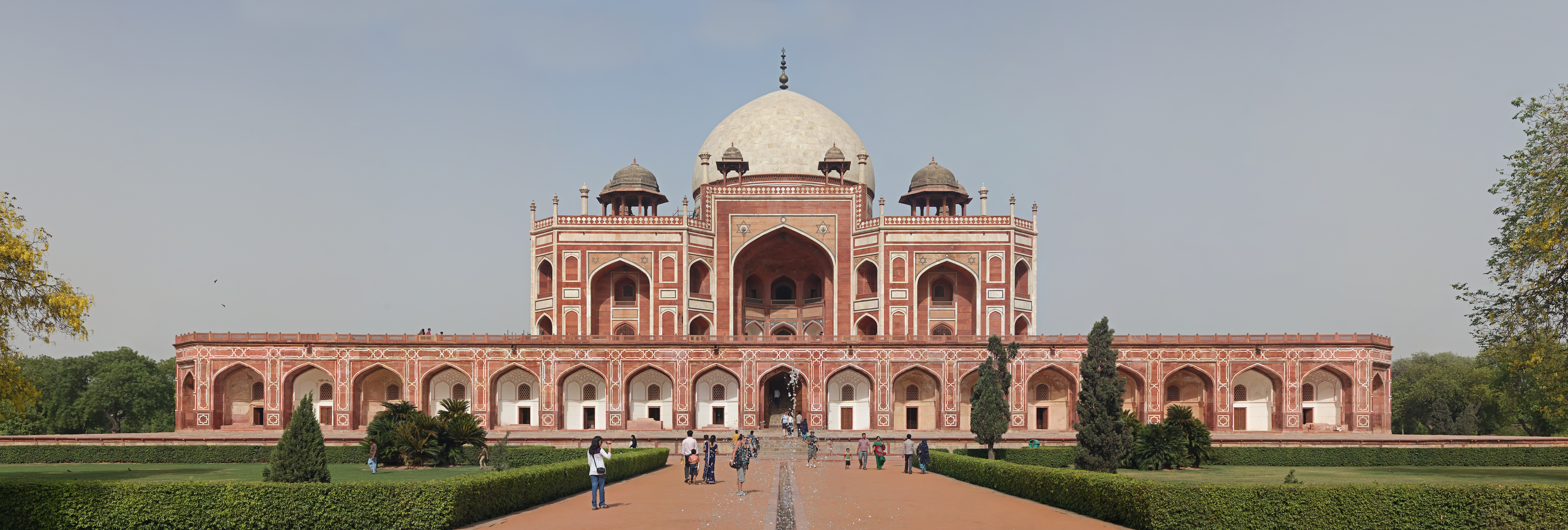
Humayun's tomb in Delhi, built 1562-1571 CE.

- The Tomb of Humayun in Delhi is completed.
- Vellore Fort, a large fort situated in Vellore Tamil Nadu, India is built
- Agra became the seat of Moghul government (until 1658).

== See also ==
- Timeline of Indian history
