= Giles de Coninck =

Flemish Jesuit theologian

Giles de Coninck (Aegidius; also called Regius) (b. 20 December 1571, at Bailleul in French Flanders; d. 31 May 1633, at Leuven) was a Flemish Jesuit theologian.

Alphonsus Liguori considered Coninck a moral theologian of distinction, though John de Lugo impugned his views on many questions.

== Life ==
At the age of 21 he entered the Society of Jesus. During his course of studies at the Catholic University of Leuven he had Lessius among his professors. He became the successor of his teacher in the chair of scholastic theology, which he held for eighteen years.

== Works ==
Coninck's principal works are:

- Commentariorum ac disputationum in universam doctrinam D. Thomæ, etc. (Antwerp, 1616; enlarged and revised 1619, 1624; Lyons 1619, 1624, 1625, 1643; Rouen, 1630. The last edition was among the Jesuit works condemned to be torn and burnt by an act of parliament of Rouen, 12 February 1762).
- De Moralitate, naturâ et effectibus actuum supernaturalium. etc. (Antwerp, 1623; Lyons, 1623; Paris, 1624. The author is said to have left very ample additions intended to appear in the subsequent editions of the work.).
- Responsio ad dissertationem impugnantem absolutionem moribundi sensibus destituti, etc. (Antwerp, 1625):
- Disputationes theolgicæ (Antwerp, 1645, published posthumously, though finished twelve years before the author's death).
