= Grzegorz IV Radziwiłł =

Polish–Lithuanian noble (1578–1613)

Grzegorz Radziwiłł
- 18th-century portrait of Grzegorz Radziwiłł

- Coat of arms: Trąby
- Born: 1578
- Died: 1613 (aged 34–35)
- Family: Radziwiłł
- Father: Mikołaj Radziwiłł

Grzegorz Radziwiłł Lithuanian: Gregoras Radvila (1578–1613), fourth Grzegorz in Radziwiłł family, was a Polish–Lithuanian noble (szlachcic), Castellan of Trakai in the Polish–Lithuanian Commonwealth.
