= Adam Contzen =

German Jesuit economist and exegete

Adam Contzen (17 April 1571, Monschau (Montjoie), Duchy of Jülich—19 June 1635, Munich) was a German Jesuit economist and exegete.

== Biography ==
Contzen was born in 1573, or, according to Carlos Sommervogel, in 1575. Friedrich Wilhelm Bautz gives the 1571 date listed above. Contzen entered the Society of Jesus at Trier in 1595. He was professor of philosophy in the University of Würzburg in 1606, and was transferred to the University of Mainz in 1610, where he occupied the chair of Holy Scripture for more than ten years. He had a share in the organization of the University of Molsheim, in Alsace, of which he was chancellor in 1622-23.

== Works ==
Contzen wrote on topics including theological controversy, political economy, and the interpretation of scriptures. He defended the controversial works of Robert Bellarmine against David Pareus of Heidelberg. When Pareus sought to unite the Calvinists and the Lutherans against the Catholics, Contzen argued that the project was impractical, in his De unione et synodo Evangelicorum.

Contzen wrote a number of works putting forward his own theory for how peace might be restored to the German nation. Two of these were:

- De Pace Germaniæ libri duo, priore de falsâ, alter de verâ (Mainz, 1616; twice reprinted in Cologne, in 1642 and in 1685)
- Jubilum Jubilorum (published in 1618 in Latin and German; occasioned by the centenary of the Reformation)

Contzen's major work, Politicorum lib. X, was published in Mainz in 1621 and 1629. The book has been called an "Anti-Machiavelli" because the author describes the ruler of a Christian commonwealth in accordance with the principals of revelation. In the questions of political and national economy which he discusses he advocates the reform of taxation, the freeing of the soil from excessive burdens, state ownership of certain industries for the purposes of revenue, indirect taxation of objects of luxury, a combination of the protective system with free trade, and state aid for popular associations. The Elector Maximilian I of Bavaria was so impressed by the ability shown in this work that he chose Contzen for his confessor.

During Contzen's residence in Munich, which began in 1623, he completed and published his commentary on the four Gospels, and on the epistles of St. Paul to the Romans, the Corinthians, and the Galatians.

Contzen also wrote a political novel, Methodus doctrinæ civilis, seu Abissini regis Historia, intended to demonstrate the practical working of his political theories.
