= Gvozdansko =

Gvozdansko Гвозданско (Serbian)
- Village
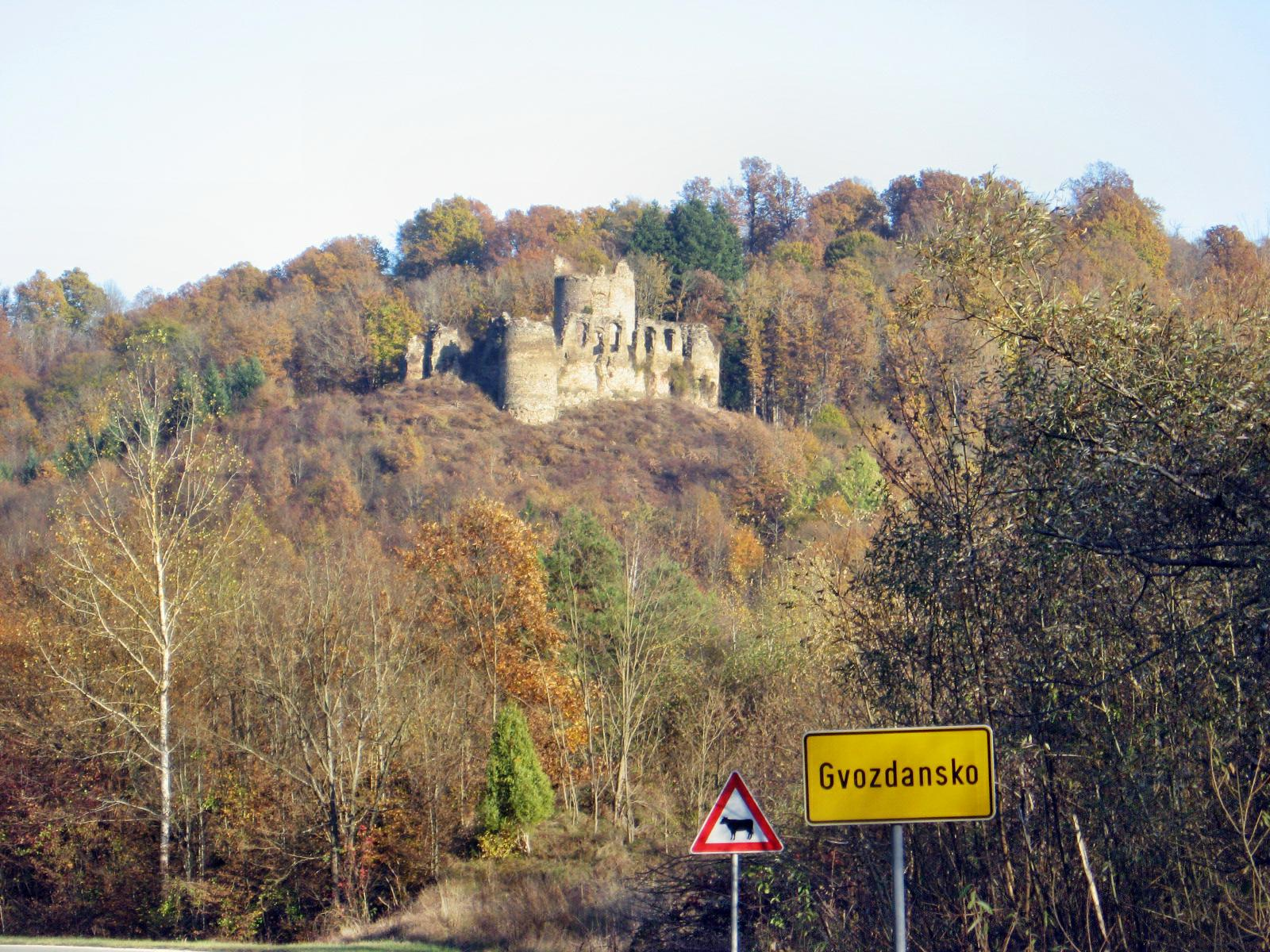
- Gvozdansko, castle ruin

- Location of Gvozdansko in Croatia
- Coordinates: 45°08′00″N 16°13′00″E
- Country: Croatia
- Region: Continental Croatia (Banovina)
- County: Sisak-Moslavina
- Municipality: Dvor

Area
  - Total: 10.7 km^{2} (4.1 sq mi)
- Elevation: 171 m (561 ft)

Population (2021)
  - Total: 23
  - Density: 2.1/km^{2} (5.6/sq mi)
- Time zone: UTC+1 (CET)
  - Summer (DST): UTC+2 (CEST)
- Postal code: 44440
- Area code: (+385) 44

Gvozdansko (Serbian Cyrillic: Гвозданско) is a village in the Sisak-Moslavina County, Croatia. It is connected by the D6 highway.

High above the village there is a ruined Gvozdansko Castle from 15th century.

== Demographics ==
According to the 2011 census, the village of Gvozdansko has 42 inhabitants. This represents 23.20% of its pre-war population according to the 1991 census.

The 1991 census recorded that 68.51% of the village population were ethnic Serbs (124/181), 22.65% were ethnic Croats (41/181), 7.74% were Yugoslavs (14/181) and 1.10% were of other ethnic origin (2/181).

Historical population 1857-2011
v

population	329	390	406	483	474	487	449	486	418	464	378	287	239	181	69	42
	1857	1869	1880	1890	1900	1910	1921	1931	1948	1953	1961	1971	1981	1991	2001	2011

Sources: Croatian Bureau of Statistics publications
