= 1571 =

1571 in various calendars
- Gregorian calendar: 1571; MDLXXI
- Ab urbe condita: 2324
- Armenian calendar: 1020; ԹՎ ՌԻ
- Assyrian calendar: 6321
- Balinese saka calendar: 1492–1493
- Bengali calendar: 977–978
- Berber calendar: 2521
- English Regnal year: 13 Eliz. 1 – 14 Eliz. 1
- Buddhist calendar: 2115
- Burmese calendar: 933
- Byzantine calendar: 7079–7080
- Chinese calendar: 庚午年 (Metal Horse); 4268 or 4061 — to — 辛未年 (Metal Goat); 4269 or 4062
- Coptic calendar: 1287–1288
- Discordian calendar: 2737
- Ethiopian calendar: 1563–1564
- Hebrew calendar: 5331–5332
- Hindu calendars
- Vikram Samvat: 1627–1628
- Shaka Samvat: 1492–1493
- Kali Yuga: 4671–4672
- Holocene calendar: 11571
- Igbo calendar: 571–572
- Iranian calendar: 949–950
- Islamic calendar: 978–979
- Japanese calendar: Genki 2 (元亀２年)
- Javanese calendar: 1490–1491
- Julian calendar: 1571; MDLXXI
- Korean calendar: 3904
- Minguo calendar: 341 before ROC 民前341年
- Nanakshahi calendar: 103
- Thai solar calendar: 2113–2114
- Tibetan calendar: ལྕགས་ཕོ་རྟ་ལོ་ (male Iron-Horse); 1697 or 1316 or 544 — to — ལྕགས་མོ་ལུག་ལོ་ (female Iron-Sheep); 1698 or 1317 or 545

October 7: Battle of Lepanto

Year 1571 (MDLXXI) was a common year starting on Monday of the Julian calendar.

== Events ==
=== January–March ===
- January 11 – The Austrian nobility are granted freedom of religion.
- January 23 – The Royal Exchange opens in London, England.
- February 4 – The Spanish Jesuit missionaries of the Ajacán Mission, established on the Virginia Peninsula of North America in 1570, are massacred by local Native Americans.
- March 18 – The Order of the Knights of Saint John transfers the capital of Malta, from Birgu to Valletta.

=== April–June ===
- April 2
  - The 3rd Parliament of Elizabeth I, with 438 members, assembles in England at Westminster after being summoned on February 17.
  - Dumbarton Castle is recaptured from Lord Fleming by the forces of Matthew Stewart, 4th Earl of Lennox, the Regent for King James VI of Scotland.
- April 12 – The Ridolfi plot to assassinate Queen Elizabeth I of England is foiled by the capture of Ridolfi's messenger, Charles Baillie.
- April 17 – Pope John XIV of Alexandria begins a 15-year reign as leader of the Coptic Christian Church.
- April 21
  - In China, General Altan Khan is granted authority to rule the western provinces by the Ming dynasty Emperor Longqing in return for his payment of a tribute.
  - In the German Duchy of Palatinate-Zweibrücken, the serfs are emancipated by John, Count of Palatine and Duke of Zweibrucken.
- May 24 – Moscow is burnt by the Crimean army, under Devlet I Giray.
- May 25 – The Holy League is established as an alliance of the Papal States, the Republic of Venice, the Republic of Genoa, the Grand Duchy of Tuscany, the Duchy of Savoy, the Duchy of Urbino, the Kingdom of Naples and Kingdom of Sicily under the rule of the Spanish Empire and the Knights of Malta for mutual defense against attacks by the Ottoman Empire on ships in the Mediterranean Sea.
- May 29 – Queen Elizabeth I of England gives royal assent to laws that had been passed by the 3rd Parliament, including the Bulls from Rome Act 1571 to prevent the publication in England of papal bulls as well as "writings or instruments and other superstitious things from the See of Rome"
- June 3 – Following the Battle of Bangkusay Channel, the conquest of the Kingdom of Maynila is complete; Spanish Conquistador Miguel López de Legazpi makes Manila a city, and the capital of the Philippines.
- June 24 – On the island of Luzon in the Philippines, Miguel López de Legazpi of Spain establishes a Spanish fortress at Manila Bay and, after making a peace pact with the Crown Prince of Luzon, Rajah Sulayman declares Manila to be the administrative capital of the Spanish East Indies.
- June 25 – Queen Elizabeth's Grammar School, Horncastle, is founded in Lincolnshire, England.
- June 27 – Jesus College is established "within the City and University of Oxford of Queen Elizabeth's foundation" in England, by Welsh cleric and lawyer Hugh Price.

=== July–September ===
- July 14 – In what is now the state of Kerala in India, the Siege of Chaliyam begins as the Zamorin of Kozhikode, Mana Vikrama, sends troops to starve out the Portuguese Empire's Chale fortress. The Portuguese defender, Dom Jorge de Castro, is allowed to surrender the fort in November and the Portuguese are allowed to march out of the fort. De Castro is executed by the Portuguese Governor-General after returning to Portuguese controlled Goa.
- July 25 – St Olave's Grammar School is founded in Tooley Street, London.
- August 1 – The Ottoman conquest of Cyprus is concluded, by the surrender of Famagusta. Cyprus is established as an eyalet of the Ottoman Empire, and the first Turkish colony moves into the island.
- August 29 – Liliw, Laguna, Philippines is founded by Gat Tayaw, followers and residents as a municipality of Laguna.
- September 5 – John Erskine, Earl of Mar is selected by the Scottish royal family to be the new Regent of Scotland to rule on behalf of the 5-year-old King James VI. The Earl of Mar replaces Matthew Stewart, 4th Earl of Lennox, the King's grandfather, who was assassinated the day before by supporters of his daughter-in-law the imprisoned Mary, Queen of Scots.
- September 28 – The House of Commons of England introduces the first pro forma bill, symbolizing its authority over its own affairs.
- September 30 (12th day of 9th month of Genki) – In Japan, the Siege of Mount Hiei is carried out by Oda Nobunaga at Ōmi Province (now the Shiga Prefecture). After Nobunaga's 30,000 troops overwhelm the monks of the 4,000 warriors of the Sōhei, Nobunaga orders the massacre of more than 1,500 survivors.

=== October–December ===
- October 7 – Battle of Lepanto: Spanish, Venetian, and Papal naval forces, under Don John of Austria, defeat the Ottoman fleet of Müezzinzade Ali Pasha.
- November 4 – The Mexican Inquisition, for investigation and punishment of heresy against the Roman Catholic Church in the New World, begins with the first session of the Tribunal of the Holy Office of the Inquisition in New Spain.
- November 16 – Michele Bonelli is sent as the legate a latere by Pope Pius V to work directly with King Charles IX of France. From June 18 until his new assignment, Bonelli had been the legate to the King of Spain and the King of Portugal.
- November 20 – Clan Gordon defeats Clan Forbes in the Battle of Craibstone, fought near Aberdeen in Scotland. Clan Forbes sustains 300 deaths and 200 men are taken prisoner out of its original contingent of 900, while Clan Gordon suffers 200 deaths of its 800 men.
- December 24 – Henry XI, Duke of the German Duchy of Liegnitz (now part of Poland), who had increased the Duchy's debts from 80,000 thalers to 700,000 thalers over 11 years, attempts to get the representatives of the Congress of Estates to pledge their own goods and valuables as collateral for refinancing the debt. When the representatives of the different parts of the Duchy refuse, he has them jailed until they agree to pay taxes for 10 percent of the debt owed.

=== Date unknown ===
- Using mercury in the silver extraction process dramatically increases the output of the Potosí mine; thus begins the great silver flow that links the New and Old Worlds.
- The Swedish Church Ordinance 1571 creates the first complete order of the Protestant Swedish church. The church ordinance also includes a chapter about schooling, in which all children in the cities, regardless of sex, are to be given elementary schooling.
- Taipalsaari is founded.

== Births ==
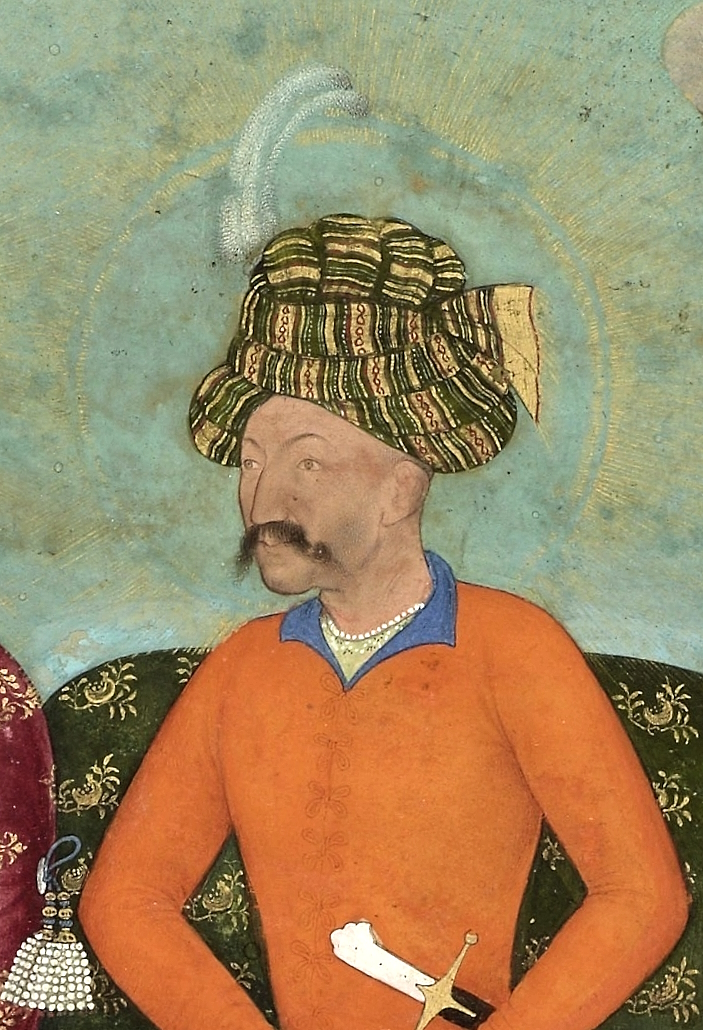
Abbas the Great

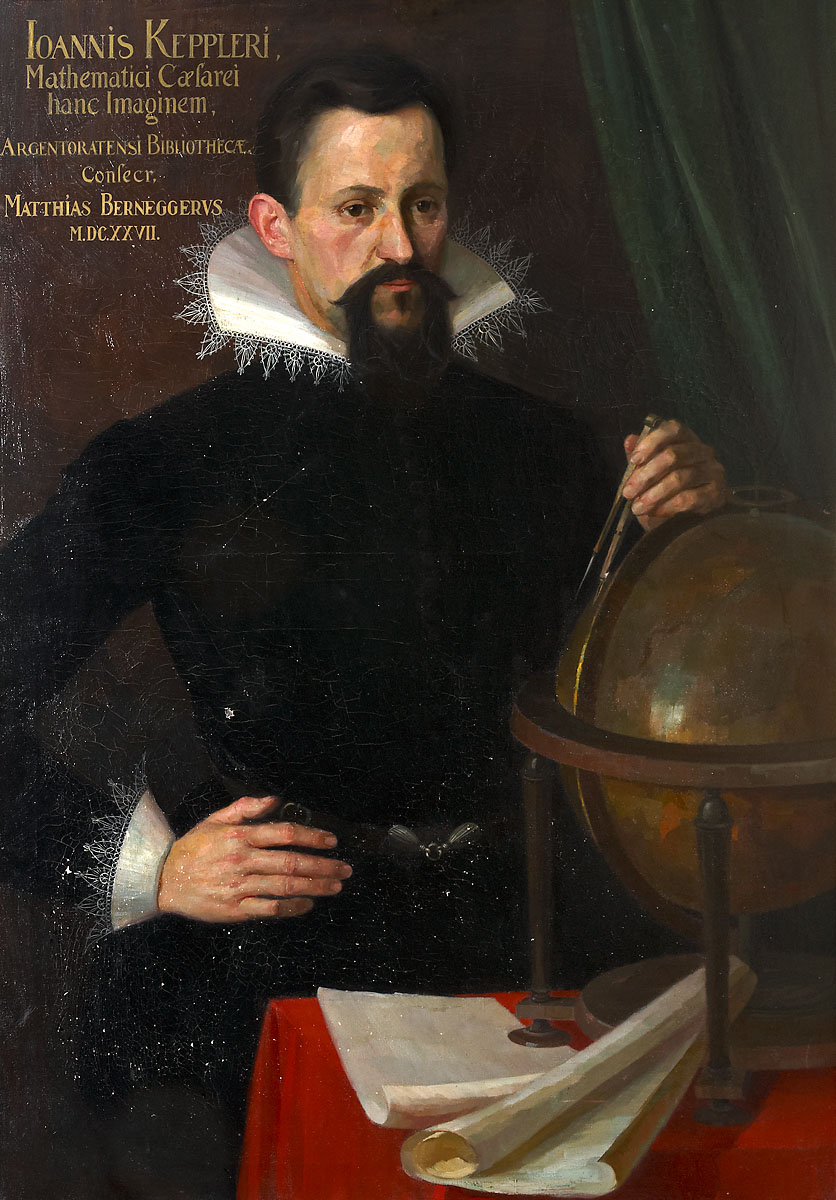
Johannes Kepler

- January 9 – Charles Bonaventure de Longueval, Count of Bucquoy, French soldier in Habsburg service (d. 1621)
- January 27 – Abbas the Great, Shah of Iran (d. 1629)
- February 15 – Michael Praetorius, German composer and writer on music (d. 1621)
- March 31 – Pietro Aldobrandini, Italian cardinal, archbishop (d. 1621)
- April 17 – Adam Contzen, German economist (d. 1635)
- April 22 – Giovanni Branca, Italian architect and engineer (d. 1645)
- April 24 – Sur Singh, Ruler of Marwar (d. 1619)
- May 11 – Niwa Nagashige, Japanese warlord (d. 1637)
- June 17 – Thomas Mun, English writer on economics (d. 1641)
- July 16 – Theodoor Galle, Flemish engraver (d. 1633)
- August 2 – Charles, Duke of Guise, son of Henry I (d. 1640)
- August 14 – Anders Bure, founder of Swedish cartography (d. 1646)
- September 12 – Álvaro de Bazán, 2nd Marquis of Santa Cruz (d. 1646)
- September 21 – Giovanni Battista Magnani, Italian architect (d. 1653)
- September 29 – Caravaggio, Venetian artist (d. 1610)
- October 7
  - Anton Henry, Count of Schwarzburg-Sondershausen from 1586 (d. 1638)
  - Maria, Abbess of Quedlinburg, German abbess (d. 1610)
- October 15 – Jacob Matham, Dutch artist (d. 1631)
- October 18 – Wolfgang Ratke, German educational reformer (d. 1635)
- November 18 – Hippolytus Guarinonius, Italian physician and polymath (d. 1654)
- December 3 – Lakshmi Kumara Thathachariar, Indian saint (d. 1643)
- December 4 – Ferdinand, Prince of Asturias, Spanish prince (d. 1578)
- December 9 – Metius, Dutch mathematician and astronomer (d. 1635)
- December 20
  - Giles de Coninck, Flemish Jesuit theologian (d. 1633)
  - Scévole de Sainte-Marthe, French historian (d. 1650)
- December 27 – Johannes Kepler, German astronomer (d. 1630)
- December 31 – Emperor Go-Yōzei of Japan (d. 1617)
- date unknown
  - Henry Ainsworth, English Nonconformist clergyman and scholar (d. 1622)
  - William Bedell, Anglican churchman (d. 1642)
  - Willem Blaeu, Dutch cartographer (d. 1638)
  - Charles Butler, English beekeeper and philologist (d. 1647)
  - Inés de Hinojosa, Venezuelan hacendada (b. 1540)
  - Frederick de Houtman, Dutch explorer (d. 1627)
  - Esther Inglis, French (?British-born) calligrapher (d. 1624)
  - Lucrezia Marinella, Italian poet and author (d. 1653)
  - Paulus Moreelse, Dutch painter (d. 1638)
  - Hugh Roe O'Donnell, Irish chieftain and rebel (d. 1603)
  - Aleksander Ostrogski, Polish nobleman (d. 1603)
  - Alessandro Peretti di Montalto, Venetian cardinal (d. 1623)
  - Thomas Storer, English poet (d. 1604)
  - Thomas Wintour, English Gunpowder Plot conspirator (d. 1606)

== Deaths ==
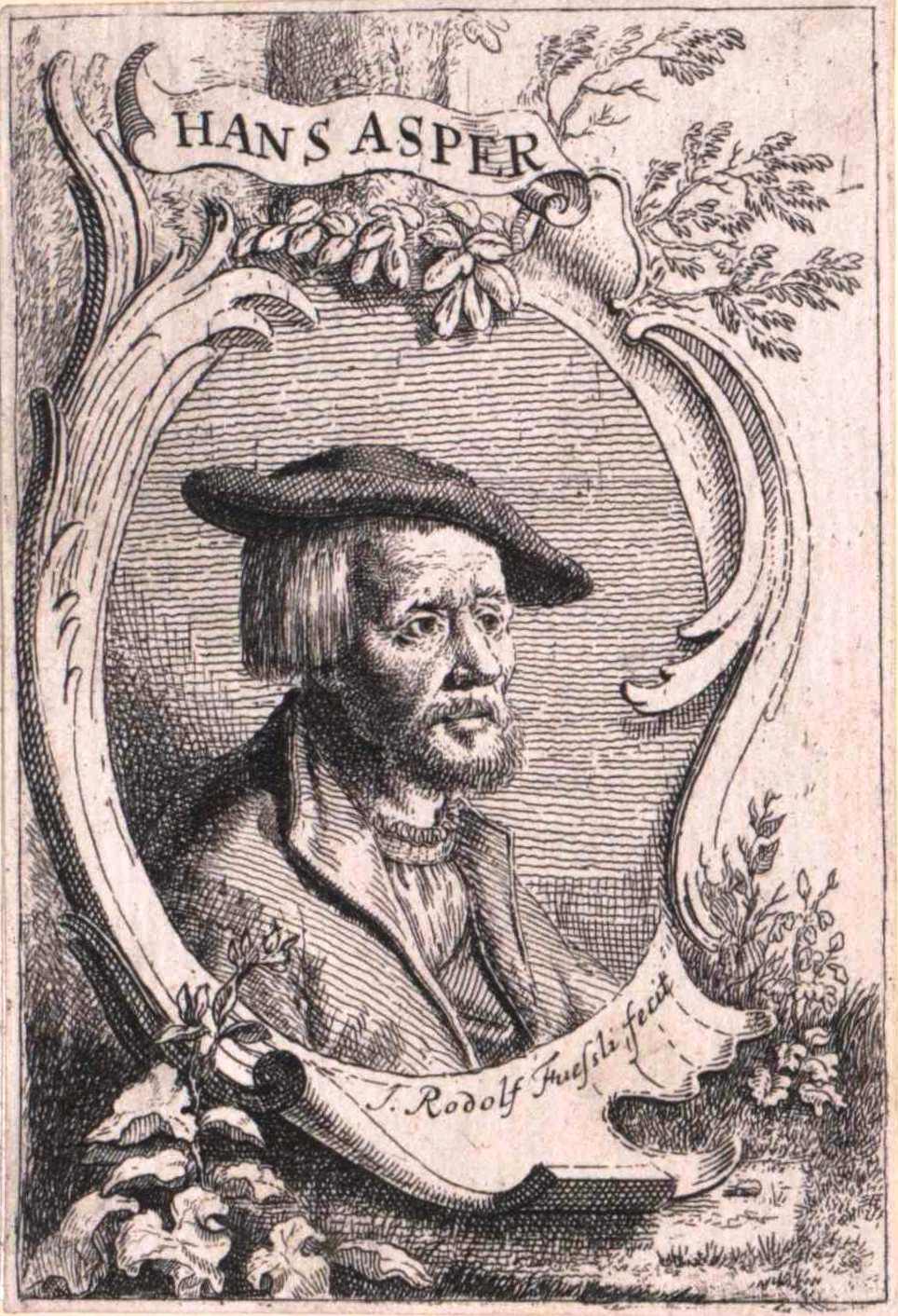
Hans Asper

- January 3
  - Joachim II Hector, Elector of Brandenburg (b. 1505)
  - Yi Hwang, Korean Neo-Confucian scholar, (b.1502)
- January 9 – Nicolas Durand de Villegaignon, French naval officer (b. 1510)
- January 13 – John, Margrave of Brandenburg-Küstrin (b. 1513)
- January 19 – Paris Bordone, Venetian painter (b. 1495)
- February 12 – Nicholas Throckmorton, English diplomat and politician (b. 1515)
- February 13 – Benvenuto Cellini, Italian artist (b. 1500)
- March 6 – Tsukahara Bokuden, Japanese swordsman (b. 1489)
- March 14 – John Sigismund Zápolya, King of Hungary (b. 1540)
- March 21
  - Odet de Coligny, French cardinal and Protestant (b. 1517)
  - Hans Asper, Swiss painter (b. 1499)
- April 6 – John Hamilton, Scottish prelate and politician (b. 1511)
- May 4 – Pierre Viret, Swiss theologian (b. 1511)
- May 29 – Joachim Mörlin, German Lutheran bishop (b. 1514)
- June 1 – John Story, English Catholic (martyred) (b. 1504)
- June 3 – Tarik Sulayman, Filipino chieftain
- June 7 – Francesco Corteccia, Italian composer (b. 1502)
- July 6 – Mōri Motonari, Japanese warlord (b. 1497)
- July 15 – Shimazu Takahisa, Japanese samurai and warlord (b. 1514)
- July 17 – Georg Fabricius, German poet (b. 1516)
- August 17 – Marco Antonio Bragadin, Venetian lawyer and military officer (b. 1523)
- September 4 – Matthew Stewart, 4th Earl of Lennox (b. 1516)
- September 23 – John Jewel, English Anglican bishop (b. 1522)
- October 7
  - Dorothea of Saxe-Lauenburg, Danish queen, consort of Christian III of Denmark (b. 1511)
  - Müezzinzade Ali Pasha, Ottoman statesmen and naval officer
- November 24 – Jan Blahoslav, Czech writer (b. 1523)
- December 14 – Lorenzo Strozzi, Italian Catholic cardinal (b. 1513)
- date unknown
  - Titu Cusi, Incan ruler (b. 1529)
  - Anna Vigfúsdóttir á Stóru-Borg, Icelandic landowner
  - Setthathirath, Laotian king of Lan Na and Lan Xang (b. 1534)
