= 1565 =

1565 in various calendars
- Gregorian calendar: 1565; MDLXV
- Ab urbe condita: 2318
- Armenian calendar: 1014; ԹՎ ՌԺԴ
- Assyrian calendar: 6315
- Balinese saka calendar: 1486–1487
- Bengali calendar: 971–972
- Berber calendar: 2515
- English Regnal year: 7 Eliz. 1 – 8 Eliz. 1
- Buddhist calendar: 2109
- Burmese calendar: 927
- Byzantine calendar: 7073–7074
- Chinese calendar: 甲子年 (Wood Rat); 4262 or 4055 — to — 乙丑年 (Wood Ox); 4263 or 4056
- Coptic calendar: 1281–1282
- Discordian calendar: 2731
- Ethiopian calendar: 1557–1558
- Hebrew calendar: 5325–5326
- Hindu calendars
- Vikram Samvat: 1621–1622
- Shaka Samvat: 1486–1487
- Kali Yuga: 4665–4666
- Holocene calendar: 11565
- Igbo calendar: 565–566
- Iranian calendar: 943–944
- Islamic calendar: 972–973
- Japanese calendar: Eiroku 8 (永禄８年)
- Javanese calendar: 1484–1485
- Julian calendar: 1565; MDLXV
- Korean calendar: 3898
- Minguo calendar: 347 before ROC 民前347年
- Nanakshahi calendar: 97
- Thai solar calendar: 2107–2108
- Tibetan calendar: ཤིང་ཕོ་བྱི་བ་ལོ་ (male Wood-Rat); 1691 or 1310 or 538 — to — ཤིང་མོ་གླང་ལོ་ (female Wood-Ox); 1692 or 1311 or 539

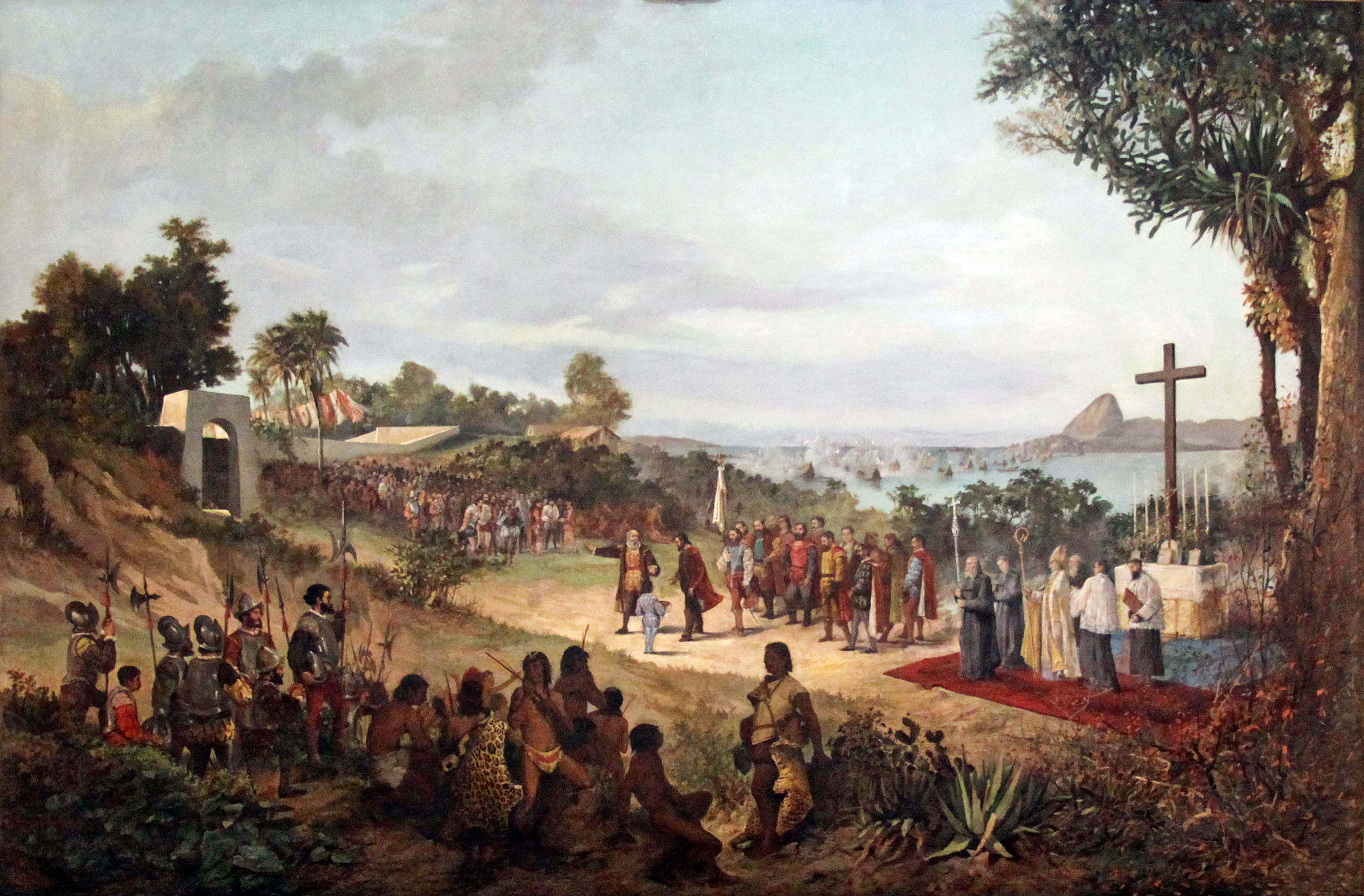
March 1: Rio de Janeiro is founded.

Year 1565 (MDLXV) was a common year starting on Monday of the Julian calendar.

== Events ==
=== January–March ===
- January 3 – In the Tsardom of Russia, Ivan the Terrible originates the oprichnina (repression of the boyars (aristocrats)).
- January 23 – Battle of Talikota: The Vijayanagara Empire, the last Hindu kingdom in South India, is greatly weakened by the Deccan sultanates.
- February 13 – Spanish Conquistador Miguel López de Legazpi lands with his troops on the shores of Cebu Island in the Philippines.
- March 1 – The city of Rio de Janeiro, Brazil, is founded as São Sebastião do Rio de Janeiro by Estácio de Sá.
- March 16 – Spanish Conquistador López de Legazpi makes a blood compact (sandugan) with Datu Sikatuna in the island of Bohol, Philippines.

=== April–June ===
- April 27 – Cebu City is established as San Miguel by López de Legazpi, becoming the first Spanish settlement in the Philippines.
- May 2 – Huntingdon Grammar School is established in England.
- May 18 – Ottoman troops land on the island of Malta, beginning the Great Siege of Malta.
- June 4 – The Treaty of Cebu is signed between Miguel López de Legazpi, representing Philip II of Spain, and Rajah Tupas of Cebu. This effectively creates Spanish suzerainty over Cebu.
- June 17 – (19th day of 5th month, Eiroku 8); In Japan, Ashikaga Yoshiteru, the Ashikaga shogun, commits ritual suicide after Matsunaga Hisahide invades Kyoto.

=== July–September ===
- July 29 – The widowed Mary, Queen of Scots, marries her half-cousin Henry Stuart, Lord Darnley, at Holyrood Palace in Edinburgh, in a Catholic ceremony.
- August 6 – Sark, in the Channel Islands, is granted as a fief by Elizabeth I of England to Hellier de Carteret, Seigneur of Saint Ouen.
- August 26 – The Chaseabout Raid begins in Scotland as a rebellion against Mary, Queen of Scots by her half-brother, by James Stewart, 1st Earl of Moray, following her July 29 marriage to Lord Darnley.
- August 28 (feast day of St. Augustine) – The Spanish fleet of Pedro Menéndez de Avilés first sights land in Florida.
- August 31 – Chaseabout Raid: Moray and at least 1,000 of his rebels arrive in Edinburgh for a confrontation with the Scottish crown. After cannon fire from Edinburgh Castle, the rebels retreat toward England to seek help. The rebellion is ended by the end of September.
- September 4 – The Spanish fleet of Pedro Menéndez de Avilés lands in Florida to oust the French under Jean Ribault. He later destroys the French colony of Fort Caroline.
- September 8 – St. Augustine, Florida (named after Augustine of Hippo), is established by Pedro Menéndez de Avilés, becoming the oldest surviving European settlement in the modern-day United States, and a mass of Thanksgiving is said.
- September 11 – The Knights of Malta lift the Great Siege of Malta after four months.

=== October–December ===
- October 11 – Ottavio Gentile Oderico is elected to a two-year term as the Doge of the Republic of Genoa.
- October 18 – Battle of Fukuda Bay: Ships belonging to the Matsura clan of Japan fail to capture a Portuguese trading carrack, in the first recorded naval battle between Japan and a European nation.
- October 20 – In the Northern Seven Years' War, the Battle of Axtorna is fought in Sweden, near Falkenberg, as Daniel Rantzau of the Army of Denmark and Norway leads 7,400 troops in defeating a counterattack by over 11,000 Swedish troops led by Jacob Henriksson Hästesko.
- October – The first Martello tower, the Tour de Mortella, designed by Giovan Giacomo Paleari Fratino (el Fratin), is completed as part of the Genovese defence system at Mortella (Myrtle) Point, in Upper Corsica.
- November 25 – The army of Burma, under the command of King Bayinnaung conquers Chiang Mai, capital of the Siamese Kingdom of Lan Na, and departs on November 30.
- December 31 – The Burmese Army conquers Vientiane, the main city of the kingdom of Lan Xang (now Laos).
- December – The Mariovo and Prilep rebellion occurs, the very first recorded rebellion by the Macedonian hajduks or voivode against the Ottoman Empire.

=== Date unknown ===
- The pencil is first documented by Conrad Gesner; it is becoming common in England.
- John Beddoes School is founded at Presteigne, Wales.
- Herlufsholm School is founded at Næstved, Denmark.
- Bungay Grammar School is established in England.

== Births ==
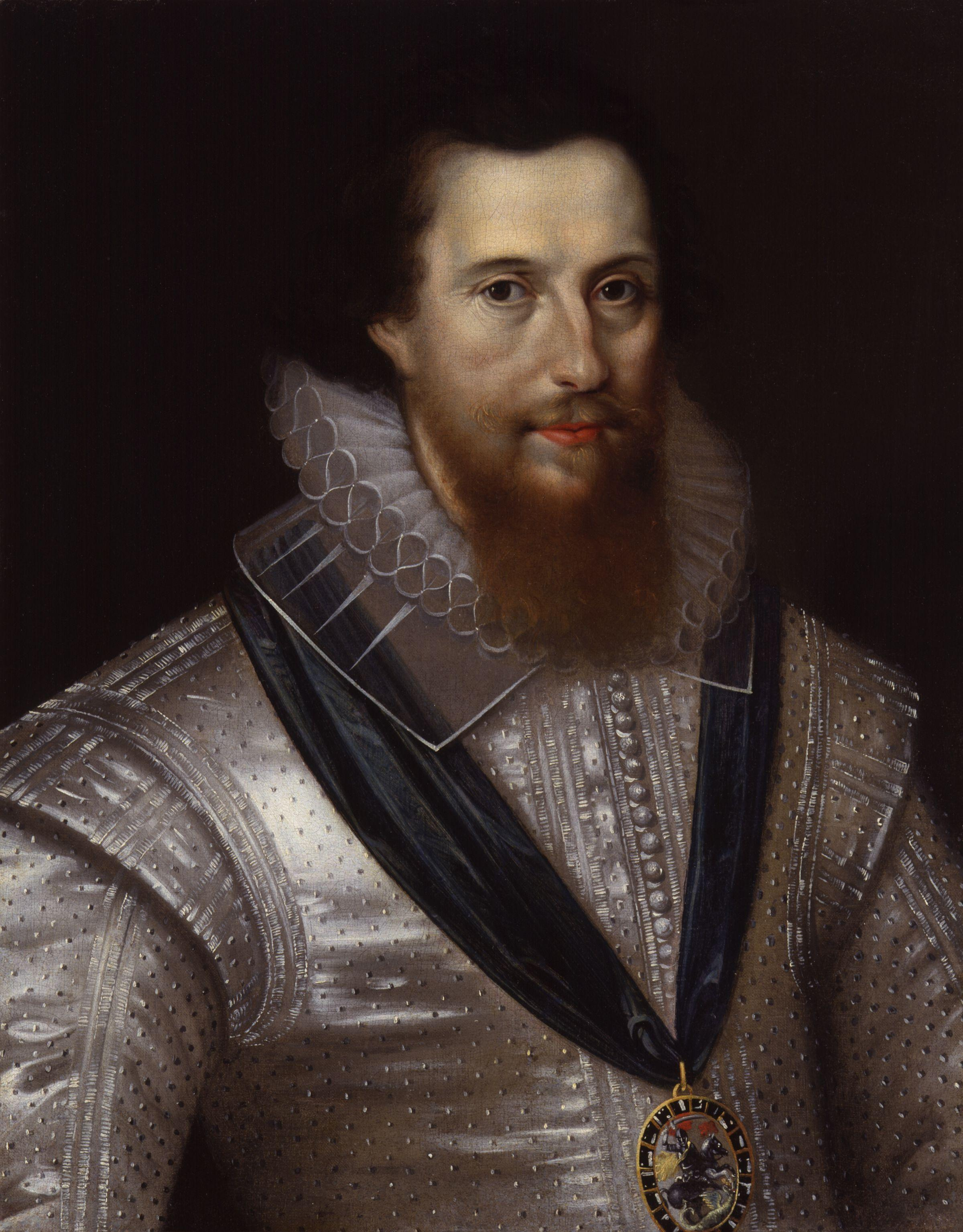
Robert Devereux, 2nd Earl of Essex

- January 17 – Mariana Navarro de Guevarra Romero, Spanish Roman Catholic nun, member of the Mercedarian Tertiaries (d. 1624)
- February 13 – Willem Baudartius, Dutch theologian (d. 1640)
- March 23 – Eilhard Lubinus, German theologian (d. 1621)
- April 2 – Cornelis de Houtman, Dutch explorer (d. 1599)
- April 3 – Anna III, Abbess of Quedlinburg (d. 1601)
- May 15 – Hendrick de Keyser, Dutch sculptor and architect born in Utrecht (d. 1621)
- June 2 – Francisco Ribalta, Spanish painter (d. 1628)
- June 14 – Francis Tanfield, English governor of the South Falkland colony
- July 6 – Hugh Hamersley, Lord Mayor of London, 1627–1628 (d. 1636)
- August 5 – Paola Massarenghi, Italian composer (d. unknown)
- August 9 – Louis II, Count of Nassau-Weilburg (d. 1627)
- August 16 – Christina, Grand Duchess of Tuscany (d. 1637)
- August 20 – Margaretha van Valckenburch, Dutch shipowner, only female member of the VOC (d. 1650)
- August 29 – Agostino Ciampelli, Italian painter (d. 1630)
- September 17 – Edward Fortunatus, German nobleman (d. 1600)
- September 28 – Alessandro Tassoni, Italian poet and writer (d. 1635)
- October 6 – Marie de Gournay, French writer (d. 1645)
- October 12 – Ippolito Galantini, Italian founder of the Congregation of Christian Doctrine of Florence (d. 1619)
- October 22 – Benedikt Carpzov the elder, German legal scholar (d. 1624)
- November 10
  - Robert Devereux, 2nd Earl of Essex, English nobleman and politician (d. 1601)
  - Laurentius Paulinus Gothus, Swedish theologian and astronomer (d. 1646)
- November 14 – Petrus Bertius, Flemish theologian and scientist (d. 1629)
- December 2 – Toby Caulfeild, 1st Baron Caulfeild, Northern Irish politician (d. 1627)
- date unknown
  - Reza Abbasi, Persian painter and calligrapher (d. 1635)
  - Gregor Aichinger, German composer (d. 1628)
  - John Davies of Hereford, Welsh poet (d. 1618)
  - Camillo Graffico, Italian engraver (d. 1615)
  - George Kirbye, English composer (d. 1634)
  - Francis Meres, English churchman and author (d. 1647)
  - María Pita, Spanish heroine (d. 1643)
  - John Spottiswoode, Archbishop of St. Andrews (d. 1639)
  - Edmund Whitelocke, English soldier and courtier (d. 1608)
- probable
  - Duarte Lobo, Portuguese composer (d. 1646)

== Deaths ==
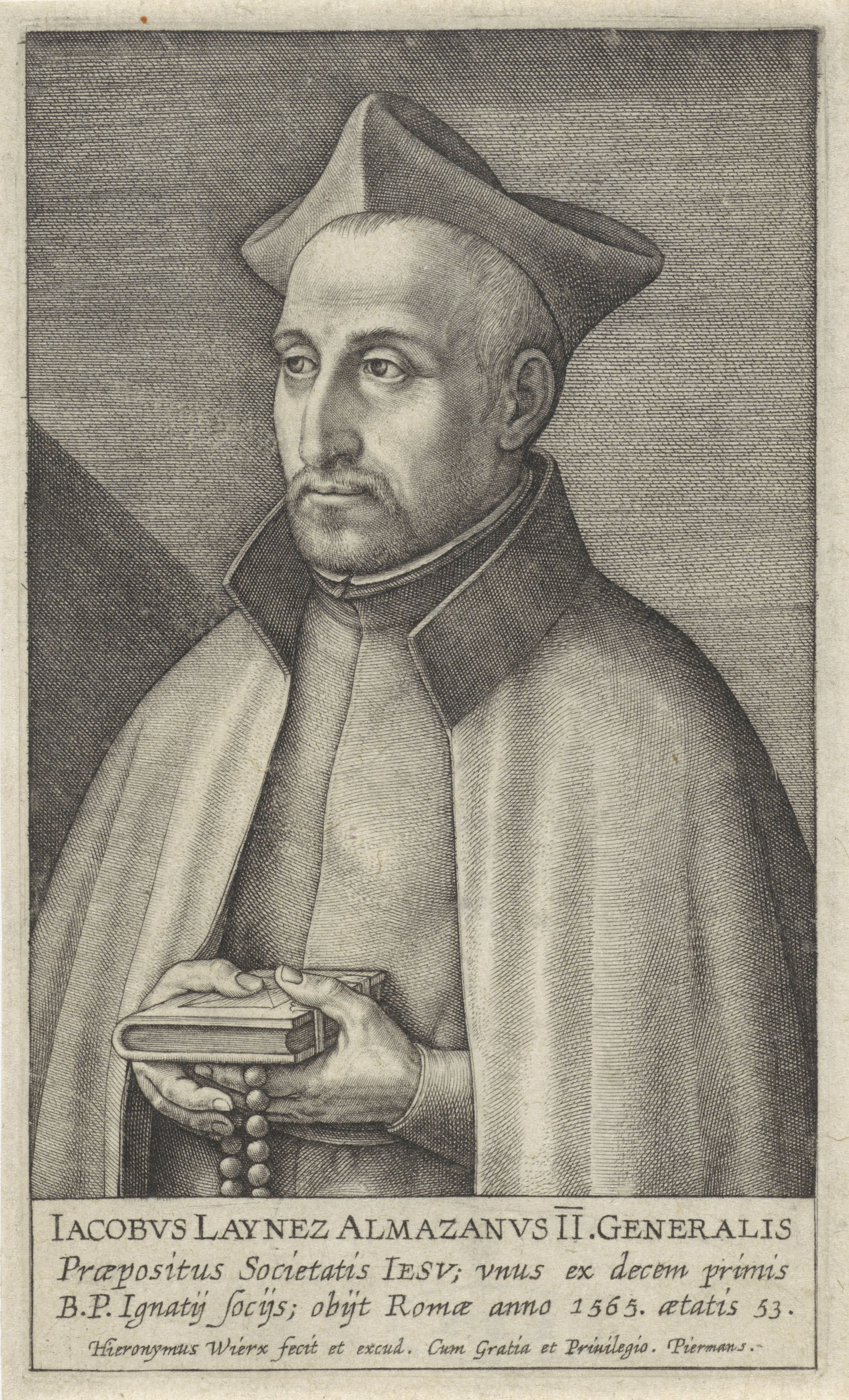
Diego Laynez

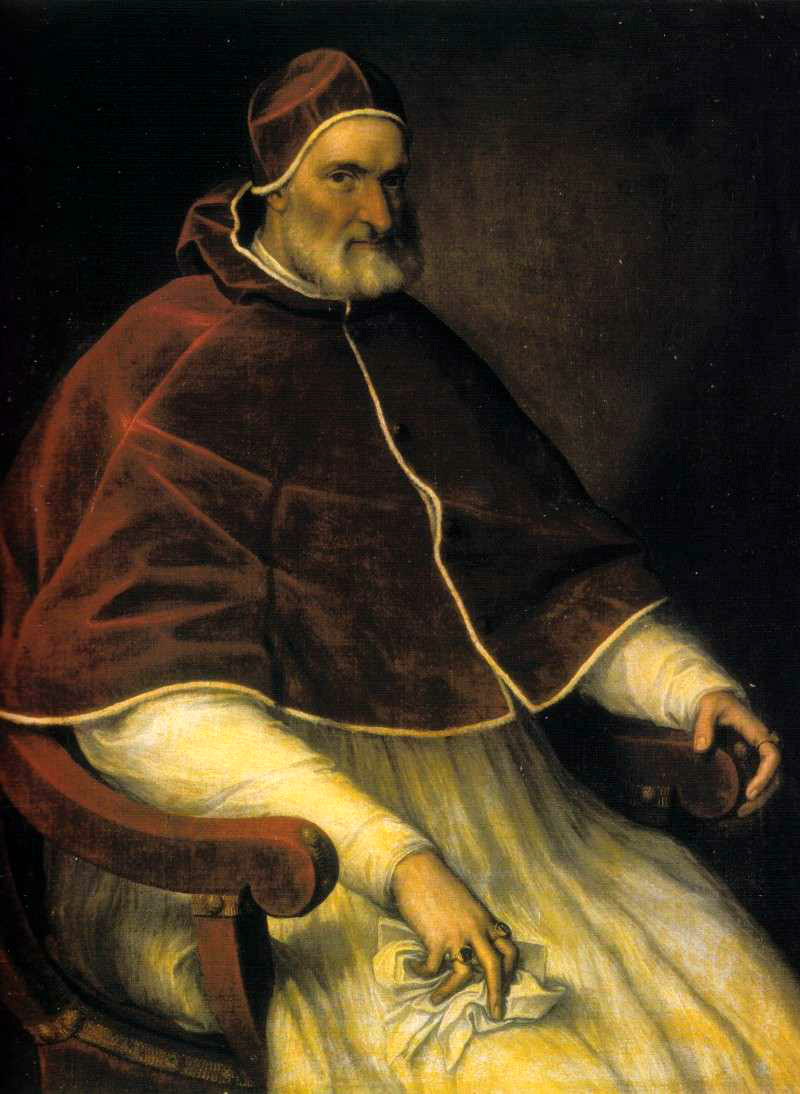
Pope Pius IV

- January 19 – Diego Laynez, Spanish Jesuit theologian (b. 1512)
- January 28 – Francisco Cesi, Italian Catholic cardinal (b. 1500)
- February 28 – John, Duke of Münsterberg-Oels and Count of Glatz (b. 1509)
- March 17 – Alexander Ales, Scottish theologian (b. 1500)
- c. March – Lope de Rueda, Spanish dramatist (b. c. 1510)
- April 2 – Elisabeth Parr, Marchioness of Northampton, English noble (b. 1526)
- April 27 – Osanna of Cattaro, Dominican visionary and anchoress (b. 1493)
- May 14 – Nicolaus von Amsdorf, German Protestant reformer (b. 1483)
- May 5 – Queen Munjeong, Korean queen (b. 1501)
- May 28 – Mikołaj "the Black" Radziwiłł, Polish magnate (b. 1515)
- June 12 – Adrianus Turnebus, French classical scholar (b. 1512)
- June 17 – Ashikaga Yoshiteru, Japanese shogun (b. 1536)
- June 19 – Wolfgang Lazius, Austrian historian (b. 1514)
- June 23 – Turgut Reis, Ottoman naval commander (b. 1485)
- July 18 – Kat Ashley, governess of Elizabeth I of England
- August – Jacques Buus, Flemish composer and organist (b. 1500)
- August 29 – Alfonso Carafa, Italian cardinal (b. 1540)
- June 25 – Herluf Trolle, Danish Admiral of the Fleet and co-founder of Herlufsholm School (b. 1516)
- September 13 – William Farel, French evangelist (b. 1489)
- September 11–20 – Cipriano de Rore, Flemish composer and teacher (b. 1515)
- October 4 – Pier Paolo Vergerio, Italian reformer (b. 1498)
- October 5 – Lodovico Ferrari, Italian mathematician (b. 1522)
- October 7 – Johannes Mathesius, German theologian (b. 1504)
- October 12 – Jean Ribault, French explorer and colonizer (b. 1520)
- October 14 – Thomas Chaloner, English statesman and poet (b. 1521)
- October 21 – John Frederick III, Duke of Saxony and nominal Duke of Saxe-Gotha (b. 1538)
- October 22 – Jean, Vicomte d'Aguisy Grolier de Servieres, French bibliophile (b. 1479)
- October 29 – Ranuccio Farnese, Italian prelate (b. 1530)
- November 2 – Mechthild of Bavaria, German duchess (b. 1532)
- November 25 – Hu Zongxian, Chinese general (b. 1512)
- December 9 – Pope Pius IV (b. 1499)
- December 12 – Johan Rantzau, German general (b. 1492)
- December 13 – Conrad Gessner, Swiss naturalist (b. 1516)
- date unknown
  - Antonio Bernieri, Italian painter of the Renaissance period (b. 1516)
  - Yadegar Mokhammad of Kazan, last khan of Kazan Khanate
  - Paweł Tarło, canon of Kraków, Poland
