= 1624 =

1624 in various calendars
- Gregorian calendar: 1624; MDCXXIV
- Ab urbe condita: 2377
- Armenian calendar: 1073; ԹՎ ՌՀԳ
- Assyrian calendar: 6374
- Balinese saka calendar: 1545–1546
- Bengali calendar: 1030–1031
- Berber calendar: 2574
- English Regnal year: 21 Ja. 1 – 22 Ja. 1
- Buddhist calendar: 2168
- Burmese calendar: 986
- Byzantine calendar: 7132–7133
- Chinese calendar: 癸亥年 (Water Pig); 4321 or 4114 — to — 甲子年 (Wood Rat); 4322 or 4115
- Coptic calendar: 1340–1341
- Discordian calendar: 2790
- Ethiopian calendar: 1616–1617
- Hebrew calendar: 5384–5385
- Hindu calendars
- Vikram Samvat: 1680–1681
- Shaka Samvat: 1545–1546
- Kali Yuga: 4724–4725
- Holocene calendar: 11624
- Igbo calendar: 624–625
- Iranian calendar: 1002–1003
- Islamic calendar: 1033–1034
- Japanese calendar: Genna 10 / Kan'ei 1 (寛永元年)
- Javanese calendar: 1545–1546
- Julian calendar: Gregorian minus 10 days
- Korean calendar: 3957
- Minguo calendar: 288 before ROC 民前288年
- Nanakshahi calendar: 156
- Thai solar calendar: 2166–2167
- Tibetan calendar: ཆུ་མོ་ཕག་ལོ་ (female Water-Boar); 1750 or 1369 or 597 — to — ཤིང་ཕོ་བྱི་བ་ལོ་ (male Wood-Rat); 1751 or 1370 or 598

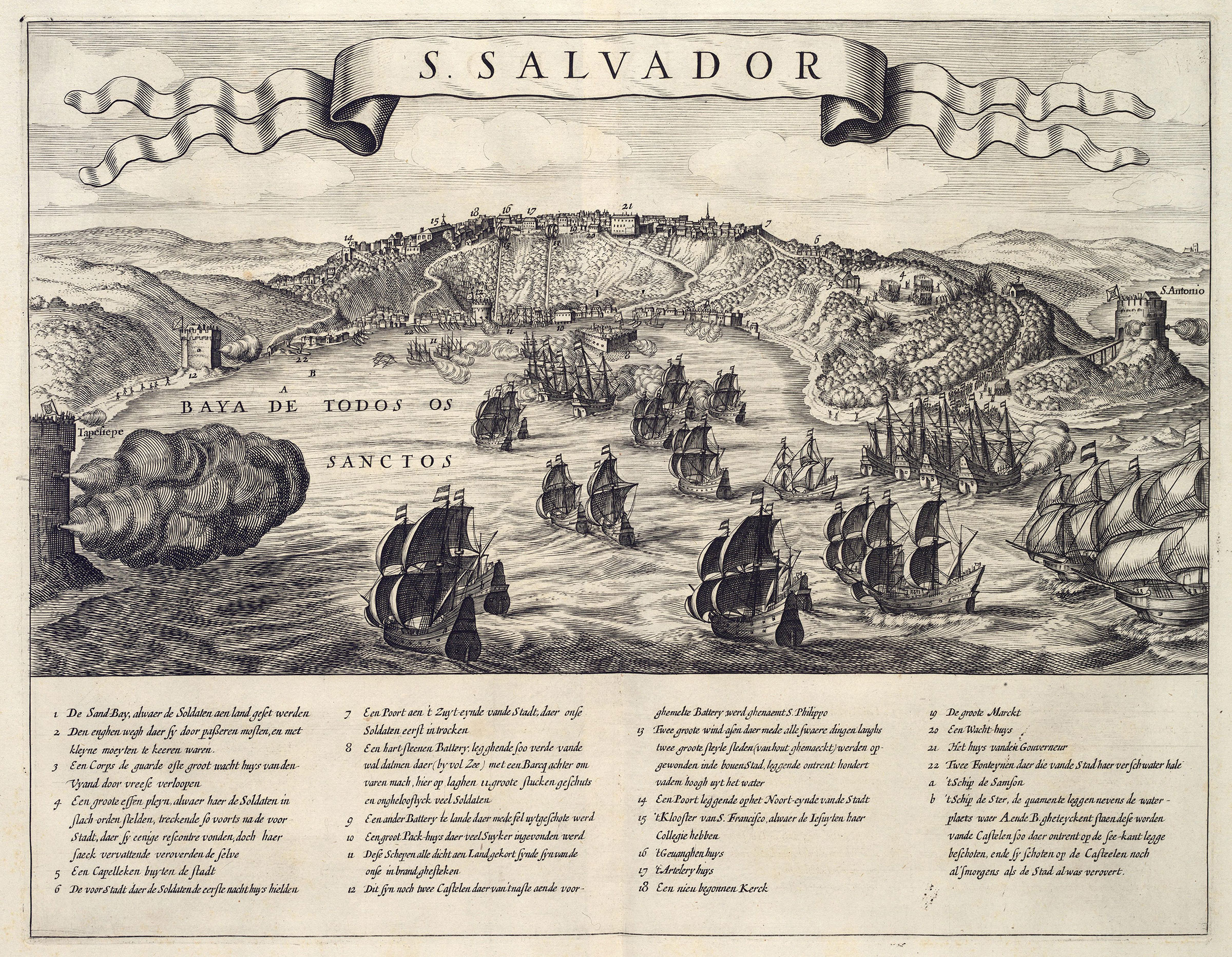
May 8: The Capture of Bahia in Portuguese Brazil is made by the Dutch East India Company

1624 (MDCXXIV) was a leap year starting on Monday of the Gregorian calendar and a leap year starting on Thursday of the Julian calendar, the 1624th year of the Common Era (CE) and Anno Domini (AD) designations, the 624th year of the 2nd millennium, the 24th year of the 17th century, and the 5th year of the 1620s decade. As of the start of 1624, the Gregorian calendar was 10 days ahead of the Julian calendar, which remained in localized use until 1923.

== Events ==
=== January–March ===
- January 14 – After 90 years of Ottoman occupation, Baghdad is recaptured by the Safavid Empire.
- January 22 – Korean General Yi Gwal leads an uprising of 12,000 soldiers against King Injo in what is called then the Joseon Kingdom, and occupies Hanseong.
- January 24 – Afonso Mendes, appointed by Pope Gregory XV as Prelate of Ethiopia, arrives at Massawa from Goa.
- February 7 – (January 28, 1623/4 old style) England first colonizes Saint Kitts and Nevis.
- February 11 – Yi Gwal installs Prince Heungan, son of the late King Seongjo, to the Korean throne.
- February 15 – Yi Gwal's Rebellion ends as the rebels murder Yi Gwal at the town of Mukbang-ri.
- February 16 – Kara Mustafa Pasha becomes the Ottoman Governor of Egypt for the second time.
- February 19
  - King Filipe III of Portugal issues a decree prohibiting the enslavement of Chinese people in Portugal or in its colonies.
  - The last parliament of King James I of England begins its session.
- February 28 – A decree is issued in Norway making it illegal for Jesuits or Roman Catholic monks to be harbored in the country.
- March 2 – The English House of Commons passes a resolution making it illegal for a Member of Parliament (MP) to quit or willfully give up his seat. Afterward, MPs who wish to quit are appointed to an "office of profit", a legal fiction to allow a resignation.
- March 25 – In a ceremony, Ferdinand II, Holy Roman Emperor, renews his oath to restore Catholicism in Germany, Bohemia, Hungary and Croatia.

=== April–June ===
- April 13 – Garcia Mvemba a Nkanga is enthroned as King Garcia I of the southern African nation of Kongo (now in Angola), upon the death of his father, King Pedro II.
- April 15 – The University of Saint Francis Xavier is founded in Bolivia.
- April 29 – Louis XIII of France appoints Cardinal Richelieu to the Conseil du Roi (Royal Council).
- May 8 – Capture of Bahia: A Dutch West India Company fleet captures the Brazilian city of Salvador, Bahia from the Portuguese Empire (at this time in the Iberian Union).
- May 11 – a major earthquake in Fez, Morocco, estimated magnitude 6.0 M_{w}, causes severe damage and thousands of casualties.
- May 24
  - The city of Oslo, Norway, is destroyed by fire for the fourteenth time. King Christian IV of Denmark–Norway decrees its rebuilding on a new site, where it will be renamed Christiania.
  - After years of unprofitable operation, Virginia's charter is revoked, and it becomes a royal colony.
- May 25 – The Scottish city of Dunfermline is destroyed by fire, but The Abbey, The Palace, the Abbot House and many other buildings survive.
- May – The first Dutch settlers arrive in New Netherland; they disembark at Governors Island.
- June 10 – Treaty of Compiègne is signed between the Kingdom of France and the Dutch Republic.

=== July–September ===
- July 30 – A contingent of 5,000 Chinese troops and 50 warships under the command of Admiral Yu Zigao and General Wang Mengxiong attacks the Dutch fortress at the island of Magong, the largest of the Penghu islands under the command of Martinus Sonck. Outnumbered, the Dutch surrender in five days.
- August 4 – The Dutch East India Company agrees to Chinese demands to withdraw its operations from the Penghu islands, and relocates its trading post to Fort Zeelandia and the Dutch-controlled island of Formosa, now Tainan on Taiwan.
- August 5 – The King's Men perform Thomas Middleton's satire A Game at Chess at the Globe Theatre in London. The performances are suppressed on August 14 in view of the play's allusions to the Spanish Match.
- August 13 – Cardinal Richelieu is appointed by Louis XIII of France to be his chief minister, having intrigued against Charles de La Vieuville, Superintendent of Finances, arrested for corruption the previous day.
- August 24 – Jasper Vinall becomes the first person to die while playing the sport of cricket, after being struck on the head with a bat during a game at Horsted Keynes in England.
- August 28 – The Siege of Breda begins, and will continue for just over 9 months until June 5, 1625.
- August – Portuguese Jesuit priest António de Andrade becomes the first European to enter Tibet, arriving at Tsaparang.
- September 4 – The Parlement of Paris registers a decree forbidding the publication of criticism of "anciently approved authors" without prior approval from the Faculty of Theology of the University of Paris, on pain of death.
- September 13 – Ketevan, former queen consort of Kakheti (located around Gremi in what is now the Republic of Georgia), is tortured and killed in the Persian city of Shiraz after refusing to renounce Christianity to convert to Islam.
- September 19 – Michael I, the Tsar of Russia, is married at Moscow, making Maria Dolgorukova the Tsaritsa. Maria becomes ill shortly afterward and dies five months after the marriage, on January 17.
- September 21 – The Roman Catholic church's Dicastery for the Clergy issues a decree that no monk may be expelled from his order "unless he be truly incorrigible."

=== October–December ===
- October 3 – A combined squadron of fifteen Neapolitan (Spain), Tuscan, and Papal galleys defeat a squadron of six Algerian ships on the island of San Pietro, near Sardinia. (details)
- November 3 – Rodrigo Pacheco becomes the Viceroy of New Spain after arriving in Mexico City.
- December 24 – Denmark's first postal service is launched by order of King Christian IV.

=== Date unknown ===
- The Japanese shōgun expels the Spanish from Japan, and severs trade with the Philippines.
- Henry Briggs publishes Arithmetica Logarithmica.
- Jakob Bartsch first publishes a chart, showing the constellation Camelopardalis around the North Star.
- Queen Nzinga of Ndongo and Matamba starts to rule.
- Frans Hals produces the painting later known as the Laughing Cavalier.
- The German-language Luther Bible is publicly burned, by order of the Pope.
- A confrontation between Swedish and Danish councillors ends with a Swedish diplomatic victory due to Sweden's ability to mobilize quickly.

== Births ==
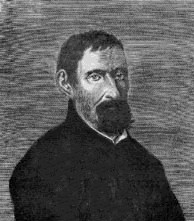
Guarino Guarini

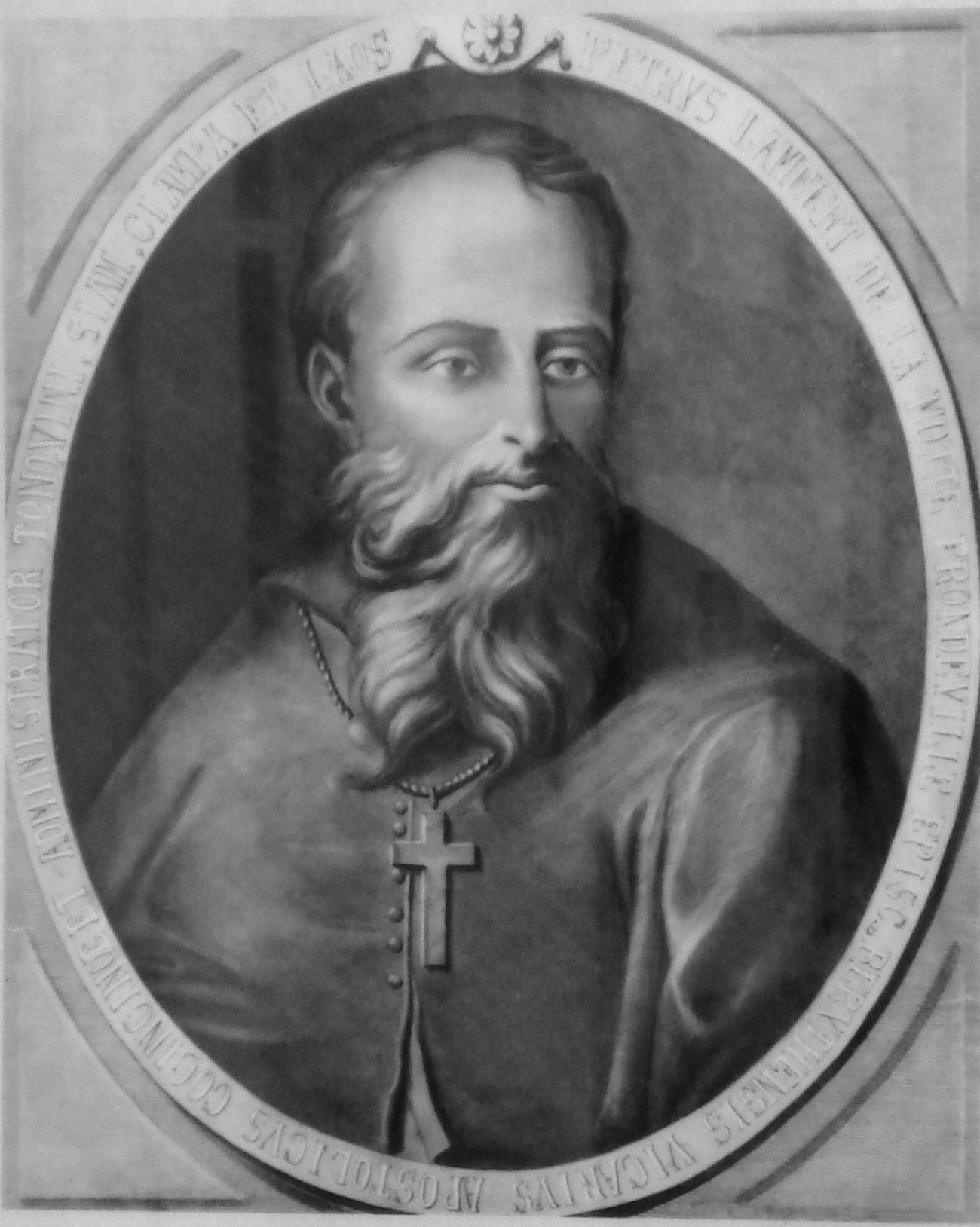
Pierre Lambert de la Motte

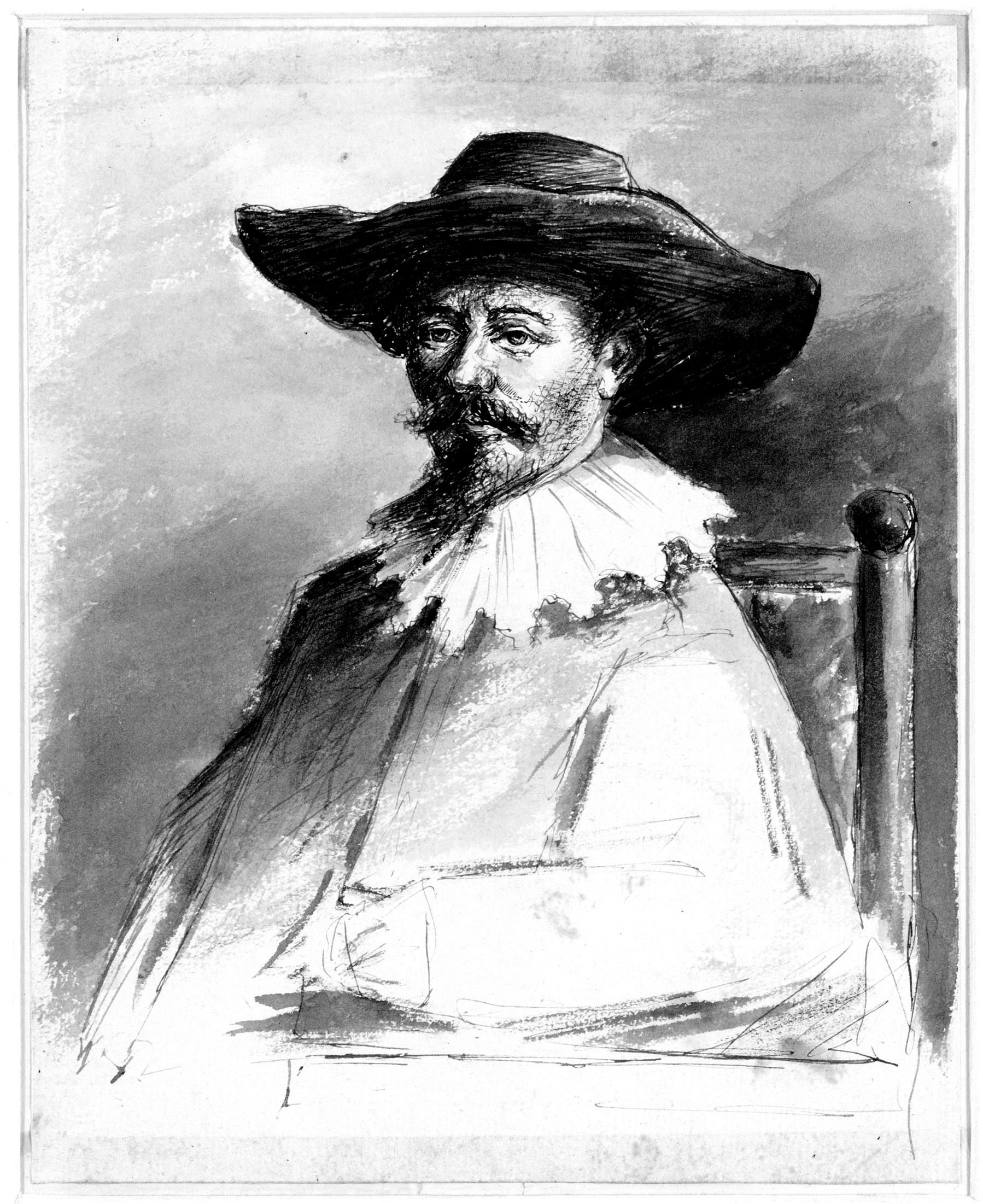
Lambert Doomer

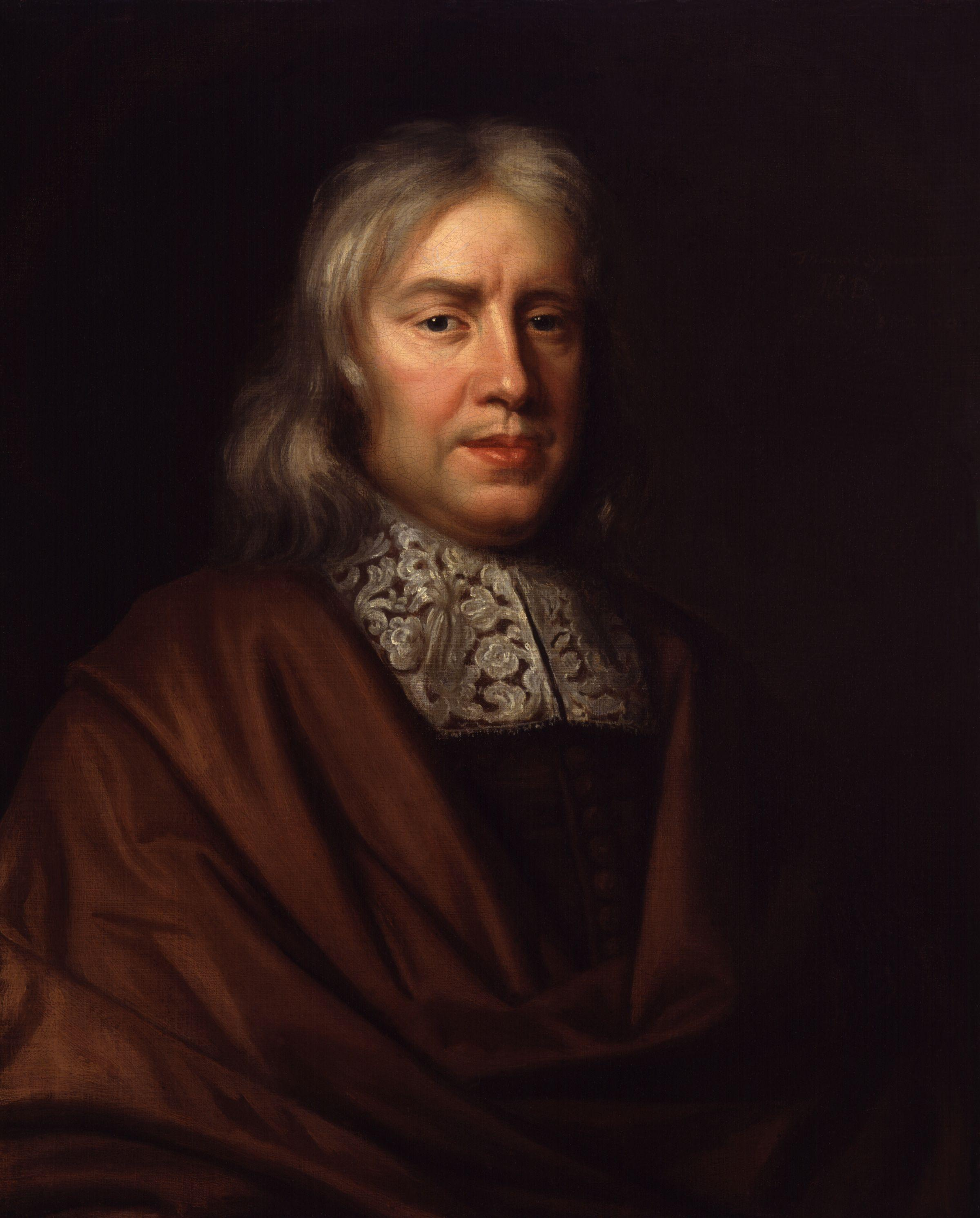
Thomas Sydenham

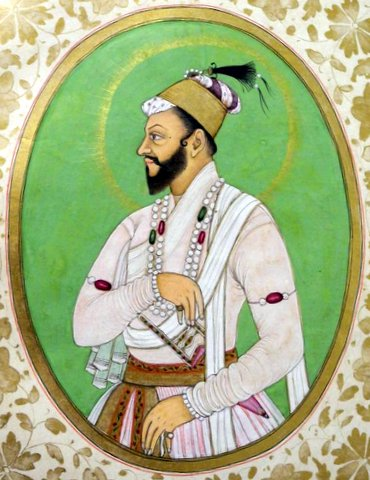
Murad Bakhsh

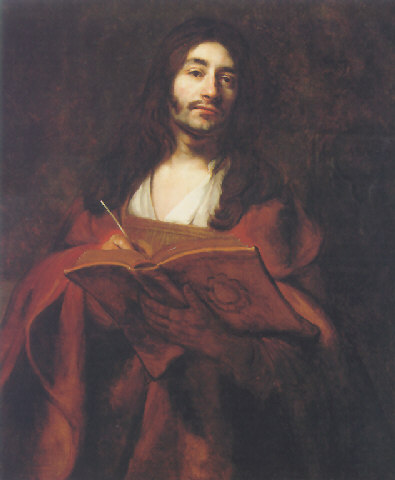
Barent Fabritius

=== January–March ===
- January 7 – Guarino Guarini, Italian architect of the Piedmontese Baroque (d. 1683)
- January 9 – Empress Meishō of Japan (d. 1696)
- January 15 – Rombout Verhulst, Dutch sculptor (d. 1698)
- January 16 – Pierre Lambert de la Motte, French bishop (d. 1679)
- January 18 – Thyrsus González de Santalla, Spanish theologian elected Superior General of the Society of Jesus (d. 1705)
- January 26 – George William, Duke of Brunswick-Lüneburg (d. 1705)
- January 31 – Arnold Geulincx, Flemish philosopher (d. 1669)
- February 11
  - Ivan Ančić, Croatian theological writer (d. 1685)
  - Lambert Doomer, Dutch Golden Age landscape painter (d. 1700)
- February 23 – Robert Treat, American colonial leader (d. 1710)
- March – Jane Leade, English esotericist (d. 1704)
- March 6 – Johann Georg Albinus, German pastor and hymnist (d. 1679)
- March 12 – Damian Hartard von der Leyen-Hohengeroldseck, German archbishop (d. 1678)
- March 20 – William Jones, English lawyer, Deputy Governor of Connecticut (d. 1706)
- March 21
  - François Roberday, French Baroque organist and composer (d. 1680)
  - Paolo Segneri, Italian Jesuit (d. 1694)
- March 25 – William Pulteney, English Member of Parliament (d. 1691)
- March 31 – Antoine Pagi, French ecclesiastical historian (d. 1699)

=== April–June ===
- April 4 – François Marie, Prince of Lillebonne, French nobleman and member of the House of Lorraine (d. 1694)
- April 9 – Henrik Rysensteen, Dutch military engineer (d. 1679)
- April 12 – Charles Amadeus, Duke of Nemours (d. 1652)
- April 15 – Pieter Nijs, Dutch Golden Age painter (d. 1681)
- April 20 – Samuel Mearne, English Restoration bookbinder and publisher (d. 1683)
- April 24 – Jan Peeters I, Flemish Baroque painter (d. 1677)
- April 25 – Sir Lionel Tollemache, 3rd Baronet, English baronet (d. 1669)
- April 26 – Johann Leusden, Dutch Calvinist theologian (d. 1699)
- May 13 – Aleksander Kazimierz Sapieha, Polish nobleman and archbishop (d. 1671)
- May 23 – William Duckett, English politician (d. 1686)
- May 30 – Leopold Frederick, Duke of Württemberg-Montbéliard, German noble (d. 1662)
- June 11 – Jean-Baptiste du Hamel, French cleric and natural philosopher (d. 1706)
- June 15 – Hiob Ludolf, German orientalist (d. 1704)
- June 16 – William Bradford, American political and military leader (d. 1703)
- June 20 – Henry Albin, English minister (d. 1696)
- June 26 – James Scudamore, English politician (d. 1668)

=== July–September ===
- July – George Fox, English founder of the Quakers (d. 1691)
- July 11 – John Collins, English academic and politician (d. 1711)
- July 18 – Francis Pemberton, English judge, Lord Chief Justice of the King's Bench (d. 1697)
- August 6 – Charles Kerr, 2nd Earl of Ancram, English politician (d. 1690)
- August 11 – John Strode, English politician (d. 1679)
- August 22 – Jean Regnault de Segrais, French poet and novelist born in Caen (d. 1701)
- August 23 – Anna Elisabeth of Saxe-Lauenburg, Landgravine consort of Hesse-Homburg (d. 1688)
- August 24 – Petronella de la Court, Dutch art collector (d. 1707)
- August 25 – François de la Chaise, French churchman (d. 1709)
- August 27 – Koxinga, Chinese military leader (d. 1662)
- September 1 – Simón González de Acosta, Spanish colonial governor (d. 1653)
- September 10 – Thomas Sydenham, English physician (d. 1689)
- September 12 – Wingfield Cromwell, 2nd Earl of Ardglass, English nobleman (d. 1668)
- September 15 – Francesco Provenzale, Italian Baroque composer and teacher (d. 1704)

=== October–December ===
- October 5 (bapt.) – Gaspar de Witte, Flemish painter (d. 1681)
- October 9 – Murad Bakhsh, Mughal prince (d. 1661)
- October 19 – Robert Danvers, English politician (d. 1674)
- October 20 – Jan Albertsz Rotius, Dutch painter (d. 1666)
- October 21 – Edward Harley, English politician (d. 1700)
- October 26 – Dosoftei, Moldavian Metropolitan (d. 1693)
- October 30 – Paul Pellisson, French author (d. 1693)
- November 2 – Sir Thomas Myddelton, 1st Baronet, English politician (d. 1663)
- November 3 – Jean II d'Estrées, French noble (d. 1707)
- November 16 – Barent Fabritius, Dutch painter (d. 1673)
- November 28 – Angélique de Saint-Jean Arnauld d'Andilly, French Jansenist nun (d. 1684)
- December 16 – Queen Jangnyeol, Korean royal consort (d. 1688)
- December 17 – Juriaen Jacobsze, Dutch painter (d. 1685)
- December 18 – John Hull, American colonial merchant and politician (d. 1683)
- December 25 – Angelus Silesius, German writer (d. 1677)

=== Date unknown ===
- Louise de Prie, French royal governess (d. 1709)
- Torii Tadaharu, Japanese nobleman (d. 1651)
- William Tucker, first known African-American born in the Colony of Virginia (d. unknown)

=== Approximate date ===
- Female Greenland shark (still alive in 21st century).

== Deaths ==
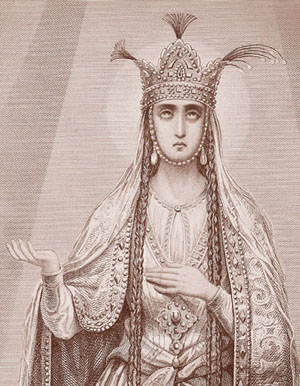
Ketevan the Martyr

Willem Pieterszoon Buytewech

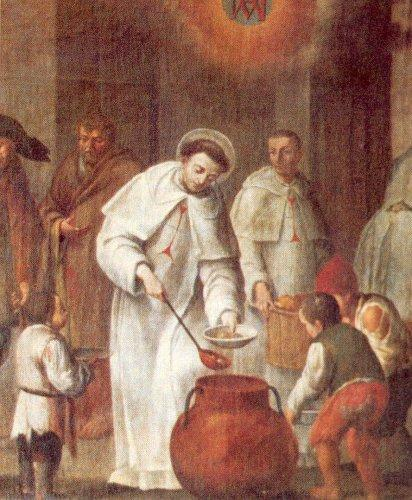
Simón de Rojas

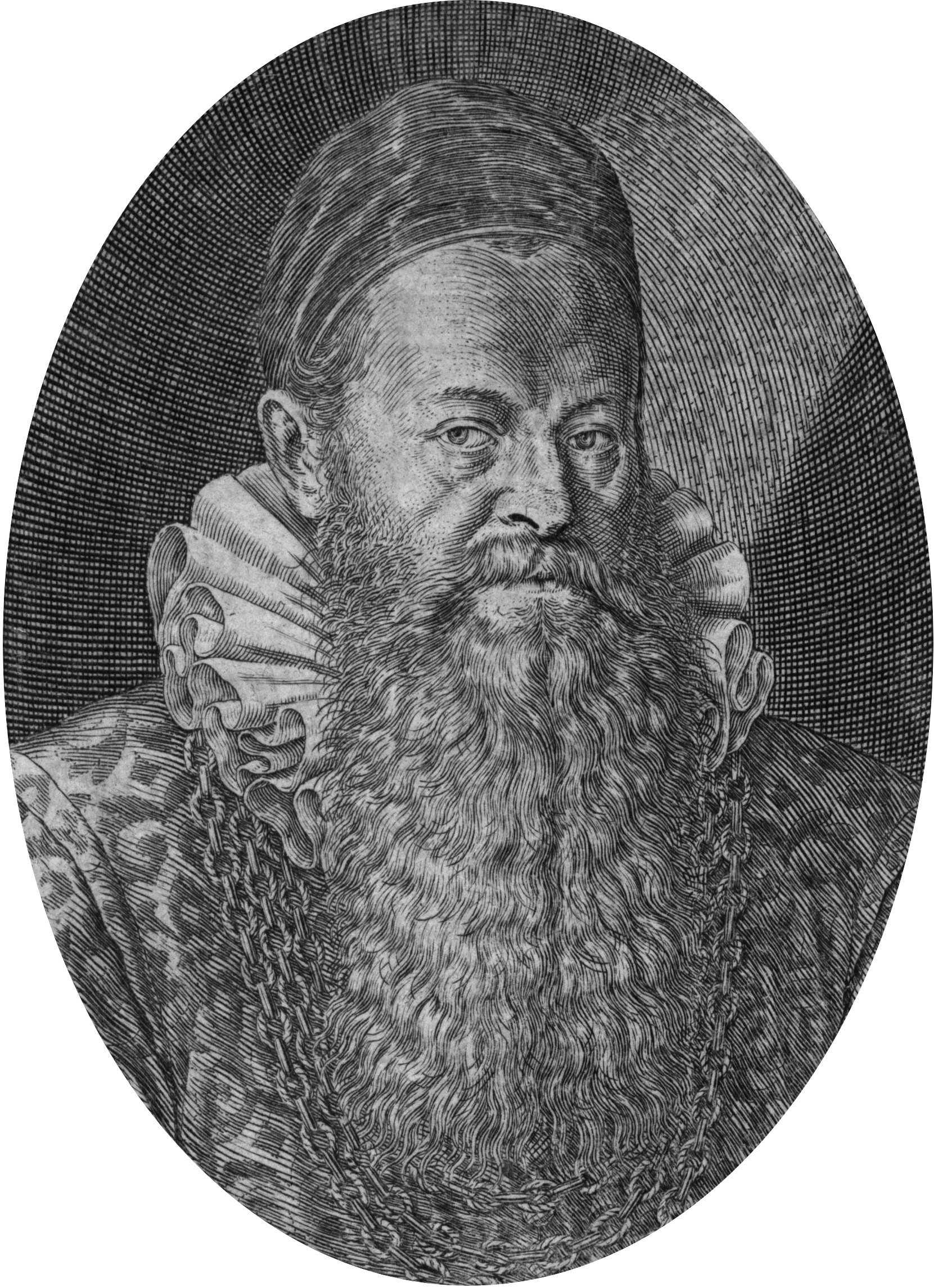
Gaspard Bauhin

John Kendrick

=== January–March ===
- January 3 – Jacopo Inghirami, Tuscan admiral (b. 1565)
- January 17 – Tamás Erdődy, Hungarian noble, Ban of Croatia (b. 1558)
- January 24 – Martin Becanus, Dutch Jesuit priest (b. 1563)
- February 4 – Vicente Espinel, Spanish writer (b. 1550)
- February 6 – Lamoral, 1st Prince of Ligne (b. 1563)
- February 7 – Cort Aslakssøn, Norwegian astronomer (b. 1564)
- February 12 – George Heriot, Scottish goldsmith and philanthropist (b. 1563)
- February 13 – Stephen Gosson, English satirist (b. 1554)
- February 16 – Ludovic Stewart, 2nd Duke of Lennox, Scottish nobleman and politician (b. 1574)
- February 17 – Juan de Mariana, Spanish historian (b. 1536)
- February 18 – Francis Ros, first Latin Archbishop of Angamaly-Cranganore (b. 1559)
- February 19 – Thomas Fleming, English politician (b. 1572)
- February 21 – John Adolph, Duke of Schleswig-Holstein-Sonderburg-Norburg, Duke of Norburg at Als (b. 1576)
- February 24 – Paul Laurentius, German divine (b. 1554)
- February 28 – Clemens Timpler, German philosopher (b. 1563)
- March 15 – Louis of Anhalt-Köthen, German prince (b. 1607)
- March 27 – Ulrik of Denmark, Danish prince-bishop (b. 1578)
- March 28 – Richard Sackville, 3rd Earl of Dorset, English noble (b. 1589)

=== April–June ===
- April 13 – William Bishop, first Roman Catholic bishop after the English Reformation (b. 1553)
- April 17 – Mariana Navarro de Guevarra Romero, Spanish Catholic nun who became a member of the Mercedarian Tertiaries (b. 1565)
- May 27 – Diego Ramírez de Arellano, Spanish sailor and cosmographer (b. c. 1580)
- June 2 – Jacques l'Hermite, Dutch admiral and explorer (b. 1582)
- June 4 – Rombertus van Uylenburgh, Dutch lawyer (b. 1554)

=== July–September ===
- July – Alonso Fajardo de Entenza, governor of the Philippines
- July 17 – Johan van Dorth, Dutch noble (b. 1574)
- July 22 – García de Silva Figueroa, Spanish diplomat and traveller (b. 1550)
- July 31 – Henry II of Lorraine (b. 1563)
- August 4 – Emanuel Filibert of Savoy, Viceroy of Sicily (b. 1588)
- August 21 – Francesco Andreini, Italian actor (b. c. 1548)
- August 25 – Luis Sotelo, Spanish Franciscan friar (b. 1574)
- September – Marco Antonio de Dominis, Dalmatian archbishop and apostate (b. 1560)
- September 13 – Ketevan the Martyr, queen of Kakheti (b. c. 1560)
- September 17 – Gilles du Monin, Belgian Jesuit historian (b. 1565)
- September 18 – Pedro Osores de Ulloa, Royal Governor of Chile (b. 1554)
- September 23 – Willem Pieterszoon Buytewech, Dutch Golden Age painter (b. 1592)
- September 25 – Fronton du Duc, French Jesuit theologian (b. 1558)
- September 29 – Simón de Rojas, Spanish saint (b. 1552)

=== October–December ===
- November 2 – Cornelis van der Voort, Dutch painter (b. 1576)
- November 5 – James Wriothesley, Lord Wriothesley, English politician (b. 1605)
- November 10 – Henry Wriothesley, 3rd Earl of Southampton, English patron of the theatre (b. 1573)
- November 13 – Thomas van Erpe, Dutch Orientialist, cartographer (b. 1584)
- November 14 – Costanzo Antegnati, Italian composer, organist (b. 1549)
- November 15 – Caius of Korea, Japanese martyr (b. 1571)
- November 17 – Jakob Böhme, German mystic (b. 1575)
- December 5 – Gaspard Bauhin, Swiss botanist (b. 1560)
- December 6 – Francesco Contarini, Doge of Venice (b. 1556)
- December 9 – Flaminio Scala, Italian playwright and stage actor (b. 1552)
- December 14 – Charles Howard, 1st Earl of Nottingham, English statesman (b. 1536)
- December 15 – Jerónimo Bautista Lanuza, Spanish friar, bishop and writer (b. 1533)
- December 25
  - Hajikano Masatsugu, Japanese samurai (b. 1545)
  - Catherine of Nassau-Dillenburg, German noble (b. 1543)
- December 28 – Charles of Austria, Bishop of Wroclaw, Prince-bishop of Wroclaw (b. 1590)
- December 29 – Dermod O'Brien, 5th Baron Inchiquin, Irish baron (b. 1594)
