= Domingo González =

Domingo González may refer to:

- Domingo González de Acosta (1628–1715), Spanish politician in the colonial Americas
- Domingo González (baseball) (born 1999), Dominican baseball pitcher
- Domingo González (cyclist) (born 1970), Mexican cyclist
- Domingo González (footballer) (1947–1979), Colombian footballer
- Domingo González (jurist) (1837–1923), Uruguayan lawyer and writer, Supreme Court justice
- Domingo González Mateos (1895–1958), Spanish bullfighter known as Domingo Dominguín
- Domingo González Pérez (1842–1927), Costa Rican politician
