= Margaretha van Valckenburch =

Dutch shipowner

Margaretha van Valckenburch (20 August 1565 – 16 July 1650) was a Dutch shipowner. She was the only woman to have been a stockholder or bewindhebbers of the Dutch East India Company (VOC).

Margaretha van Valckenburch was born to the rich silk merchant Jan van Valckenburch (c. 1538–1603) and Elisabeth van Vaerleer (died 1623) and married the rich trader Marcus de Vogelaer (1566?-1610) in 1587. Upon the death of her spouse in 1610, she was left with ten minor children to support. She inherited a fortune from both her father and her spouse and managed one of the biggest trading companies in the Netherlands, sending her ships to trade in Russia and the Republic of Venice. She inherited the stocks of her spouse in the VOC, but increased the investment in the company.
