= Action of 3 October 1624 =

Naval engagement that took place near San Pietro Island, Sardinia

- Part of Spanish–Ottoman wars
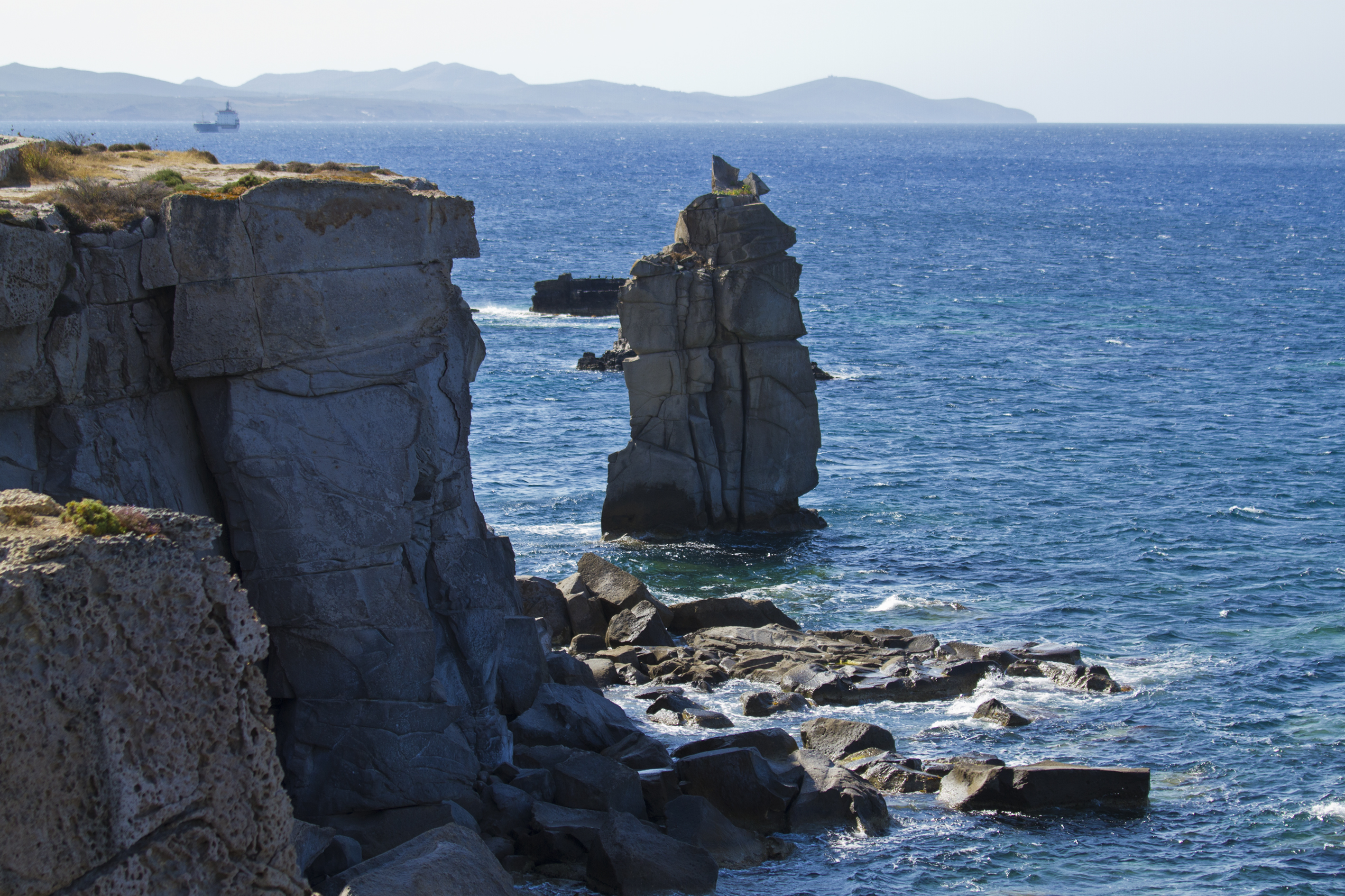
- San Pietro Island, off which the action was fought.
Date	3 October 1624
Location	Near San Pietro Island, Sardinia, Mediterranean Sea 39°08′44″N 8°18′21″E
Result	Spanish/Tuscan/Papal victory

Belligerents
Spain: (Spain) Naples; Tuscany; Papal States	Regency of Algiers

Commanders and leaders
(Spain) Diego Pimentel (WIA)	Azan Calafate (POW)

Strength
15 galleys: 8 Neapolitans (Spain); 4 Tuscans; 3 Papal	3 large ships 2 pataches 1 tartane

Casualties and losses
Unknown	100+ killed 150 prisoners 1 large ship destroyed 2 large ships captured 2 pataches captured 1 tartane lost

The action of 3 October 1624 was a naval engagement that took place near San Pietro Island, Sardinia, during the war against the Barbary corsairs. A squadron of galleys from the Spain (Kingdom of Naples), Grand Duchy of Tuscany and Papal States under Diego Pimentel engaged a squadron of six Algerian ships under Azan Calafate. The Algerians were defeated, their flagship was destroyed, and four ships were captured. Also, the Christian slaves they owned were freed.

== Background ==
To deal with the constant threat of Barbary corsairs in the Mediterranean Sea, the Christian states in the area combined their galley squadrons to defend their coasts and carry out incursions into Barbary bases. Emanuel Filibert of Savoy, who in 1622 was appointed by Philip IV of Spain as Captain General of the Sea and Viceroy of Sicily, mobilized squadrons from Sicily, Naples, Malta, and occasionally from the Republic of Genoa and Tuscany in combined operations.

In 1624, there were several engagements at sea between these combined squadrons and the Barbary corsairs, where the former made several captures of corsairs.

== Previous movements ==
On 8 September, Diego Pimentel, commander of the Naples galley squadron, set sail from Naples with his squadron to make an incursion along the western coast of the Italian Peninsula in search of Barbary corsairs. At that time, Barbary ships were known to loot the coasts of Corsica and Sardinia. Pimentel's forces consisted of a combined squadron of fifteen Christian galleys; eight Neapolitan galleys under Pimentel, four Tuscan galleys under Montauto and three Papal galleys under Filicaja. The Tuscan galleys were the last to join the squadron, near the island of Elba.

Pimentel, with the combined squadron, passed along the coast of Corsica to the Strait of Bonifacio, without encountering adversaries. Then he passed across the strait to Sardinia and arrived in Cagliari on 26 September 1624. In Cagliari, Pimentel consulted with Juan Vives de Canyamás, viceroy of Sardinia, if he had information about the Barbary corsairs, but he knew nothing. That same day he left the place for the island of San Pietro, a place frequented by corsairs.

On September 28 he arrived at the island, remaining in place. At dawn on 3 October, he sighted a squadron of six corsairs ships of Barbary. It was a squadron of the Regency of Algiers; made up of three large ships, two pataches and a tartane. One of the large ships was the flagship, with 200 Turkish and 36 or 50 guns. The two remaining large ships were merchant prizes, one of them weighing 400 to 500 tons, both being armed by the corsairs. The two pataches had a crew of 50 men. The squadron commander was Azan Calafate, a renowned Turkish sailor from Algiers.

== Battle ==
At eight in the morning, Pimentel's galley squadron had the Algerian ships within firing range. The tartane, abandoned by the rest of the Algiers squadron, was captured with a Turkish on board, who gave information to the Christians about the opposing squadron. The battle began, and after four hours of fighting, the Christians captured one of the large ships after it was disabled and abandoned by the crew, who moved to the flagship. Soon another of the large ships was also captured, but Algiers' flagship held up fierce resistance, causing extensive damage to the approaching galleys. Pimentel ordered all the galleys to direct their shots at him. Due to the short distance between the opponents, Pimentel was seriously wounded in the stomach by a musket shot from that ship. On the other hand, the pataches began to flee, so Pimentel ordered Francisco Manrique to pursue them with eight galleys. Manrique managed to capture the pataches. Meanwhile, the Algerian flagship was disabled and overwhelmed by the attack of the other galleys. The corsairs set fire to the gunpowder, causing a large explosion that destroyed the flagship after eight hours of fighting.

== Aftermath ==
In the battle more than 100 corsairs were killed and there were 150 prisoners, among them Calafate. There were also almost 200 slaves, freeing 100 Christians. The two large ships and the two pataches were escorted by the galleys to Cagliari, their salvage bringing a good quantity of ducats. The tartane that had been initially captured was lost during the fight. On this occasion the Spaniards did not carry out the demonstrations that they usually carried out for victory, due to the death of Pimentel from his wound, the next day.

== See also ==
- Barbary slave trade

== Bibliography ==
- Fernández Duro, Cesáreo (1898). Armada española desde la unión de los reinos de Castilla y Aragón (in Spanish). Vol. IV. Madrid, España: Instituto de Historia y Cultura Naval.
- Fernández Duro, Cesáreo (1885). El gran duque de Osuna y su marina: Jornadas contra turcos y venecianos (1602-1624) (in Spanish). Madrid, España: Sucesores de Rivadeneyra.
- Anderson, R. C. (1952). Naval wars in the Levant, 1559-1853. Princeton: Princeton University Press.
