= Camillo Graffico =

Italian engraver

Camillo Graffico (or Grafico) (1565–1615) was an Italian engraver born in Cividale del Friuli.
