= Hajikano Masatsugu =

Japanese samurai

Hajikano Masatsugu (初鹿野 昌次, 1545 – December 25, 1624) was a Japanese samurai of the Sengoku period, who served as general of ashigaru (demanding post) the Takeda clan. He lived well into the early Edo period.
