= Paola Massarenghi =

Italian composer

Paola Massarenghi (born August 5, 1565) was an Italian composer. Only one of her works survives, Quando spiega l'insegn'al sommo padre, a spiritual madrigal. It was printed in Arcangelo Gherardini's Primo libro de madrigali a cinque voci. The publication, from Ferrara in 1585, is dedicated to Alfonso Fontanelli, and while other contributors are listed in the dedication, Massarenghi was left out. Massarenghi probably came from a wealthy family, since they were able to get Duke Ranuccio I Farnese to help get a musical education for Massarenghi's younger brother, Giovanni Battista Massarenghi, also a composer.
