= Mariana Navarro de Guevara =

Blessed Mariana Navarro de Guevara OdeM
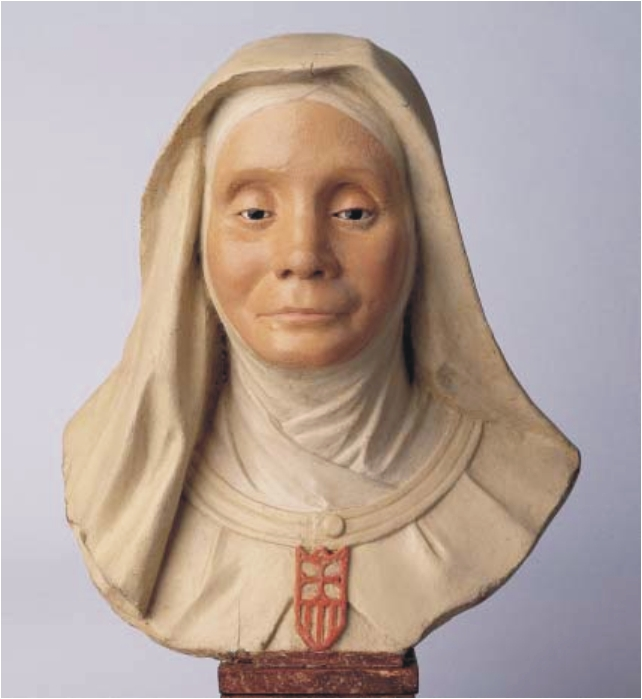

Virgin
- Born: 17 January 1565; Madrid, Habsburg Spain
- Died: 17 April 1624 (aged 59); Madrid, Habsburg Spain
- Venerated in: Roman Catholic Church
- Beatified: 25 May 1783, Saint Peter's Basilica, Papal States by Pope Pius VI
- Feast: 17 April
- Attributes: Religious habit, crucifix, lily, Sacred heart of Jesus

Mariana Navarro de Guevara, in full Mariana Navarro de Guevara Romero (17 January 1565 – 17 April 1624) was a Spanish Roman Catholic nun who became a member of the Mercedarian Tertiaries. Upon admittance she took the religious name Mariana of Jesus. She was noted for a life of penance and an emphasis on devotion to the Eucharist and is sometimes called the "Lily of Madrid".

Pope Pius VI beatified her after the recognition of two miracles; the cause still continues.

== Life ==
Mariana Navarro de Guevara was born on January 17, 1565 in Madrid, the oldest of six children and the only daughter. Her father was Ludovico Navarro Guevara and her mother was Joan Romero. Her father supplied leather goods to the Spanish court. The poet Lope de Vega was a playmate. His father was an embroiderer, and the people who worked for the court lived in the same neighborhood.

She was pious as a child and cared for her brothers after the death of her mother. Her father remarried and her new stepmother seemed to dislike her for reasons unknown. Her father desired that she get married and leave home but she desired to be married to Jesus Christ and to devote her life to him. She turned down a marriage proposal at the age of 23. She tried to join several religious orders but was not accepted because of an illness that prevented her from using her hands freely.

Guevara met a priest who suggested to her that she become a member of a religious order known as the Mercedarians. From 1598 her spiritual director was Fr. Jaun Bautista Ganzáles of the local Mercedarian house. In 1611 the discalced Mercedarians relocated to Santa Barbara, and she settled in a nearby cottage. She spent hours in worship of the Eucharist and counseled people who came to her for advice. She was well known for her patience and kindness with everyone she met. She became one of several tertiaries into the order who made their final profession in 1613. She took the name "Mariana of Jesus" and devoted herself to charitable acts towards the sick and the poor. She was distinguished by her life of penance, devotion to the Eucharist and her intense prayer life.

She died on 17 April 1624 after a severe illness.

== Veneration ==
She had a widespread reputation for holiness. Her remains are preserved incorrupt in the church of the Mercedarian Nuns of Don Juan Alarcón in Madrid. Cardinal Gabriel Trejo Paniagua - Bishop of Malaga wrote a detailed and long report on her life.

The introduction to the cause of beatification bestowed upon her the title of Servant of God and it opened in Madrid. Pope Clement XIII recognized her life of heroic virtue and proclaimed her to be Venerable on 9 August 1761.

Pope Pius VI approved two miracles attributed to her intercession on 31 August 1782 and beatified her in 1783. A third miracle attributed to her and needed for her canonization was investigated from 8 March 2011 to 11 November 2013 and received formal ratification on 2 May 2014.

Her memorial day is April 17. Mariana is the patroness of the Mercedarian Third Order.

The Association of Friends of Mariana of Jesus for the poor of Madrid collects food for distribution to the poor, just as she did.
