= Domingo González de Acosta =

Spanish politician (1628–1715)

Domingo González de Acosta y Sanabria

Alcalde of Buenos Aires
- In office 1689–1690
- Monarch: Charles II of Spain
- Preceded by: ?
- Succeeded by: ?

Personal details
- Born: 1628 Buenos Aires, Argentina
- Died: 1715 (aged 86–87) Buenos Aires, Argentina
- Occupation: Politician
- Profession: militia
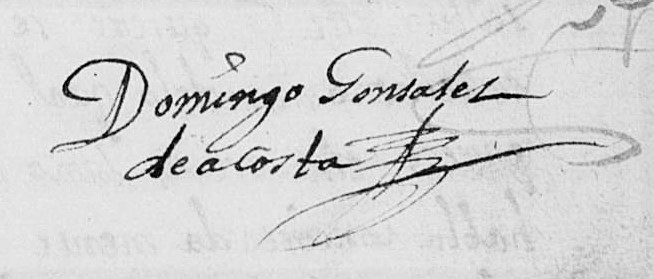
- Signature

Military service
- Allegiance: Spanish Empire
- Branch/service: Spanish Army
- Rank: Captain
- Unit: Fuerte de Buenos Aires

Domingo González de Acosta (1628–1715) was a Spanish politician, who served as alcalde and comandante of Buenos Aires during the Habsburg period.

== Biography ==
He was born in Buenos Aires, the son of Antonio González de Acosta, a Portuguese merchant, and María Sanabria, daughter of Antón García Caro and María Gómez Méndez de Sotomayor. His wife was Francisca Marquina, daughter of Francisco de Uzueña and Isabel Marquina, belonging to a family from Santiago del Estero.

Domingo González de Acosta was elected Mayor of first vote of the city of Buenos Aires in 1689. He also served as Mayordomo of Buenos Aires in 1660, and was appointed as Alférez Real, in charge of carrying the Royal standard during the festival of Saint Martin of Tours.
