= House at the Two Golden Bears =

- Dům U Dvou zlatých medvědů
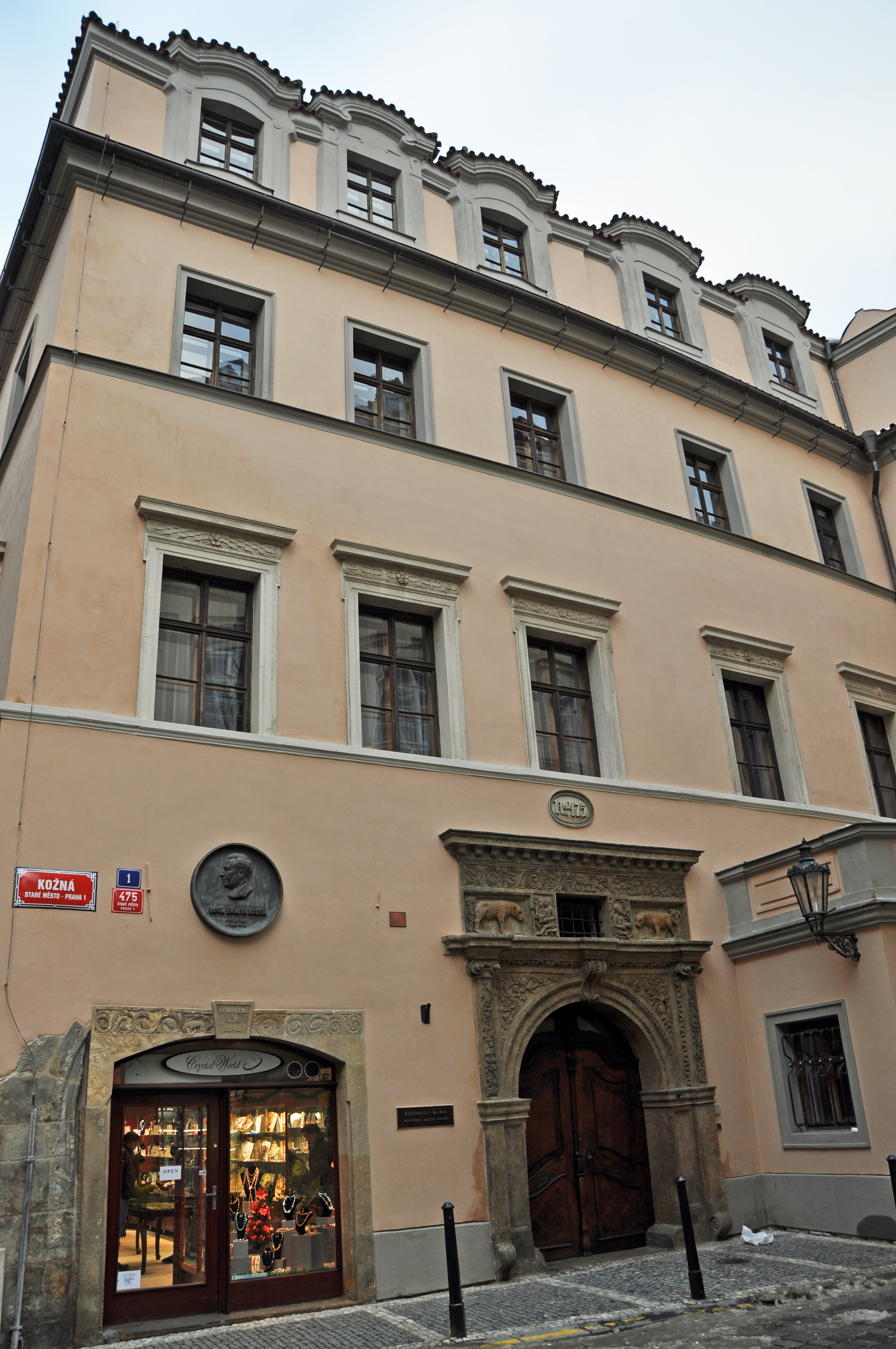
- Interactive map of the House at the Two Golden Bears area

General information
- Location: Kožná 475/1, Prague 1, 110 00, Prague, Czech Republic
- Coordinates: 50.0862°N 14.4208°E

House at the Two Golden Bears (Czech: Dům U Dvou zlatých medvědů) is a historic house in the Old Town area of Prague, Czech Republic. It is located in an alley off of Melantrichova Street in the Old Town.

== History ==
The first mention of the house is from the year 1403, when the house originated from two Gothic houses and a brewery. Gothic architecture remnants are found in the ground floor and basement. The house was rebuilt into the Renaissance style in two stages, before 1567 and before 1600. The house was enlarged during the Baroque reconstruction at the end of the 17th century. The third floor was added after 1726.

There are corridors underground that go from the basement of the house to Church of Our Lady before Týn and the Old Town Hall.

The house has a portal doorway which was built onto the house in 1590. The owner, Lorenc Stork, hired Bonifaz Wohlmut to design it. The doorway has two bears on it. The house has an remarkable Renaissance arcades and a portal.

In the mid-16th century, the house was owned by Jan Kosořský z Kosoře, famous for having printed the then-largest Czech book, the Münster Cosmography (1554). Writer and journalist Egon Erwin Kisch was born in the house, at the house is placed a plaque with his portrait.

Today, the building is owned by the Prague City Museum.
