= Old Town Hall (Prague) =

Historical building in the Czech Republic

- Staroměstská radnice
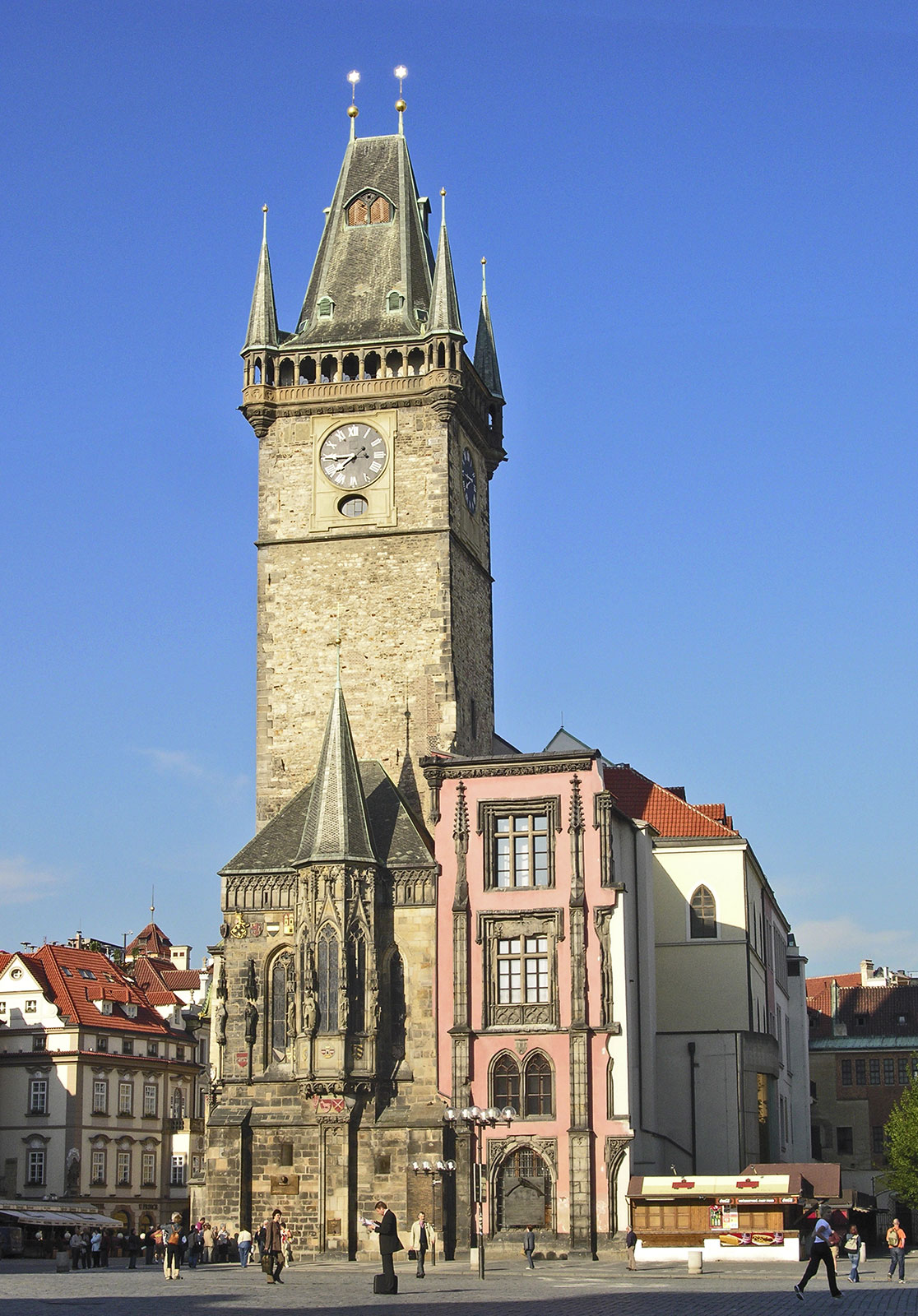

General information
- Location: Old Town Square, Prague 1, Czech Republic
- Coordinates: 50.0871°N 14.4207°E

Website
- Official website

The Old Town Hall (Czech: Staroměstská radnice) in Prague, the capital of the Czech Republic, is one of the city's most visited monuments. It is located in Old Town Square.

== History and architecture ==
=== Foundation of the Old Town Hall ===
In 1338, after receiving permission from John of Luxembourg, the councillors of the Old Town bought a large patrician house from the Volflin family and adapted it for their purposes. Over the following centuries the original Town Hall building largely disappeared as a result of renovations and expansion of the building; one external remnant of the original structure still visible today is the Gothic stone portal with mouldings on the western side of the building.

The burghers of the Old Town extended the original Town Hall towards the west by buying the adjoining house, and construction began of a stone tower on a square plan. The tower, which was the highest in the city in the Middle Ages, was completed in 1364, and has been largely unchanged since then.

The Town Hall is architecturally unusual, because it is constructed from many different smaller houses. The expansion continued in 1458 when Mikeš house was added to the west side. The Council Chamber in the east wing was vaulted with a net vault, supported by two pillars, at the end of the 15th century.

The Gothic "Cockerel" house was bought in 1835 and the "Minute" house was sold to the town council for the extension of the Town Hall in 1896. Mikeš house was rebuilt in the Neo-Renaissance style in 1879–1880, according to designs by Antonín Baum. This wing was destroyed in last days of World War II during the Prague uprising. Many architectural competitions were held during the 20th century, with the intention of finding the right architectonic design for the expansion and reconstruction of the Old Town Hall, but all of the competitions either failed to produce a winner, or the winning projects were not built.

=== Expansion of the Old Town Hall ===
The architectural development of the Old Town Hall in the Middle Ages was far from completed after the completion of the tower. Construction was interrupted due to the Hussite movement (1419–1434). In 1458 another house was bought on the west side, enabling extensive modifications to the interior of the building. New halls were established in the south wing, but only the council room on the upper floor was preserved in its original appearance.

Internal modifications reflected in the external reconstruction work can still be seen on the south facade. The reconstruction of the entrance hall on the ground floor of Volflin house terminated in the construction of a new portal in the Late Gothic style, the predominant style of urban architecture in the Czech Lands for over 100 years. The Gothic arch of the portal has archivolts rich in stone ornaments. Decorated brackets support the outer arch which is a typical late-Gothic ogee arch crowned by an imposing finial. The brackets on either side of the portal terminate in slender pinnacles. The main structure dates from the end of the 15th century, but the wooden double door itself dates from 1652.

The window on the left of the portal was completed a few years later and retained the architectural style. The builder eschewed the traditional Gothic arch in favour of a rectangular window, adorning the thickness of the walls with panelled pilasters. A moulded stone cross divides the window into four lights, the upper two of which are decorated with the armorial bearing of the Old Town of Prague and the Czech lion. Between and slightly above them are the symbol "W", representing the royal initial of the Bohemian king Vladislaus II of Hungary (1456–1516) of the Jagiellon dynasty. Rich stone vegetable decorations adorn the top of the window.

The window in the south facade dates from the 1520s, and bears traces of an early Renaissance style. The central window itself is the only original part, as the two smaller wings were added in 1731. It has a high moulded cornice with plastic ornamentation. Brackets support panelled pilasters terminating in capitals on which rests the architrave with the inscription "Praga caput regni" (Prague, the capital of the kingdom). The window is surmounted by a semicircular tympanum with the armorial bearings of the Old Town of Prague. Generally speaking the lateral windows are kept in the same style as the original Renaissance main window, but the canopies above the pilaster, in the Gothic style, are an exception. The Renaissance style is also apparent in another window situated just above the Gothic portal of the Volflin house from the 16th century.

==== The Council Chamber ====
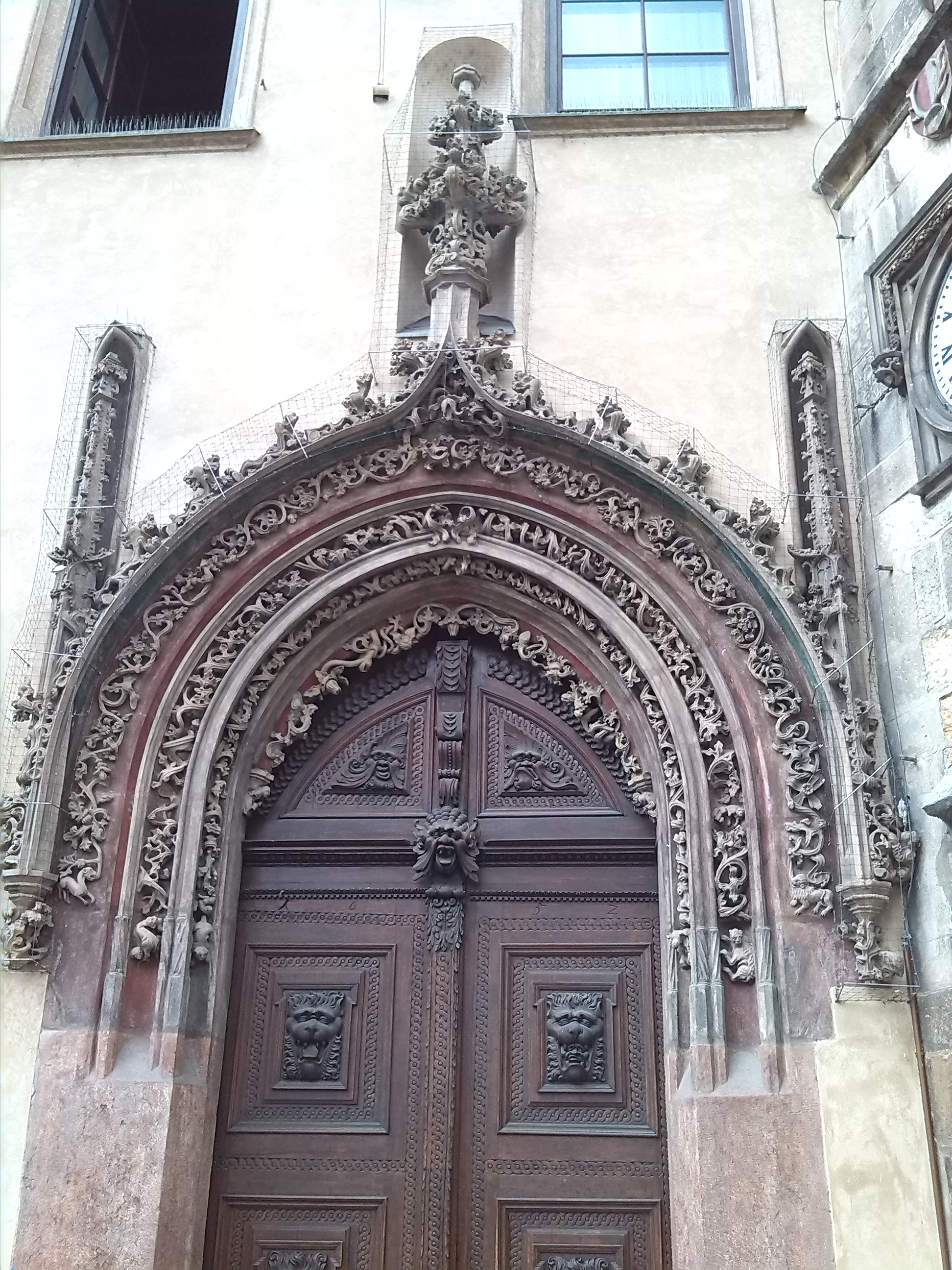
A late Gothic door in the house adjacent to the tower served as the main entrance to the Old Town Hall.

The extensive reconstruction of the Old Town Hall at the turn of the 15th and 16th century included the erection of the east wing adjoining the north wall of the tower. A monumental building was constructed during the Late Gothic period. There was a council chamber with a net vault that gave the room an atmosphere of spaciousness.

==== Reconstructions ====
The original structure was badly damaged by modifications at the end of the 18th century, and finally disappeared completely, when during the 1840s a new wing was built in a Neo-Gothic style. The original Gothic appearance of the east wing has only been preserved in old engravings.

The reconstruction also affected the historical core of the entire Town Hall complex. The interior of all three houses forming the south wing was reconstructed and Mikeš house, the third in the row, was renovated from the outside as well. Two Neo-Gothic gables and oriel were added to the facade and the architect Gruber adjusted the entrance by adding two semi-circular arches. Further renovations in 1879 gave the facade a Neo-Renaissance appearance and two high windows were added on the second floor, one of them bearing the inscription "Dignitatis memores—ad optima intenti" (Bearing in mind your dignity—do your best) on the architrave.

==== The destruction by fire of the East and the North Wing ====
The east wing and the addition of a further north wing was carried out during the reconstruction in the 19th century. Both these wings were destroyed by fire during the Prague uprising in May 1945 and only the surviving torso adjoining the tower gives an indication of how this part of the Old Town hall looked.

==== The Cockerel ====
In 1835 the south wing was further extended by the addition of a fourth house, "the Cockerel house", bought by the Town Council that year. In this very old building the Romanesque hall from the beginning of the 13th century has been preserved, and on the first and second floor are Late-Gothic halls with Renaissance ceilings. The facade was renovated in the first half of the 19th century in Empire style.

==== The Minute House ====
At the end of the 19th century, other buildings were added to the Town Hall block, including the "Minute" house, an originally Gothic house dating from the beginning of the 15th century, and decorated at the beginning of the 17th century by a series of sgraffito designs representing classical and biblical themes. Most of the later modifications affected only the interior of the house, and respected the historical exterior of the south wing.

== Interior of the Old Town Hall ==
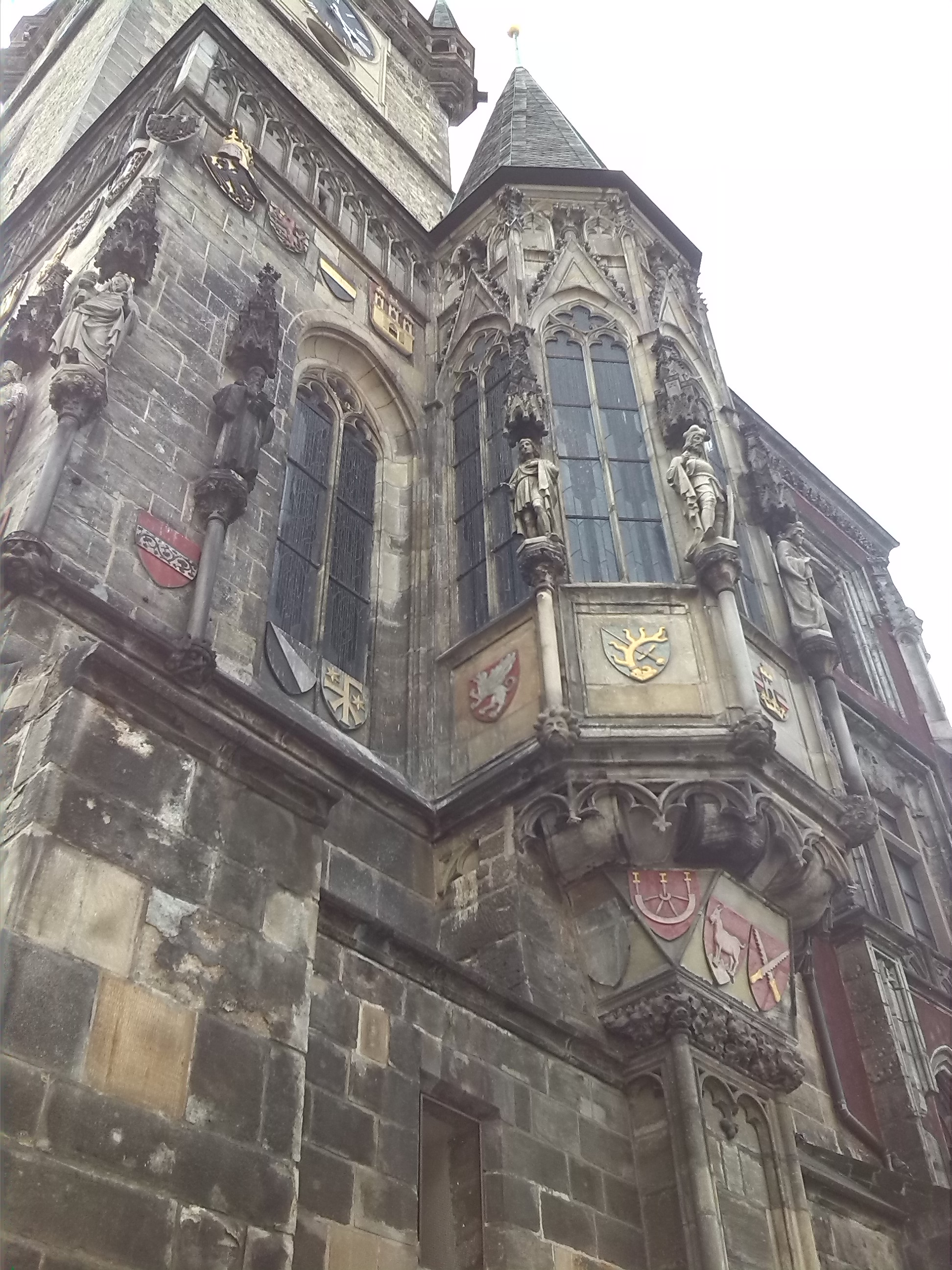
The Town Hall chapel in the tower, consecrated in 1381

The arrangement of the rooms is in keeping with the building's imposing exterior appearance.

=== The two entrance halls ===
The spacious entrance hall was established during reconstruction at the end of the 15th century. The Late Gothic vault adds to the impression of spaciousness of the entrance hall. There are two large mosaics on the lateral walls, created by Czech architect Vojtěch Ignác Ullmann according to designs by Mikoláš Aleš (1936–1939). The mosaic on the western wall uses themes taken from national mythology, showing Princess Libuše foretelling the glory of Prague. On the opposite wall is an allegory entitled "Slavdom's Homage to Prague". The ornaments of the vault contain coats of arms and symbolic depictions of great events from the nation's history. Modern renovations of the second entrance hall have modified the old architecture. There is a bronze statue by the Czech sculptor Josef Václav Myslbek, completed in 1885, depicting the legendary bard Lumír accompanied by the allegorical figure of Song.

=== The first floor ===
The staircase leading to the first floor was designed by architect Jan Bělský (1853–1854). Here the rooms have been adapted to host wedding ceremonies. The interior is in the Late-Gothic style from the first half of the 16th century. The facade is dominated by a wide Renaissance window. The vaults are decorated with paintings by Cyril Bouda, a Czech painter and illustrator.

=== The third floor ===
The Renaissance portal on the third floor with an intarsia door is from 1619. It is framed by red polished marble from the end of the 16th century. Two smooth columns with shaft-rings support an entablature with a gabled cornice containing a relief bust of the king and a cartouche with the inscription "Senatus". The portal is crowned by the armorial bearings of the Old Town flanked by allegorical figures representing Truth and Justice. The counterpart to the old portal is formed by a white marble entrance from 1945 bearing the inscription "Presidium". Through the portal is the vestibule, decorated with lunette-shaped pictures by Václav Brožík from the second half of the 19th century.

=== The Session Chamber ===
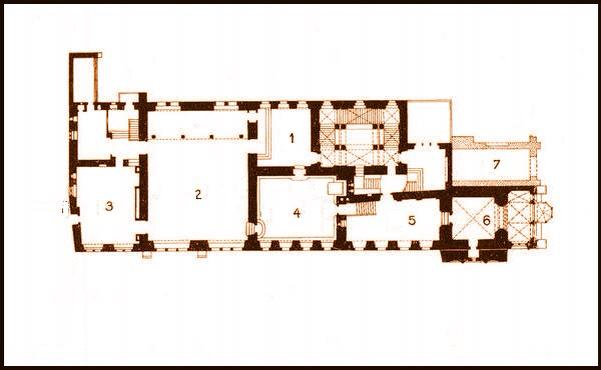
LEGEND TO THE SECOND-FLOOR PLAN OF THE OLD TOWN HALL: 1.Entrance Hall, 2.Session Chamber, 3.Jiřík Hall, 4.Old Council Chamber, 5.Public Hall, 6.Town Hall Chapel, 7.Torso of destroyed East Wing

All vestiges of the original architecture in the adjoining session chamber were erased during renovations in 1879–1910. The chamber is dominated by two large canvases, the work of painter Václav Brožík. One represents Jan Hus's defence before the Council of Constance in 1415, and the second one the election of Jiří of Podebrady in 1458. The adjoining Jiřík hall is decorated in the late-Gothic style with remnants of wall paintings dating from the end of the 15th century. Much of the historical decoration of this room was restored by architect Pavel Janák between 1936 and 1938.

=== The Council Chamber ===
The old council chamber flanking the session chamber on the other side is considered one of the most beautiful rooms in the Town Hall. Though renovated many times it has preserved its original late-Gothic character dating from about 1470. The wooden coffered ceiling, polychromed in the second half of the 16th century, rests on moulded beams strengthened in 1638 by the addition of strong gilded chains. The walls are adorned by Gothic wooden panelling, a number of emblems, and the armorial bearings of the Old Town. Both entrance portals are in a late-Gothic style. The most valuable feature in the interior, however, is a wooden sculpture from the beginning of the 15th century, of Christ Suffering. It is situated on a bracket decorated with the bust of an angel and the inscription "Juste iudicate filii hominis" (Judge justly, O Sons of Man), as a warning to the councillors sitting there. The statue is in the Czech Gothic style which was at its climax at the turn of the 14th and 15th centuries. The other sculptures in the old council chamber are more recent; the Madonna is from the 16th century, St. Wenceslas and St Ludmila from the 17th century and the statue of John the Baptist from the 18th century. The Baroque stove with a gilded grille and the statue of Justice date from 1736.

=== The Town Hall Chapel ===
The former public hall and the Town Hall Chapel are accessed through a metal-fitted door. The public hall, once intended for Town Council assembly sessions, was probably built in the second half of the 15th century along with the council chamber, but was completely destroyed during the fire in May 1945. The Town Hall chapel in the tower, consecrated in 1381, suffered a similar fate. Only the magnificent portal, one of the oldest preserved monuments, has survived. The semi-circular wall arch with rich mouldings is supported on slim columns terminating in Gothic pinnacles. There are emblems, often repeated, on the columns, which date from the reign of Wenceslas IV. The emblems consists of a kingfisher and the letter "E", surrounded by torse. Both the style and the personal emblems of Wenceslas indicate that the portal was built by the royal stonemasons' lodge.

=== The Hall of Architects ===
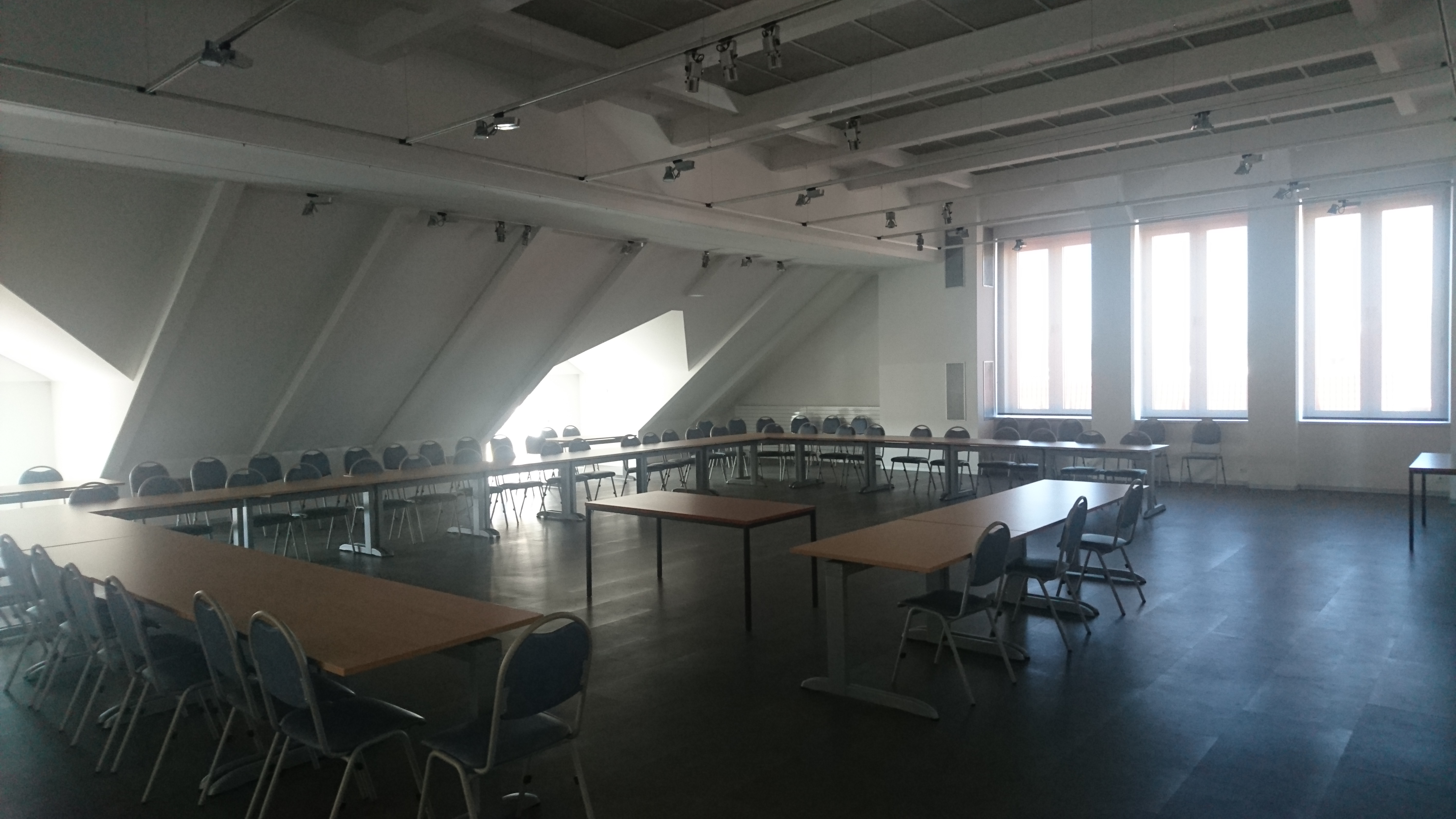
Interior of the Hall of Architects

The Institute for Planning and Development of the City of Prague organized and prepared exhibitions in the Hall of Architects at the Old Town Hall and co-organized informational events in the field of architecture, urban planning and spatial planning. The exhibition hall is located on the fifth floor in the attic of the Town Hall. This space is newly refurbished and equipped with modern technology for the events. Seminars, conferences and various exhibitions are held here. The Permanent exhibition is a Model of the City of Prague from the end of the 20th century at a scale of 1:1000.

== The Horologe ==
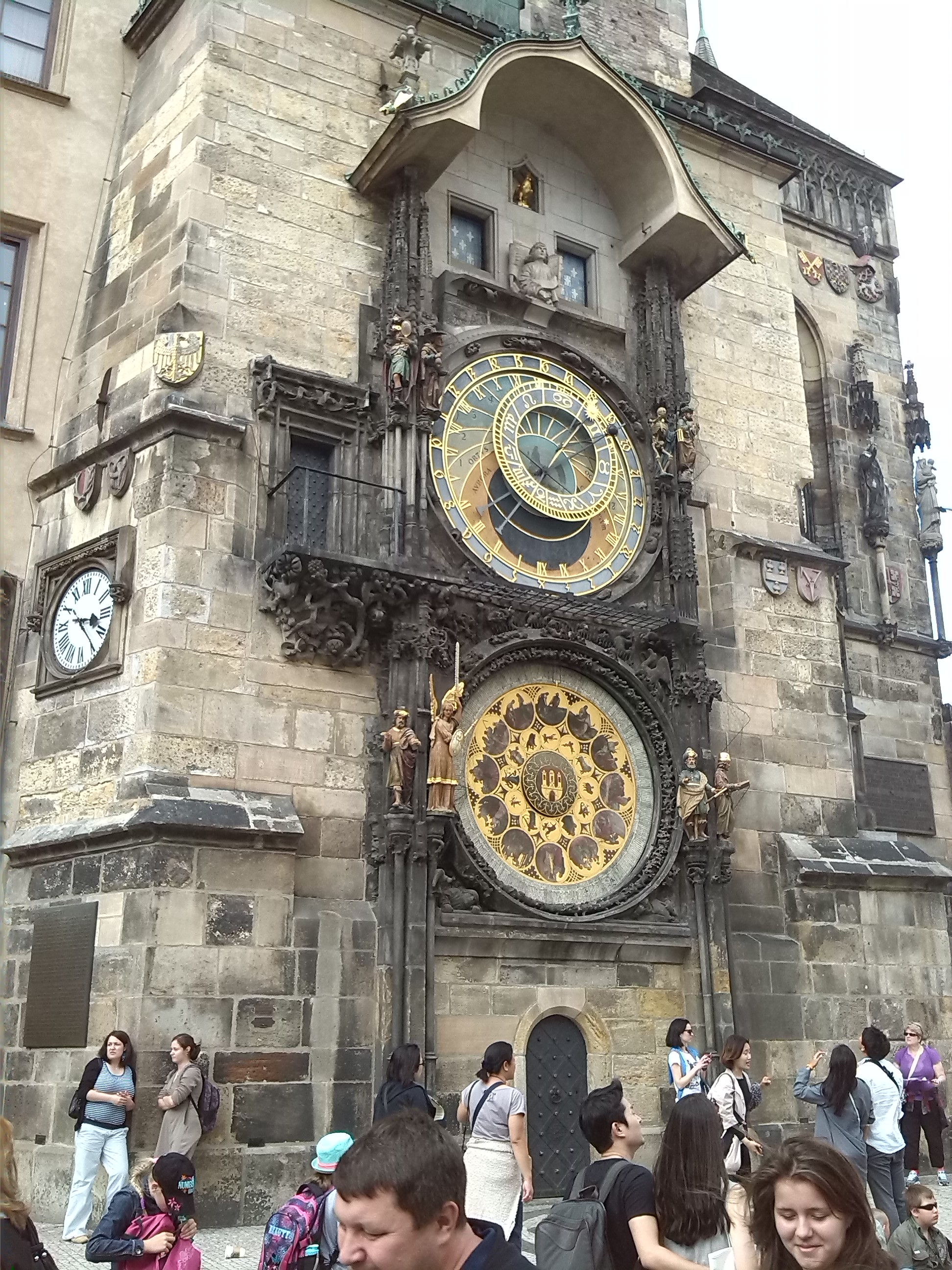
The horologe is the most fascinating feature of the Town Hall. It was first built in the first decade of the 15th century.

The horologe is the most famous feature of the Town Hall, first built in the 1400s. The first version was completed in 1410 by the clockmaker Mikuláš of Kadaň and the astronomer Jan Šindel. Later reconstructions changed the first design completely, but written records confirm that it already possessed all the basic features. The first extensive reconstruction was possibly carried out in 1490 by the clockmaster Jan Růže (also called Hanuš), an old town locksmith, who produced a timepiece based on the pendulum system, though the historical accuracy of Růže's contributions is disputed. The architectural decoration is also from this time, and consists of a system of slender late-Gothic columns framing the clock and rich plastic decorations of both figural and floral motifs.

Jan Táborský of Klokotská Hora repaired and perfected the clock in the years 1552–1572. Though some changes have been made since to the external appearance of the clock, its fundamental features have remained unchanged. The most recent repairs were carried out after the World War II when the badly damaged original figures were replaced by statues by Vojtěch Sucharda.

=== The statues of the Horologe ===
The horologe consists of three independent units: the moving figures, the astronomical dial, and the calendar dial. The figures are set in motion on the stroke of every hour by a complex mechanism.

== See also ==
- Czech Gothic architecture
