= Prague astronomical clock =

Medieval astronomical clock in the Czech Republic

- Pražský orloj (Czech)
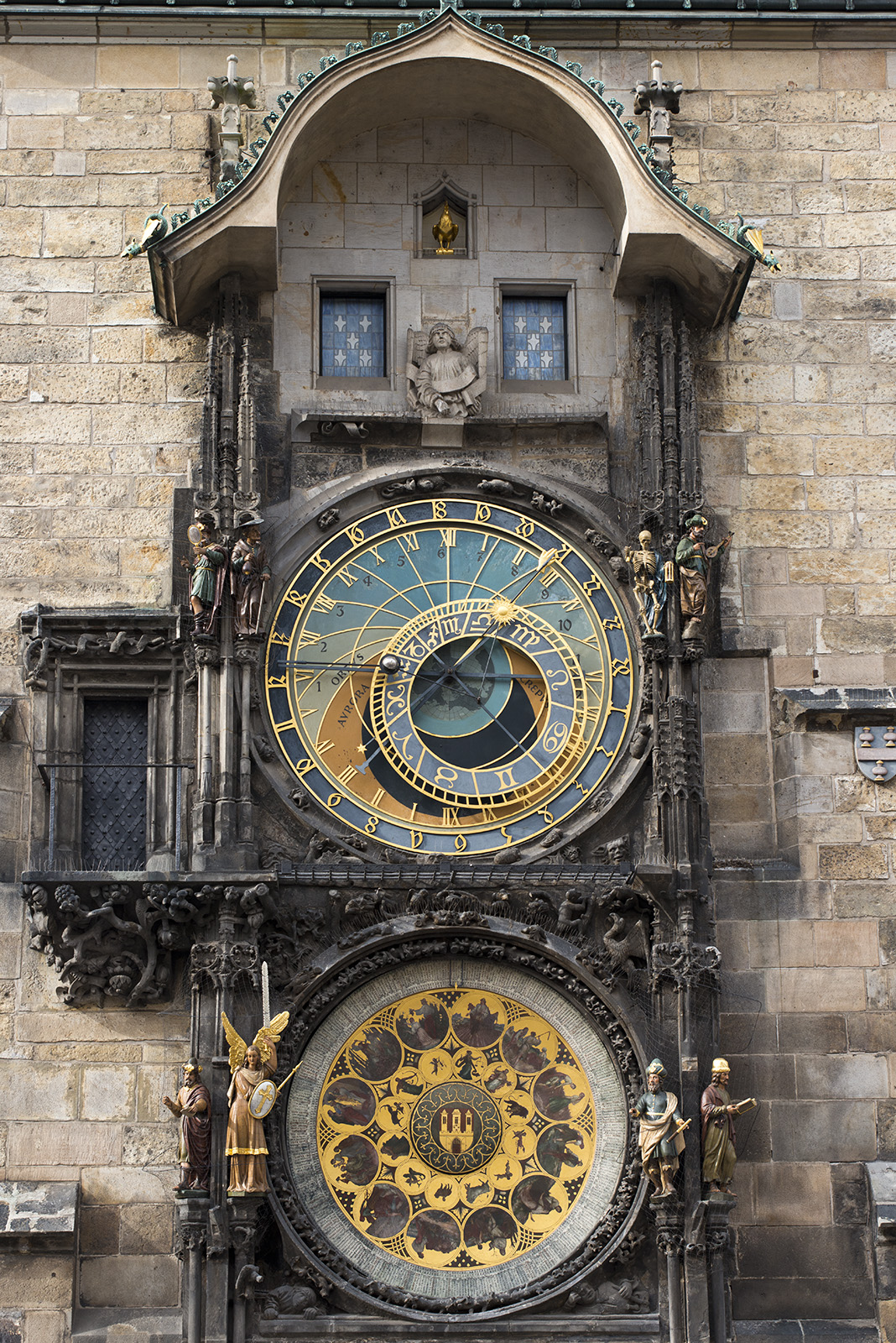

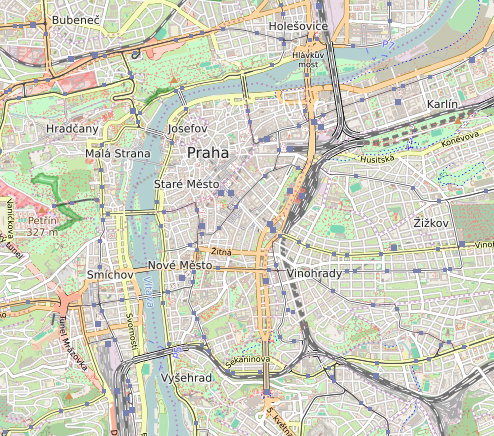
- Location in Prague
- Location: Prague 1, Czech Republic; 50°05′13.23″N 14°25′15.30″E
- Website: www.prague.eu/en/object/places/3129/astronomical-clock

The Prague astronomical clock, or Prague Orloj (Czech: Pražský orloj [praʃskiː orloj]), is a medieval astronomical clock attached to the Old Town Hall in Prague, the capital of the Czech Republic.

== Description ==
The Orloj is mounted on the southern wall of the city's Old Town Hall in the Old Town Square. The clock mechanism has three main components – the astronomical dial, representing the position of the Sun and Moon in the sky and displaying various astronomical details; statues of various Catholic saints stand on either side of the clock; "The Walk of the Apostles", an hourly show of moving Apostle figures and other sculptures, notably a figure of a skeleton that represents Death, striking the time; and a calendar dial with medallions representing the months. According to local legend, the city will suffer if the clock is neglected and its good operation is placed in jeopardy; a ghost, mounted on the clock, was supposed to nod its head in confirmation. According to the legend, the only hope was represented by a boy born on New Year's night.

== History ==
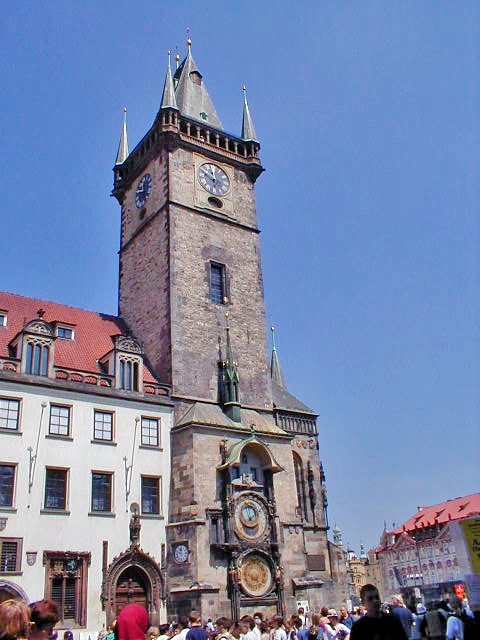
The clock tower

The oldest part of the Orloj, the mechanical clock and astronomical dial, dates back to 1410, when it was created by horologist Mikuláš of Kadaň and Charles University professor of mathematics and astronomy Jan Šindel. The first recorded mention of the clock was on 9 October 1410. Later, presumably around 1490, the calendar dial was added and the clock facade was decorated with gothic sculptures.

Formerly, it was believed that the Orloj was constructed in 1490 by clockmaster Jan Růže (also called Hanuš); this is now known to be a historical mistake. A legend, recounted by Alois Jirásek, has it that the clockmaker Hanuš was blinded on the order of the Prague Councillors so that he could not repeat his work; in turn, he disabled the clock, and no one was able to repair it for the next hundred years.

In 1552, it was repaired by Jan Táborský (1500–1572), master clockmaker of Klokotská Hora, who also wrote a report of the clock where he mentioned Hanuš as the maker of this clock. This mistake, corrected by Zdeněk Horský, was due to an incorrect interpretation of records from the period. The mistaken assumption that Hanuš was the maker is probably connected with his reconstruction of the Old Town Hall in the years 1470–1473. The clock stopped working many times in the centuries after 1552, and was repaired many times. The legend was used as the main plot in the 2008 animated film Goat story – The Old Prague Legends.

In 1629 or 1659, wooden statues were added, and figures of the Apostles were added after a major repair in 1787–1791. During the next major repair in the years 1865–1866 the golden figure of a crowing rooster was added.

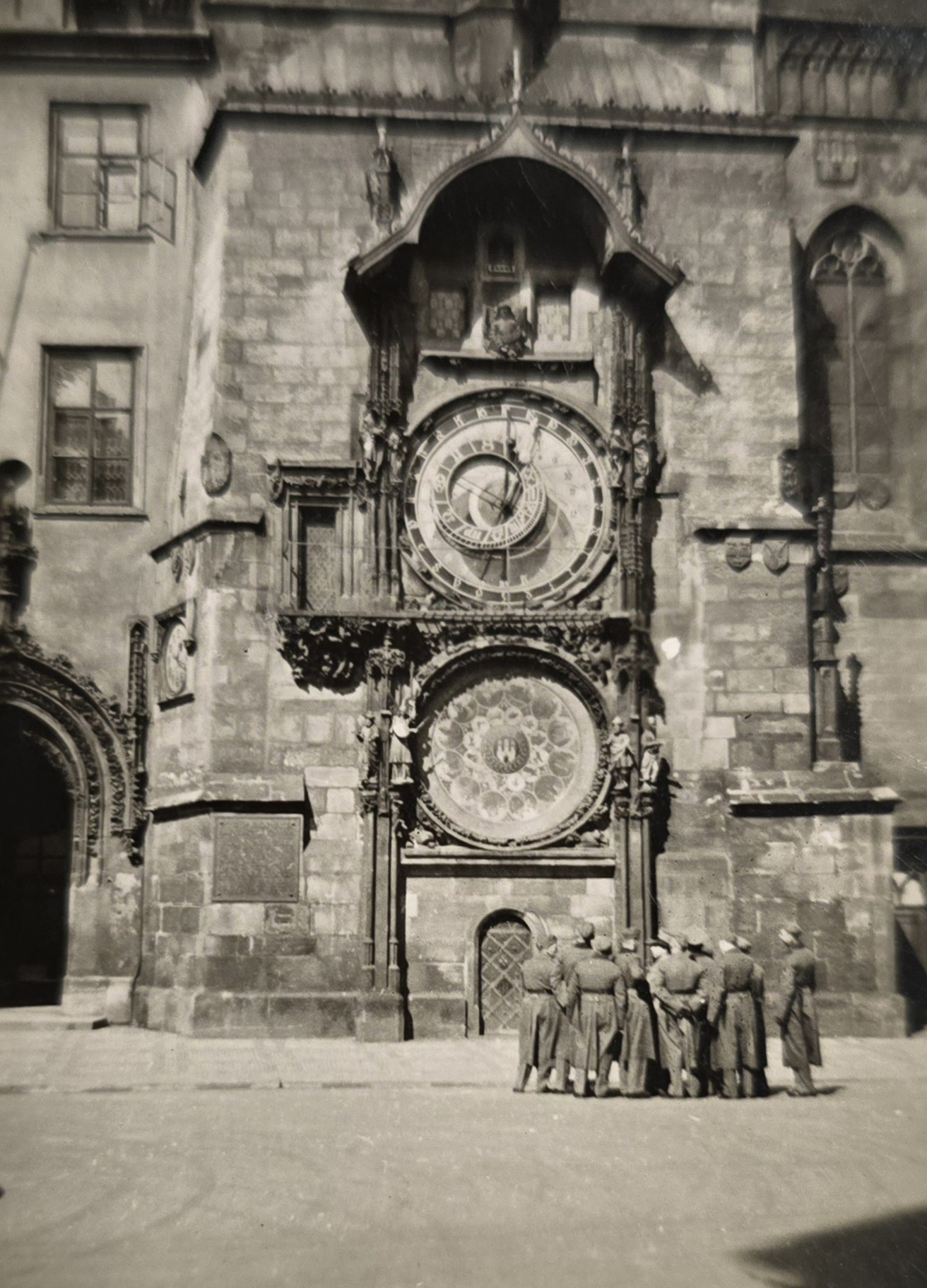
Astronomical Clock during Nazi occupation.

The Orloj suffered heavy damage on 7 and especially 8 May 1945, during the Prague uprising, when the Nazis fired on the south-west side of the Old Town Square from several armoured vehicles in an unsuccessful attempt to destroy one of the centers of the uprising. The hall and nearby buildings burned, along with the wooden sculptures on the clock and the calendar dial face made by Josef Mánes. After significant effort, the machinery was repaired, the wooden Apostles restored by Vojtěch Sucharda, and the Orloj started working again in 1948.

The Orloj was renovated in autumn 2005, when the statues and the lower calendar ring were restored. The wooden statues were covered with a net to keep pigeons away.

The last renovation of the astronomical clock was carried out from January to September 2018, following a reconstruction of the Old Town Tower. During the renovation, an electric clock mechanism that had been in operation since 1948 was replaced by an original mechanism from the 1860s.

=== 600th anniversary ===
On 9 October 2010, the Orloj's 600th anniversary was celebrated with a light show on the face of the clock tower. Two projectors were used to project several animated videos on the clock. The videos showed it being built, torn down, rebuilt, and peeled away to show its internal mechanisms and the famous animated figures, as well as various events in the clock's history. The video interacted with the tower's architecture, such as rain rolling off the arch, and showing the passage of time with moving shadows.

=== 605th anniversary ===
On its 605th anniversary, 9 October 2015, the Orloj appeared on the Google home page as a Google Doodle.

=== 2018 reconstruction ===
The Orloj was taken down for reconstruction and replaced by a LED screen in early 2018, with the restoration works scheduled to last for the whole summer tourist season of 2018 and the restored actual Orloj eventually being back in service soon enough to commemorate the 100th anniversary of Czechoslovakia at the end of October 2018. With the reconstruction and restoration work completed, it resumed operations at 6 p.m. local time on 28 September 2018.

=== 2022 reconstruction controversy ===
The artwork on the Orloj became the center of controversy after a local heritage group noticed the reproduction had "radically changed the appearance, ages, skin tone, dress and even genders of the figures" illustrated by Mánes in 1866. A member of the Club for Old Prague, Milan Patka, registered a complaint with the Ministry of Culture, alleging that in the restoration, painter Stanislav Jirčík had deviated from the "spirit and detail" of the original. The National Heritage Inspectorate began investigations into the allegations.

The Guardian reported that the artist may have put the likenesses of his friends and acquaintances into the work, "possibly as a joke." Upon this discovery, the Prague city council's deputy mayor for transport and heritage criticized the botched restoration as "banal and done by an amateur" and suggested the city might need to commission a replacement. It is not yet known how the restoration's discrepancy with the original had escaped detection when the work was installed in 2018.

== Astronomical dial ==
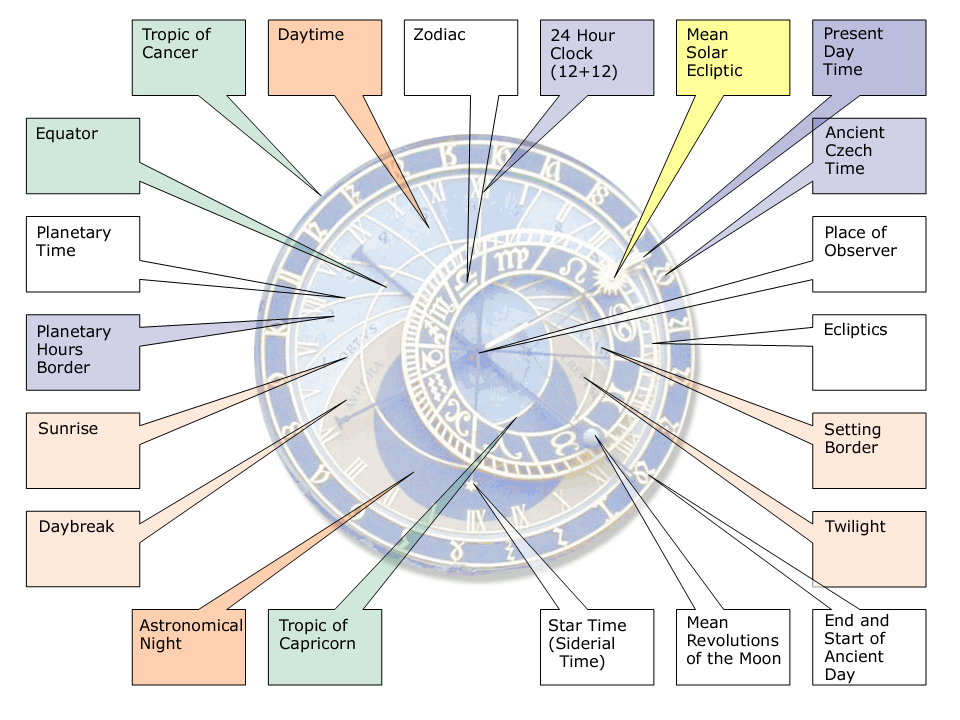
Functions noted

The astronomical dial is a form of mechanical astrolabe, a device used in medieval astronomy. Alternatively, one may consider the Orloj to be a primitive planetarium, displaying the current orientation of the universe relative to the Earth.

The astronomical dial has a background that represents the standing Earth and sky, and surrounding it operate four main moving components: the zodiacal ring, an outer rotating ring, an icon representing the Sun, and an icon representing the Moon.

=== Stationary background ===
The background represents the Earth and the local view of the sky. The blue circle directly in the centre represents the Earth, and the upper blue is the portion of the sky which is above the horizon. The red and black areas indicate portions of the sky below the horizon. During the daytime, the Sun sits over the blue part of the background and at night it sits over the black. During dawn or dusk, the mechanical sun is positioned over the red part of the background.

Written on the eastern (left) part of the horizon is aurora (dawn in Latin) and ortus (rising). On the western (right) part is occasus (sunset), and crepusculum (twilight).

Golden Roman numerals at the outer edge of blue circle are the timescale of a normal 24-hour day and indicate time in local Prague time, or Central European Time. Curved golden lines dividing the blue part of dial into 12 parts are marks for unequal "hours". These hours are defined as 1/12 of the time between sunrise and sunset, and vary as the days grow longer or shorter during the year.

=== Zodiacal ring ===
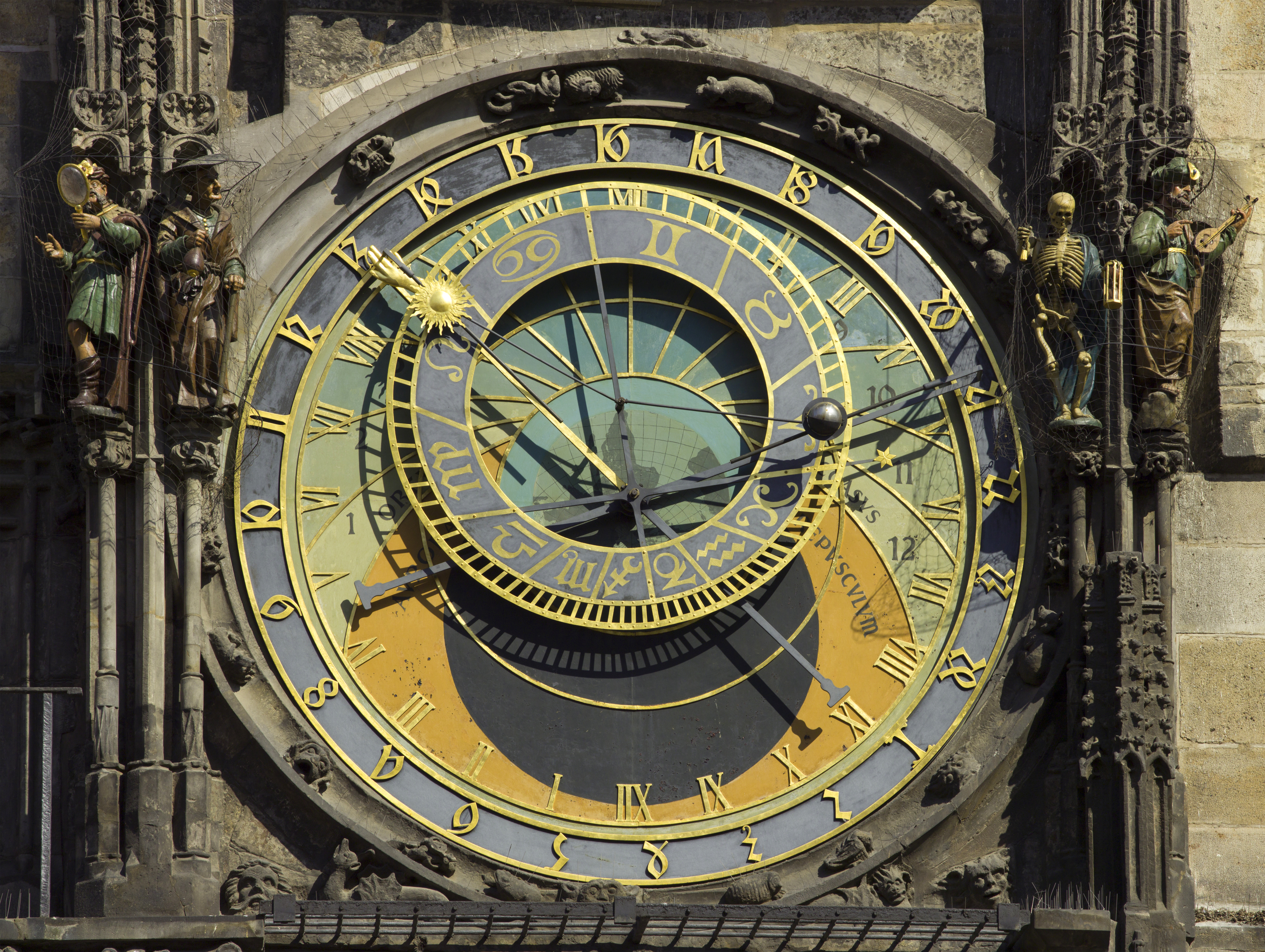
Astronomical dial

Inside the large black outer circle lies another movable circle marked with the signs of the zodiac which indicates the location of the Sun on the ecliptic. The signs are shown in anticlockwise order. In the photograph accompanying this section, the Sun is currently moving anticlockwise from Cancer into Leo.

The displacement of the zodiac circle results from the use of a stereographic projection of the ecliptic plane using the North pole as the basis of the projection. This is commonly seen in astronomical clocks of the period.

The small golden star shows the position of the vernal equinox, and sidereal time can be read on the scale with golden Roman numerals. The zodiac is on the 365-tooth gear inside the machine. This gear is connected to the Sun gear and the Moon gear by a 24-tooth gear.

=== Old Czech time scale ===
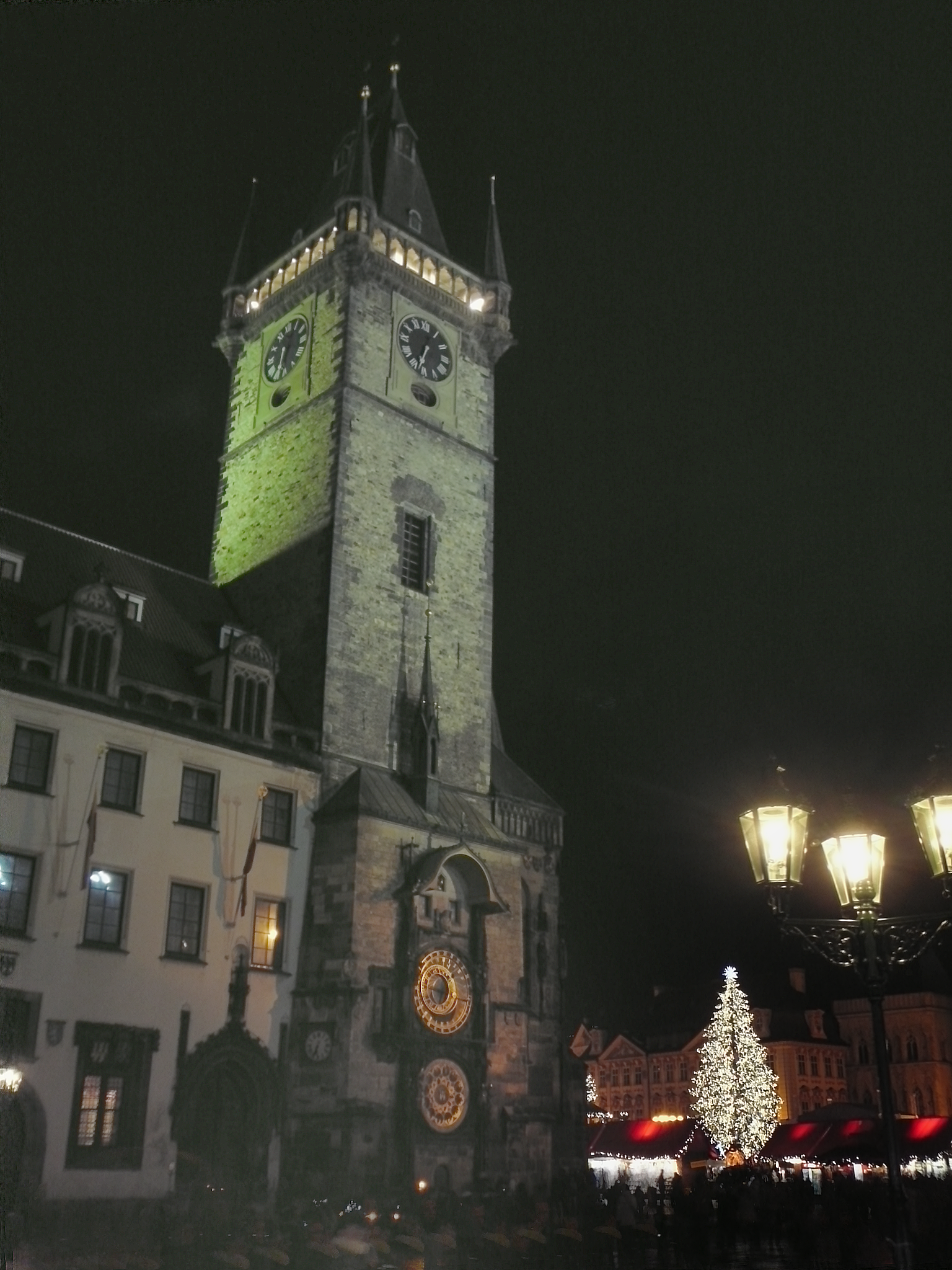
The clock tower on a Christmas night

At the outer edge of the clock, golden Schwabacher numerals are set on a black background. These numbers indicate Old Czech Time (or Italian hours), with 24 indicating the time of sunset, which varies during the year from as early as 16:00 in winter to 20:16 in summer. This ring moves back and forth during the year to coincide with the time of sunset. The outermost diameter of the ring is approximately 300cm (9.8ft).

=== Sun ===
The golden Sun moves around the zodiacal circle, thus showing its position on the ecliptic. The Sun is attached to an arm with a golden hand, and together they show the time in three different ways:

1. The position of the golden hand over the Roman numerals on the background indicates the time in local Prague time.
2. The position of the Sun over the curved golden lines indicates the time in unequal hours.
3. The position of the golden hand over the outer ring indicates the hours passed after sunset in Old Czech Time.

Additionally, the distance of the Sun from the center of the dial shows the time of sunrise and sunset. The Sun and its hand are on the 366-tooth gear inside the machine.

=== Moon ===
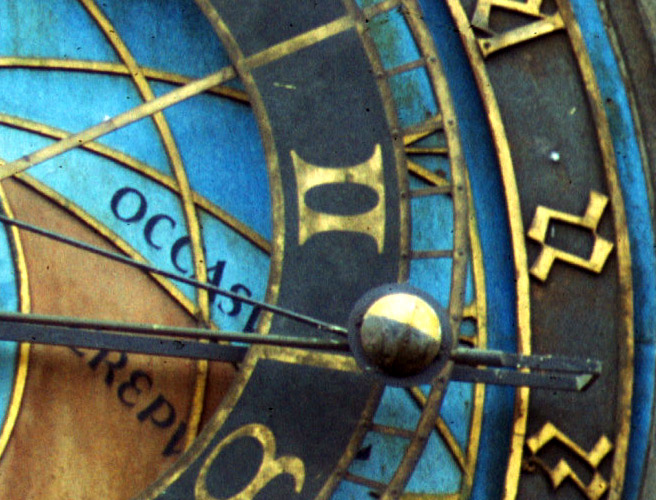
The Moon sphere is seen showing approximately a quarter moon

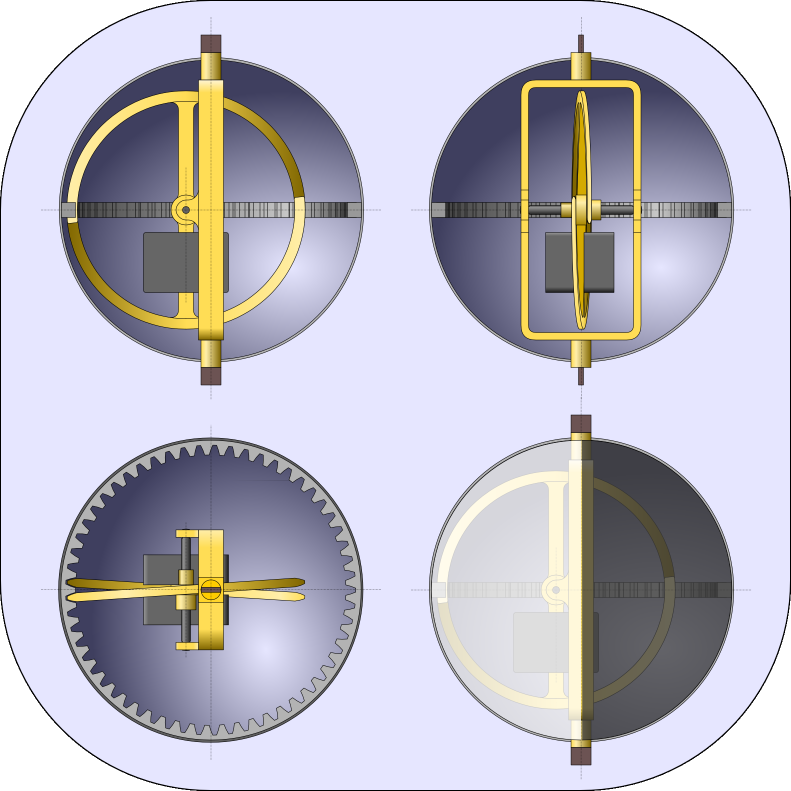
The unique mechanism inside the Moon

The movement of the Moon on the ecliptic is shown similarly to that of the Sun, although the speed is much faster, due to the Moon's orbit around the Earth. The Moon's arm is on the 379-tooth gear inside the clock machine.

The half-silvered, half-black sphere of the Moon also shows the lunar phase. The Moon has a 57-tooth gear inside its sphere, and is slowly rotated by a screw-thread attached to a weight, advancing two teeth per day. This movement, powered only by gravity, makes the Orloj unique in the world among astronomical clocks showing the phases of the Moon. The mechanism was created by an unknown maker, probably in the mid-17th century. Unlike the original device, the construction of which was described in a report from 1570, this mechanism produces a much smaller deviation from the actual lunar phase of about one day in five years.

== Animated figures ==
Moving figures

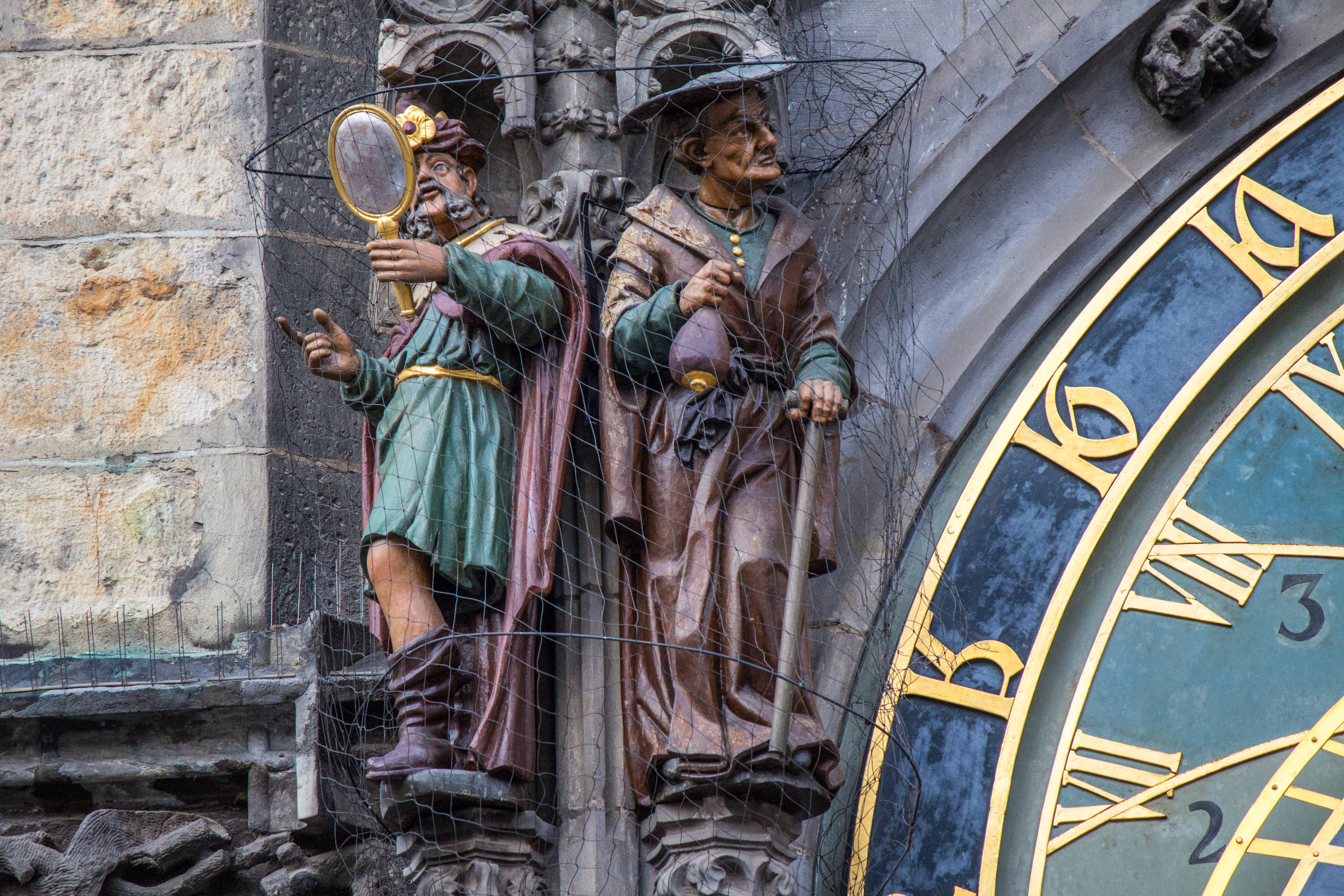

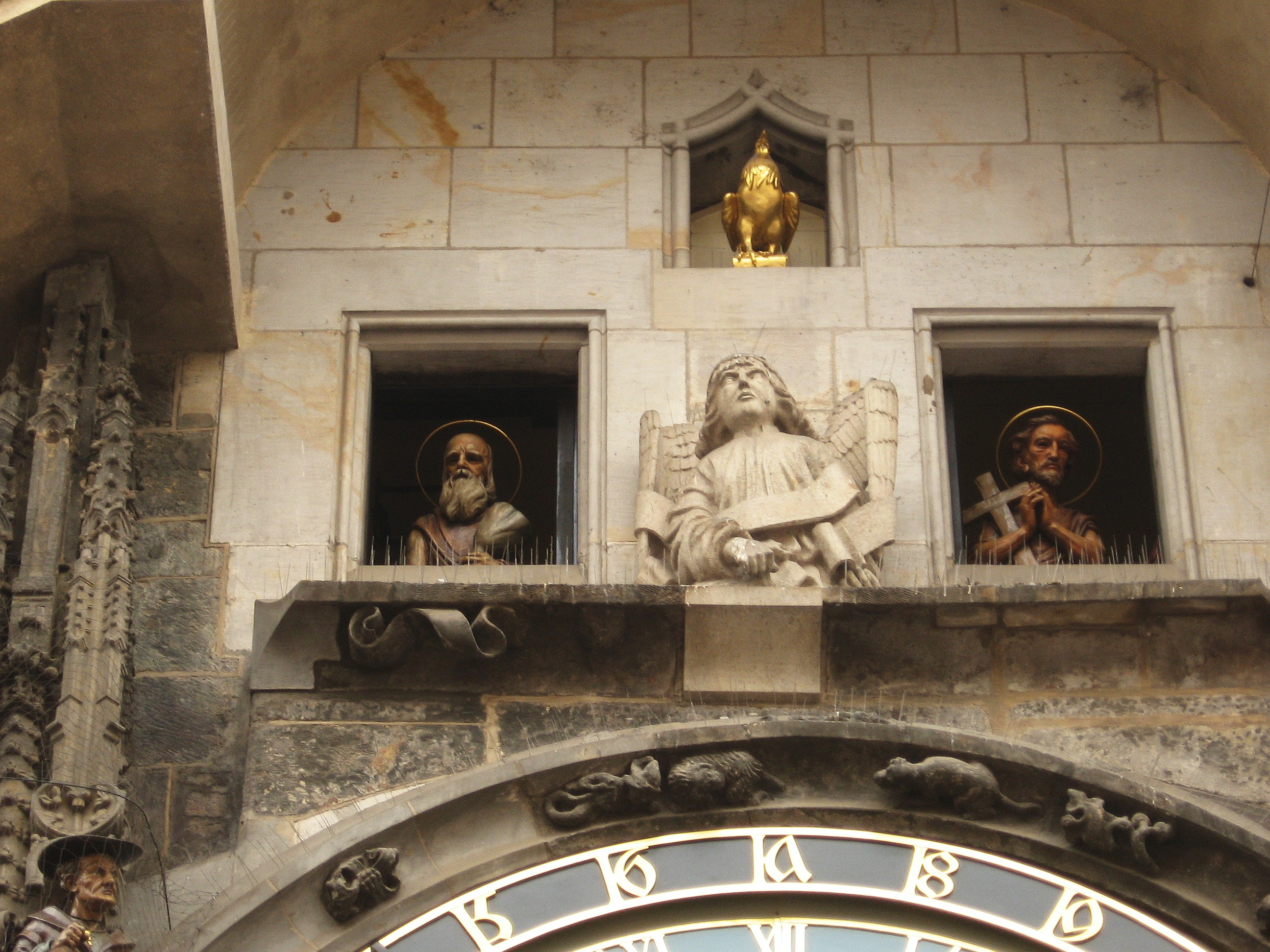

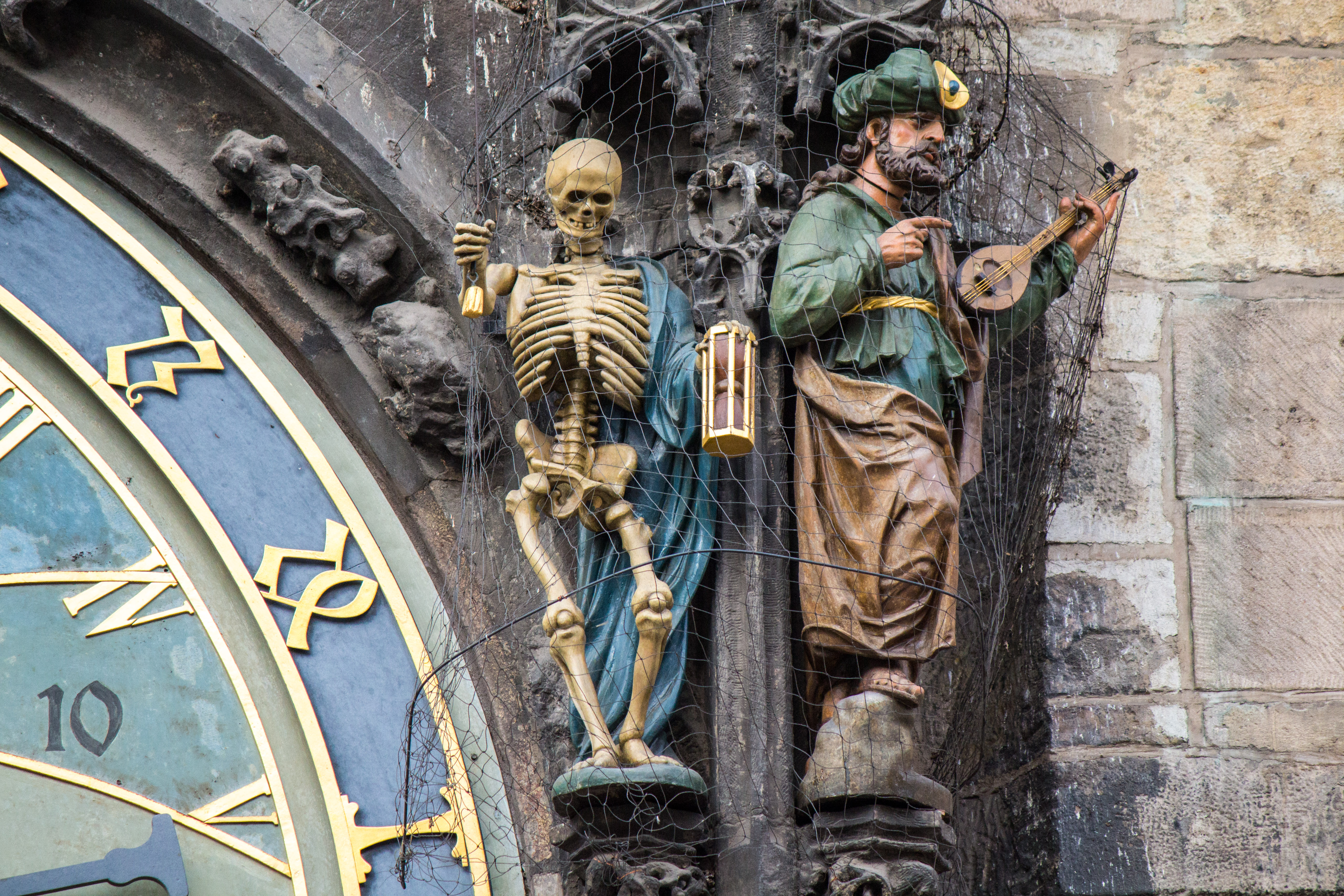

The four figures flanking the clock are set in motion on the hour, and represent four things that were despised at the time of the clock's making. From left to right in the photographs, the first is vanity, represented by a figure admiring himself in a mirror. Next, the miser holding a bag of gold represents greed or usury. Across the clock stands Death, a skeleton that strikes the time upon the hour. Finally, there is a Turkish figure representing lust and earthly pleasures. On the hour, the skeleton rings the bell and immediately all other figures shake their heads side to side, signifying their unreadiness "to go".

Every hour of the day, statues of the Twelve Apostles with their attributes appear at the doorways above the clock. The left and right windows above the astronomical clock slide aside to reveal the Apostles as viewed from the square in this order: James the Less and Peter, Andrew and Matthias, Thaddeus and Philip, Thomas and Paul, John and Simon, Barnabas and Bartholomew. Unlike the list of the Twelve Apostles mentioned in the canonical gospels, James the Great and Matthew are missing, replaced by Paul and Barnabas.

== Calendar ==
Calendar overview and detail

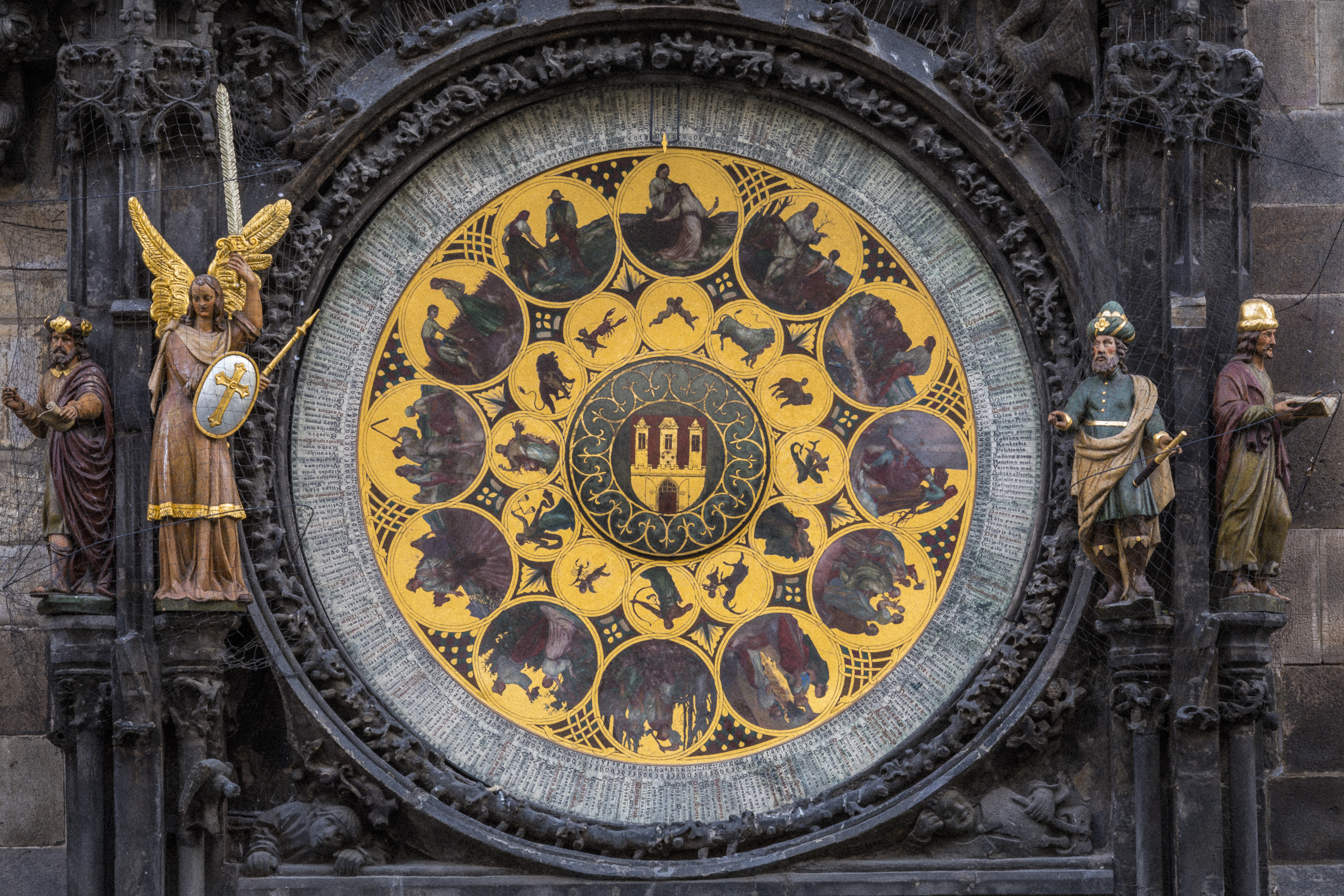

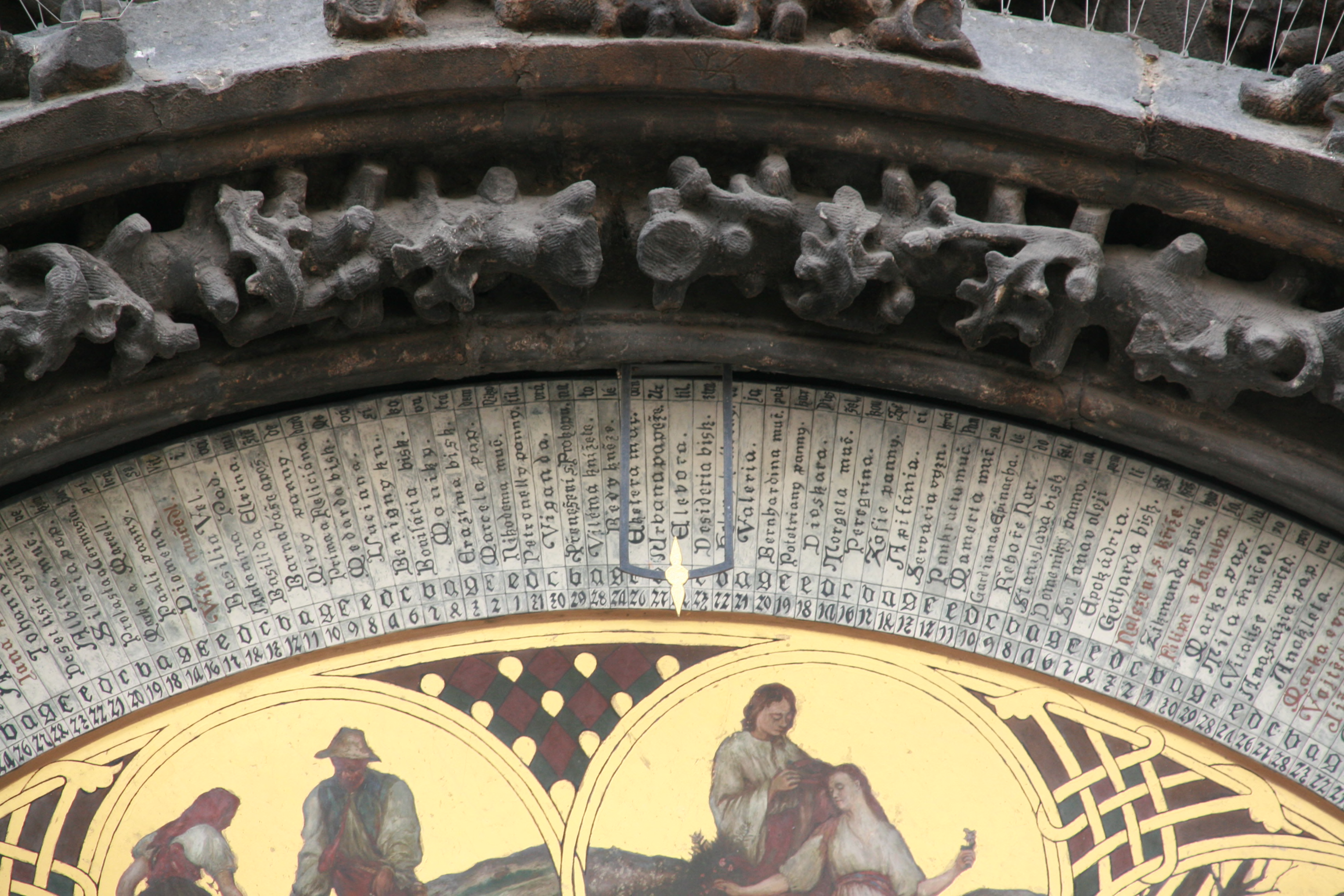

The calendar plate below the clock was replaced by a copy in 1880. The original made by Josef Mánes is stored in the Prague City Museum. On the edge of the circle is a church calendar with fixed holidays and the names of 365 saints. The board displays allegories of the months. Smaller images represent zodiac signs.

Next to the calendar stands a philosopher, archangel Michael pointing at the top of the dial, an astronomer and a chronicler.

== See also ==
- Antikythera mechanism – Ancient Greek analogue astronomical computer
- Armillary sphere – Model of objects in the sky consisting of a framework of rings
- Equation of time – Apparent solar time minus mean solar time
- Geocentric model – Superseded description of the Universe with Earth at the center
- Horology – Art or science of measuring time
- Orrery – Mechanical model of the Solar System
- Šindel sequence – Periodic sequence of integers whose partial sums are triangular numbers
- Torquetum – Medieval astronomical instrument

There is a replica of the clock in Mapo District, Seoul
