= Old Town (Prague) =

Medieval settlement of Prague, Czech Republic

Old Town of Prague Staré Město pražské
- Cadastral Area of Prague
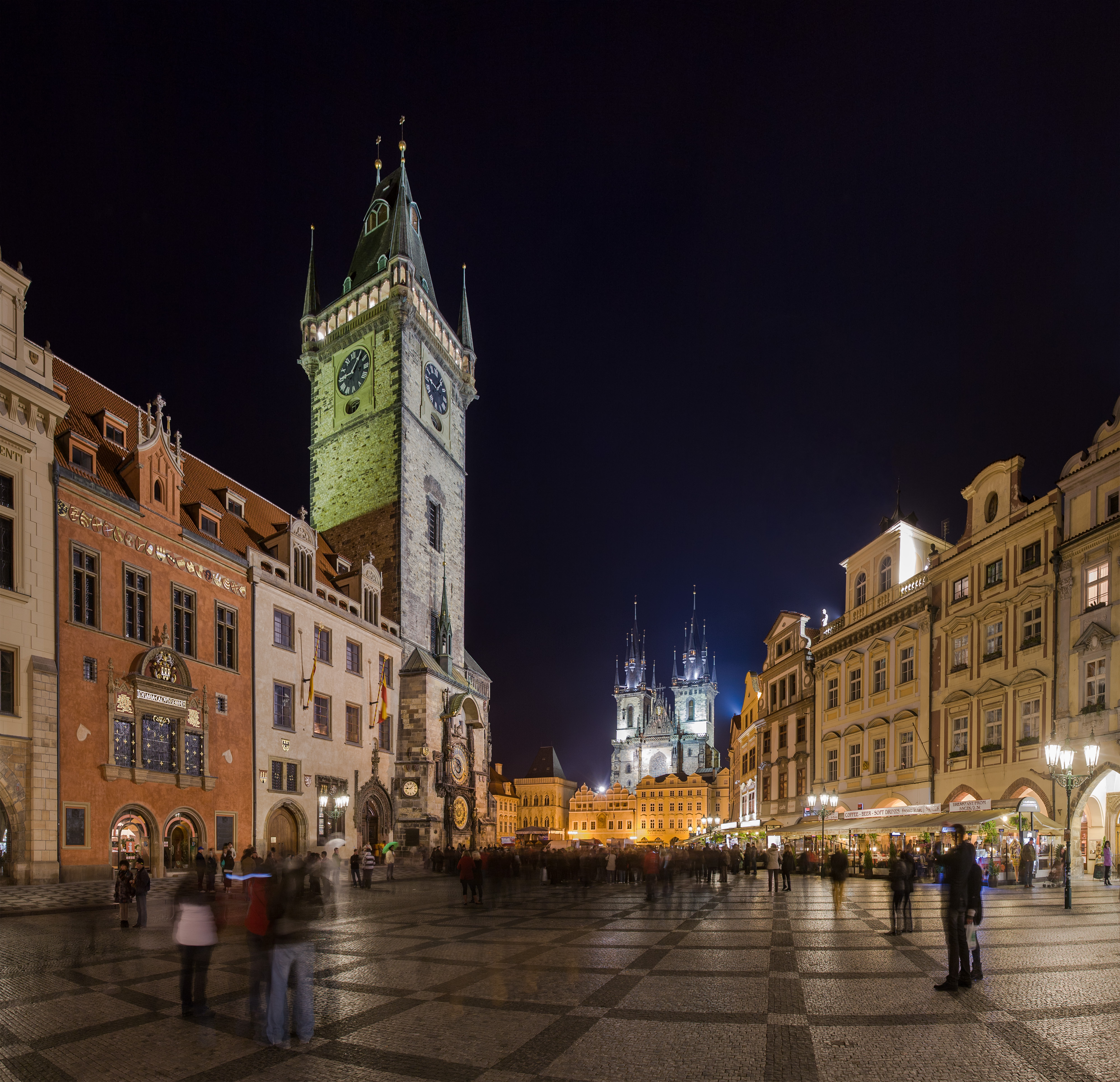
- Old Town Square

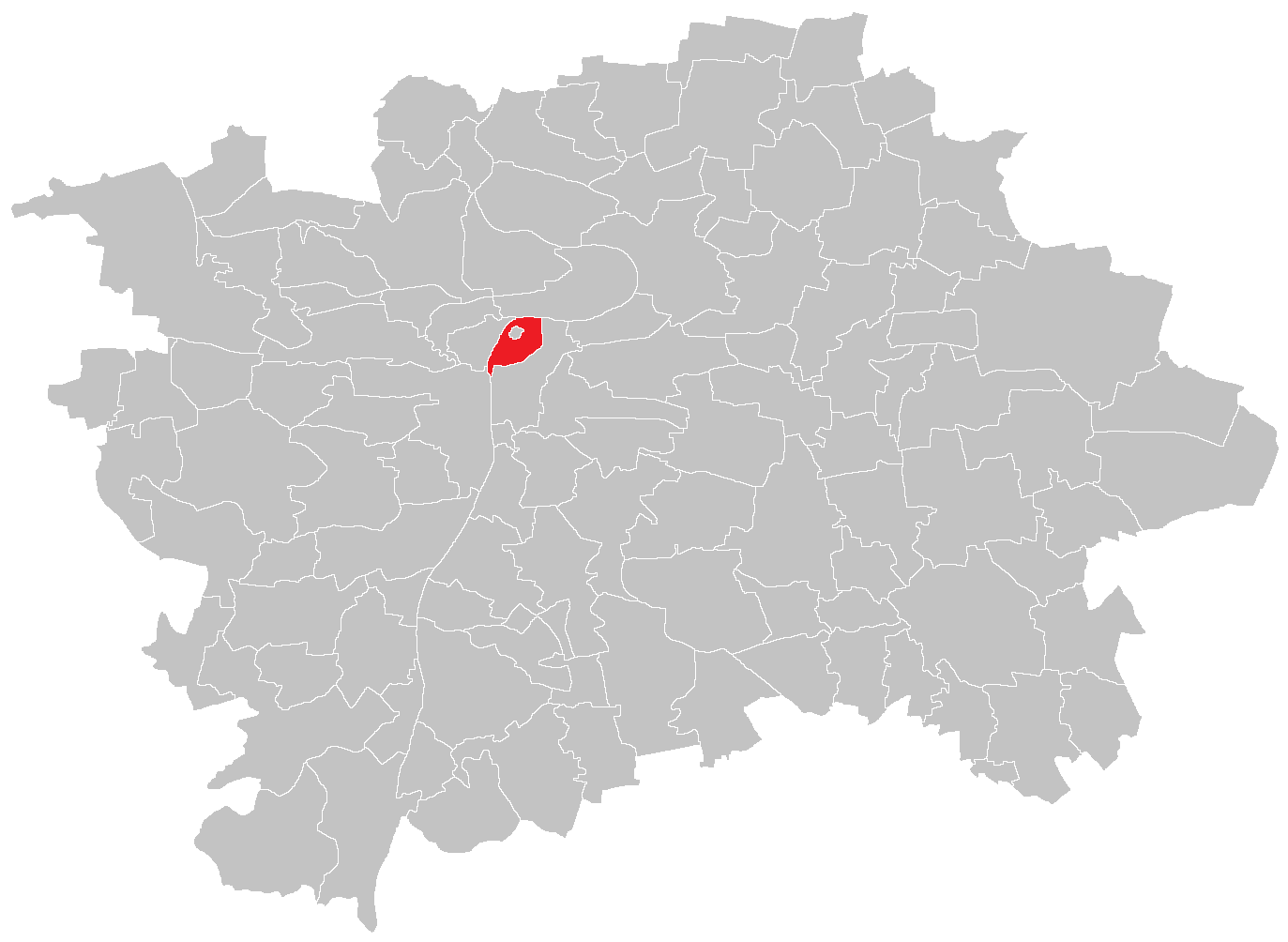
- Location of Old Town in Prague
- Coordinates: 50°05′15″N 14°25′14″E
- Country: Czech Republic
- Region: Prague
- District: Prague 1

Area
  - Total: 1.29 km^{2} (0.50 sq mi)

Population (2021)
  - Total: 6,272
  - Density: 4,860/km^{2} (12,600/sq mi)
- Time zone: UTC+1 (CET)
  - Summer (DST): UTC+2 (CEST)
- Postal code: 110 00

Old Town
UNESCO World Heritage Site
- Interactive map of Old Town
- Official name: Historic Centre of Prague
- Includes: Prague Castle, Old Town Square, astronomical clock, Charles Bridge
- Reference: [https://whc.unesco.org/en/list/616 616 616]
- Inscription: 1992 (16th Session)
- Area: 1,106.36 ha (2,733.9 acres)

The Old Town of Prague (Czech: Staré Město pražské, German: Prager Altstadt) is a medieval settlement of Prague, Czech Republic. It was separated from the outside by a semi-circular moat and wall, connected to the Vltava river at both of its ends. The moat is now covered up by the streets (from north to south-west) Revoluční, Na Příkopě, and Národní — which remain the official boundary of the cadastral community of Old Town. It is now part of Prague 1.

Notable places in the Old Town include Old Town Square and Astronomical Clock. The Old Town is surrounded by the New Town of Prague. Across the river Vltava connected by the Charles Bridge is the Lesser Town of Prague (Czech: Malá Strana). The former Jewish Town (Josefov) is located in the northwest corner of Old Town heading towards the Vltava.

== History ==
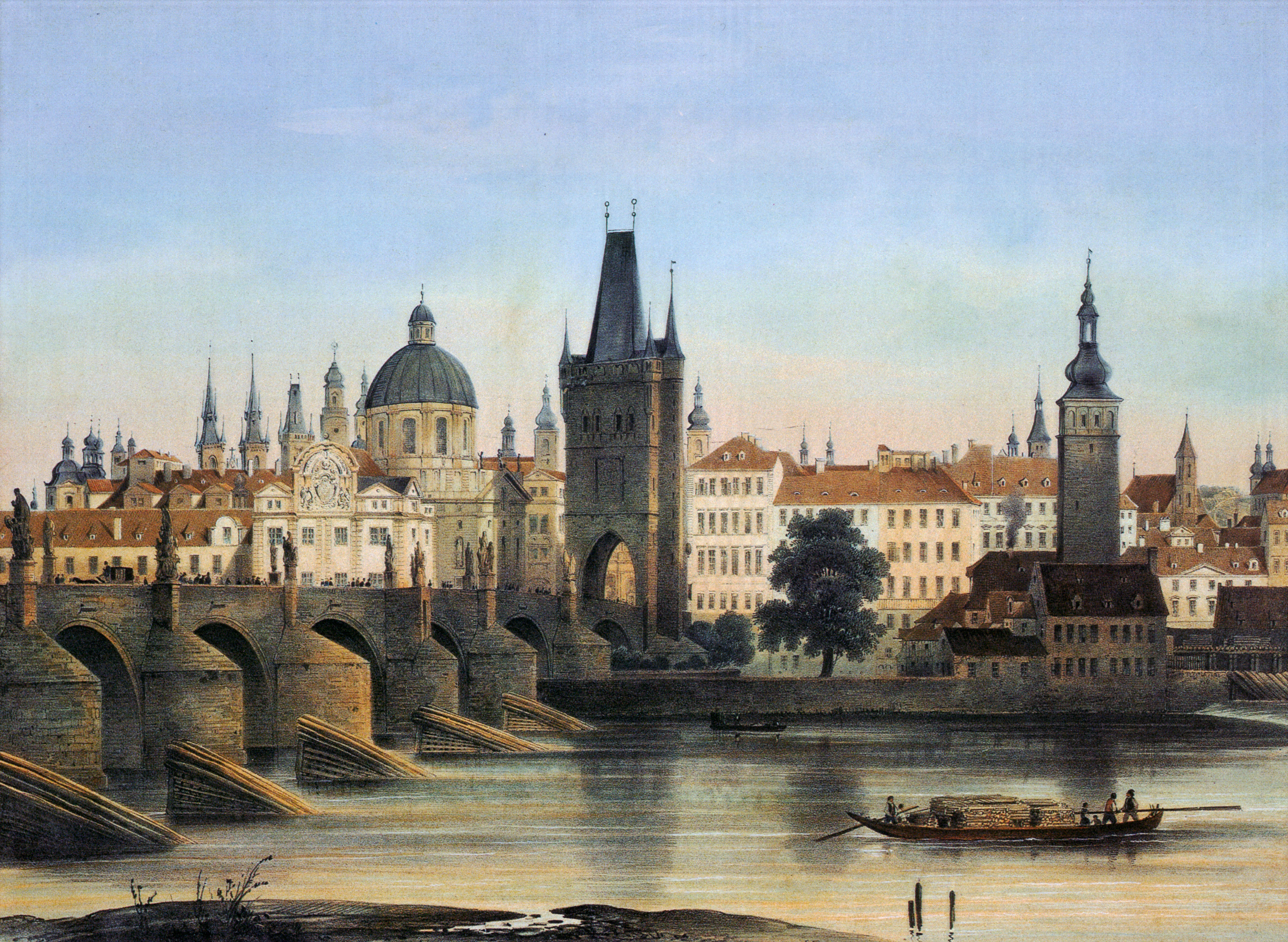
Old Town with Charles Bridge in 1840

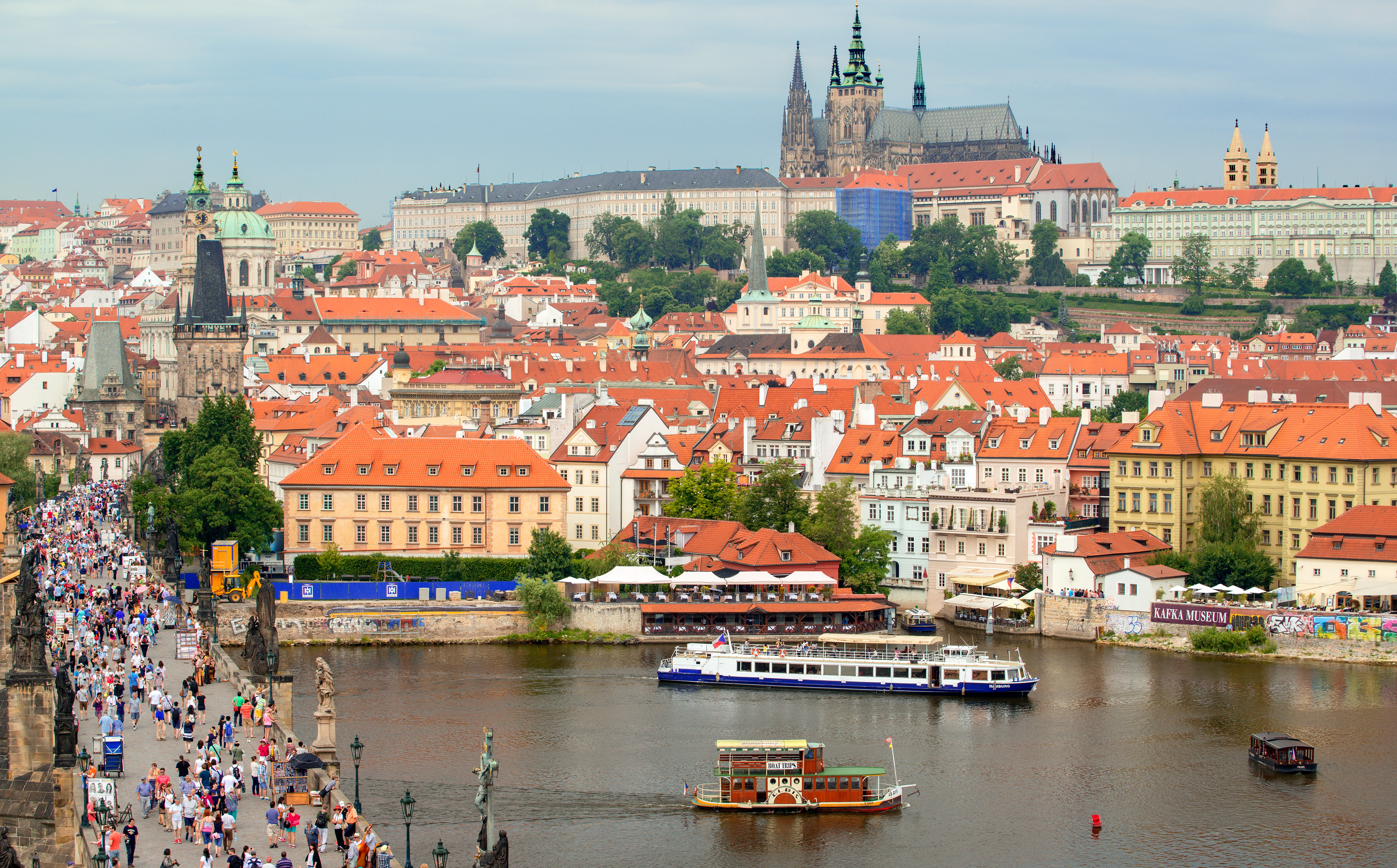
Charles Bridge connects Old Town with Lesser Town

Gallus Market (Havelské tržiště), by Vojtěch Bartoněk

From its early existence, around the 9th century, Staré Město was laid out of settlements which appeared from the spacious marketplace on the bank of Vltava. Records dating back to 1100 AD indicate that every Saturday a market was held on the marketplace, and large military gatherings also took place there. Thanks to trade the merchants of the area became rich, and when King Wenceslaus I of Bohemia gave them the privileges of township, the Town of Prague (Město pražské) was formed. According to ancient records, the city had around 13 gates, and a huge moat, providing strong defenses.

In 1338, the councilors of the Old Town of Prague were granted a permission by John of Luxembourg, King of Bohemia, to buy a magnificent patrician house from the family Volfin od Kamene (German: Wolfin von Stein) and rebuild it into their town hall – the still existing Old Town Hall. In the mid-14th century the importance of the Old Town of Prague increased rapidly. The city was prospering thanks to the development of trade and craftsmanship and became one of the most important Central European metropoles. Its brilliance and fame still further increased when the Bohemian king Charles IV became the Roman Emperor in 1355. Quite suddenly the attention of all medieval Europe was turned towards Prague, the residence of the head of the Holy Roman Empire. The original town hall was extended by a mighty square stone tower, a symbol of the power and pride of the town council of the first city in the Kingdom and Empire. In 1364 when it was completed the tower was the highest in the city.

After the city was expanded in the 14th century by Charles IV with the founding of the New Town of Prague, the moat and wall were dismantled.

In 1348, the University of Prague was founded by Charles IV. Since the late 14th century, its main seat has been in Carolinum located in the Old Town of Prague. In 1357, Charles IV commenced building a new bridge over the Vltava river connecting the Old Town with the Lesser Town of Prague. In 1391, the Bethlehem Chapel was built in the Old Town for sermons in Czech. The chapel played an important role in the Bohemian Reformation and Hussite movement. In 1402–1413 the church reformer Jan Hus preached there.

In 1689, a great fire (called the French fire) damaged a big part of the Old Town, including the Jewish Town. In 1784, the four towns of Prague were united into the Royal Capital City of Prague with a common administration.

== Demographics ==
Historical population

Year	Pop.	±%
1869	46,060	—
1880	44,027	−4.4%
1890	42,332	−3.8%
1900	37,888	−10.5%
1910	35,504	−6.3%

Year	Pop.	±%
1921	35,503	−0.0%
1930	30,481	−14.1%
1950	24,516	−19.6%
1961	24,718	+0.8%
1970	20,592	−16.7%

Year	Pop.	±%
1980	15,888	−22.8%
1991	13,040	−17.9%
2001	10,531	−19.2%
2011	8,705	−17.3%
2021	6,272	−27.9%

Source: Censuses

== Gallery ==
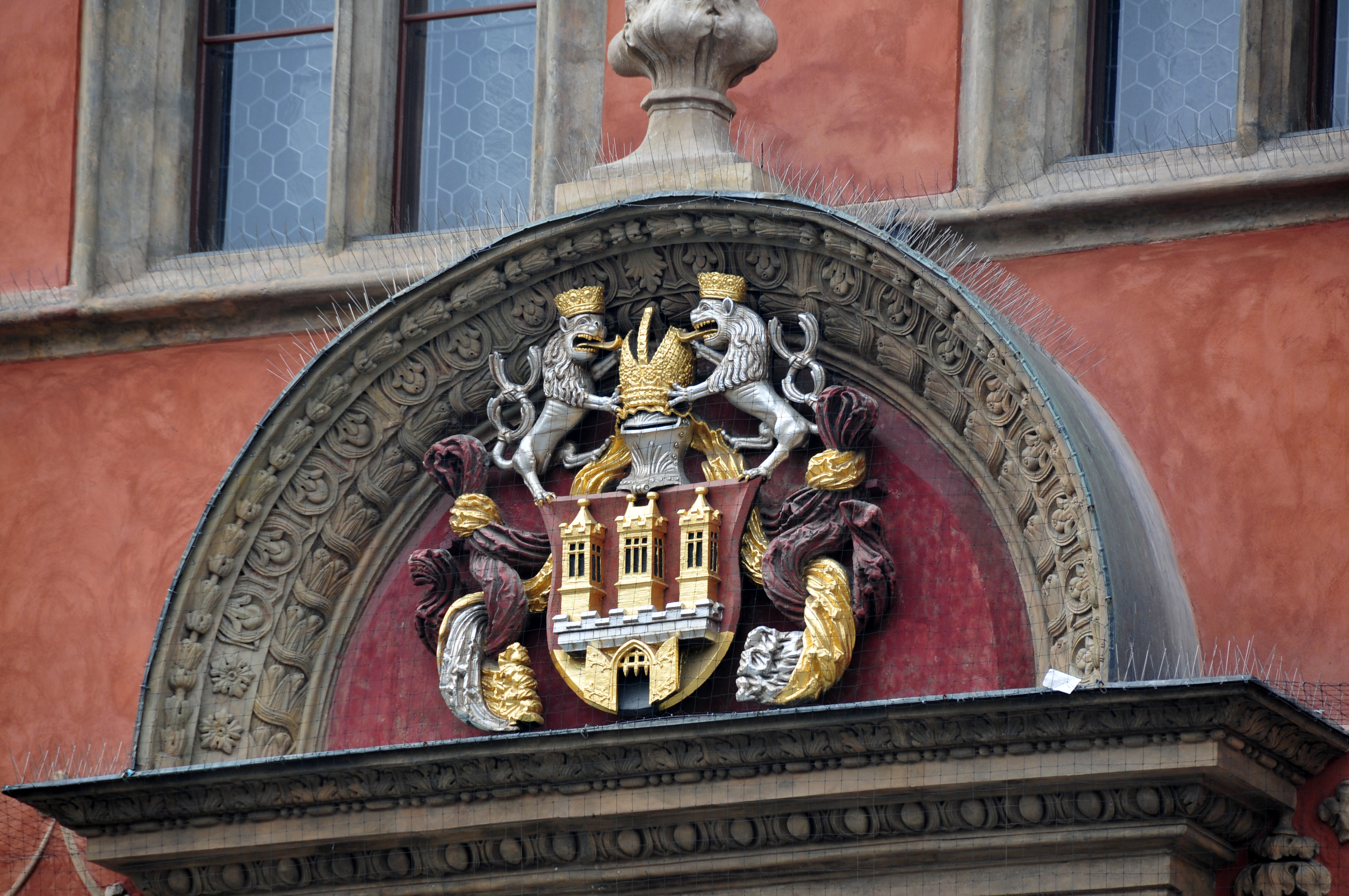
Coat of arms of the Old Town of Prague at the Old Town Hall

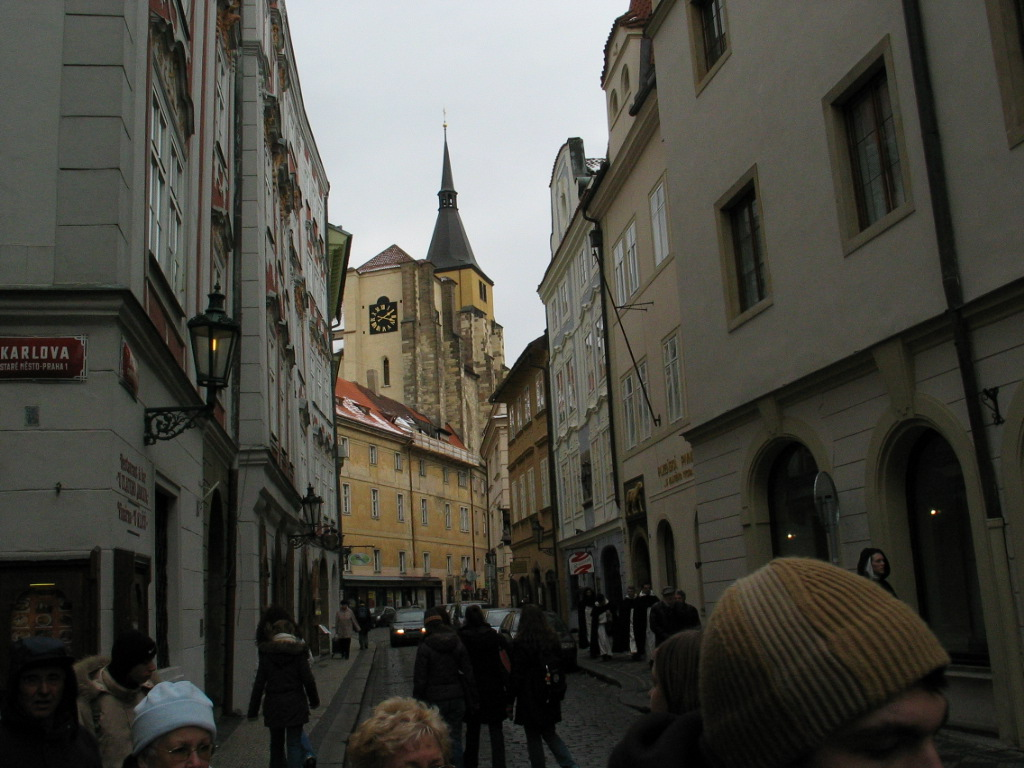
Narrow streets

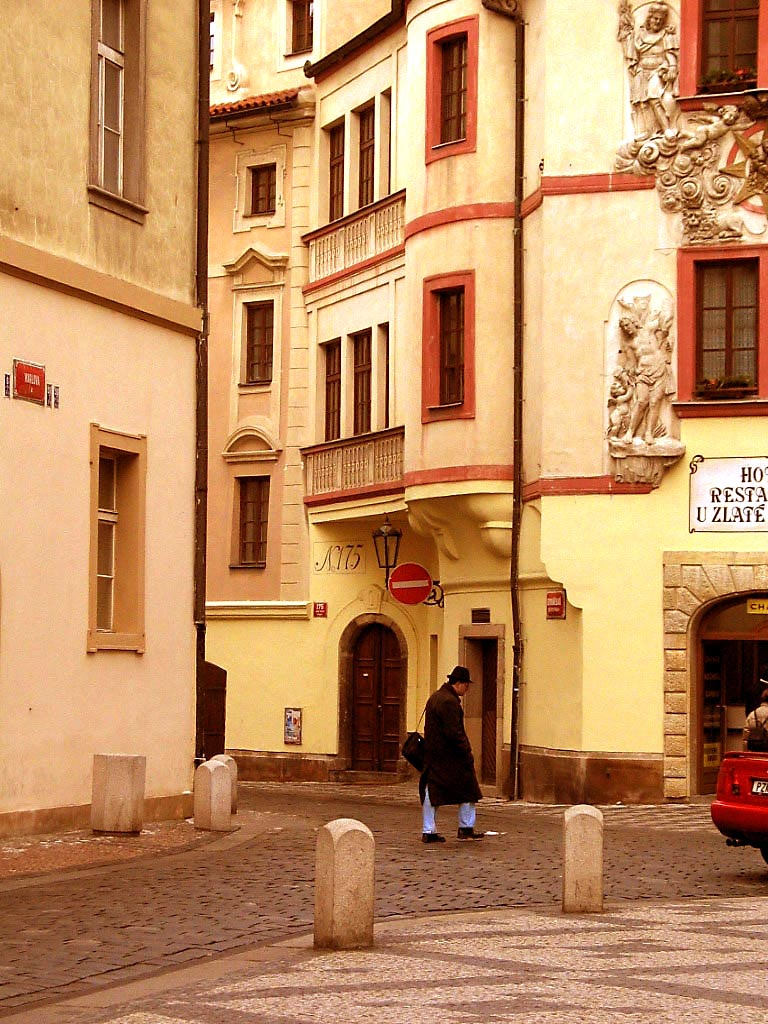
Houses in the Old Town

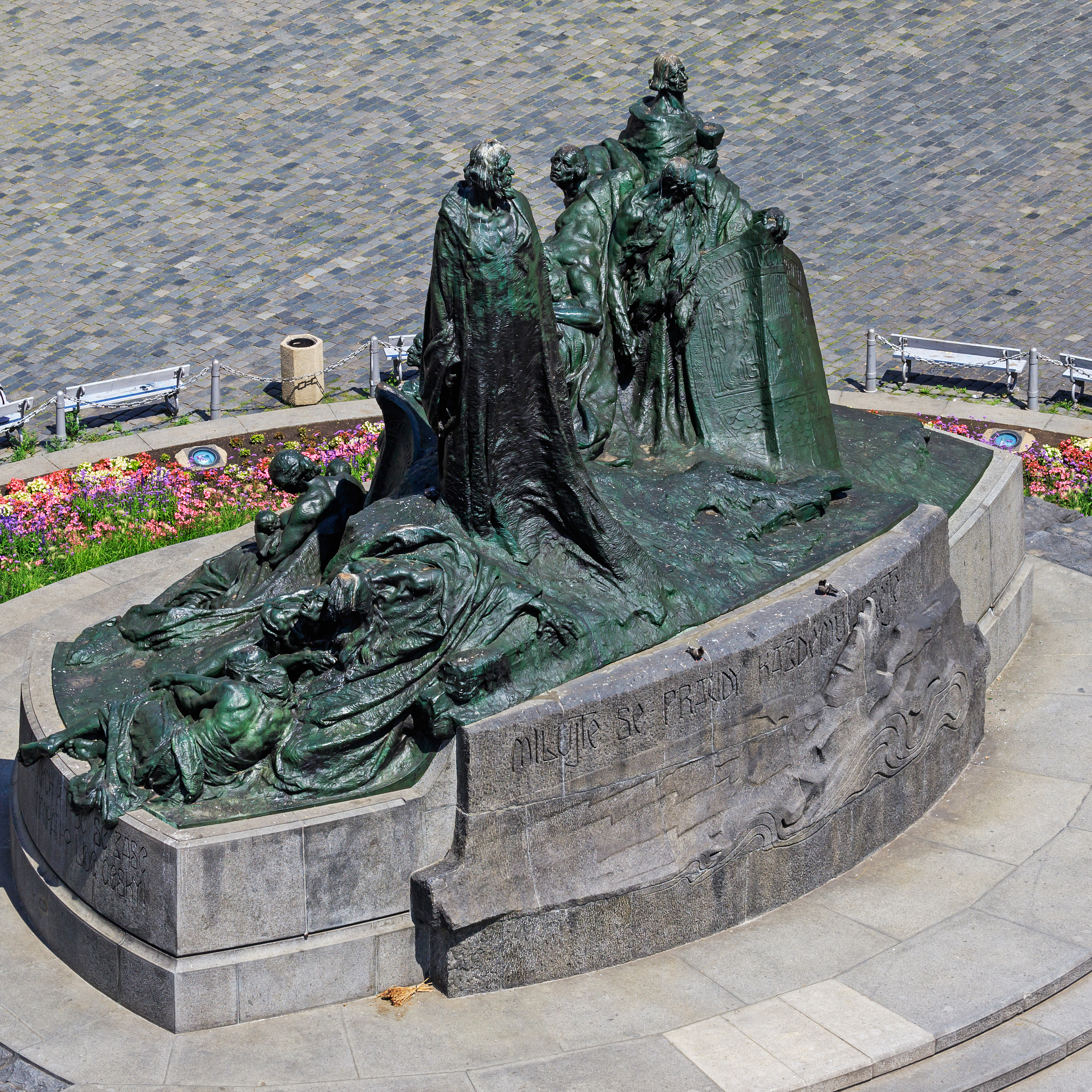
Jan Hus Monument on the Old Town Square

Egg market in the late 19th century, by Luděk Marold

== Connected articles ==
- Malé náměstí, a square in the old town
