= Malé náměstí =

Square in Prague, Czech Republic

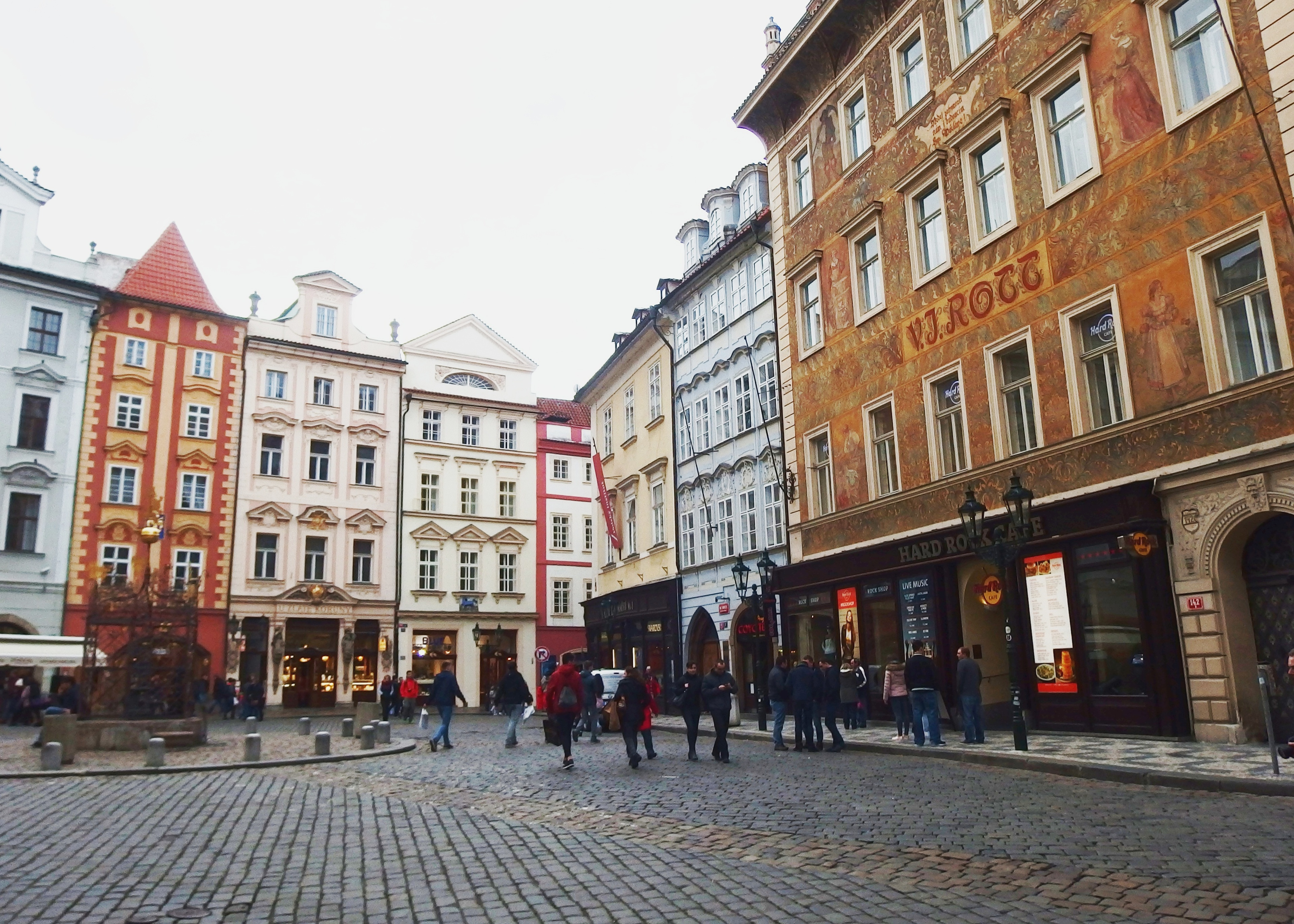
- Interactive map of Malé náměstí
- Location: Prague
- Nearest metro station: Staroměstská
- Coordinates: 50°5′12″N 14°25′10″E

Malé náměstí is a square in Old Town, Prague, in the Czech Republic.
