= Rail Safety Inspection Office =

Government agency in Czechia

- Drážní inspekce

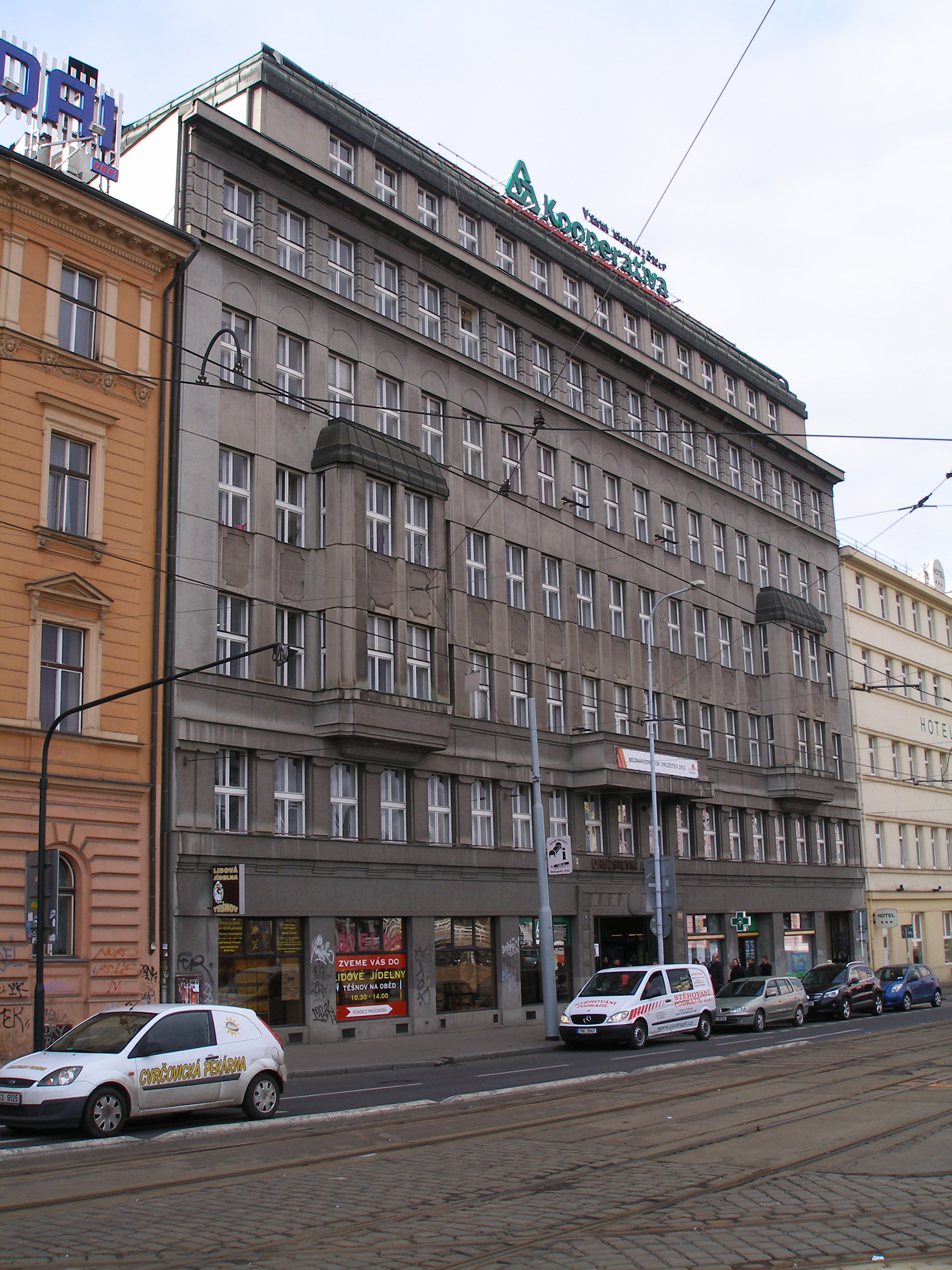
- House of the Cooperative Association where the head office of the Rail Safety Inspection Office is placed

Agency overview
- Formed: 1 January 2003
- Headquarters: Těšnov 1163/5, 100 00, Prague 1, Czech Republic
- Website: dicr.cz/en/

The Rail Safety Inspection Office (Czech: Drážní inspekce) is an agency of the government of the Czech Republic. It supervises the Czech rail system and investigates rail accidents and incidents.

The agency has its headquarters in 1st district, Prague. The agency has 38 employees in five offices, including those in Prague, Brno, České Budějovice, Ostrava, and Plzeň.

== History ==
In accordance with Act No. 77/2002, the agency was established in January 2003.
