= Šindel sequence =

Periodic sequence of integers whose partial sums are triangular numbers

In additive combinatorics, a Šindel sequence is a periodic sequence of integers with the property that its partial sums include all of the triangular numbers. For instance, the sequence that begins 1, 2, 3, 4, 3, 2 is a Šindel sequence, with the triangular partial sums

$$\begin{align}
1 &= 1, \\[2pt]
3 &= 1 + 2, \\[2pt]
6 &= 1 + 2 + 3, \\[2pt]
10 &= 1 + 2 + 3 + 4, \\[2pt]
15 &= 1 + 2 + 3 + 4 + 3 + 2, \\[2pt]
21 &= 1 + 2 + 3 + 4 + 3 + 2 + 1 + 2 + 3, \\[2pt]
28 &= 1 + 2 + 3 + 4 + 3 + 2 + 1 + 2 + 3 + 4 + 3, \\
& \ \ \vdots
\end{align}$$

Another way of describing such a sequence is that it can be partitioned into contiguous subsequences whose sums are the consecutive integers:

$$\begin{align}
1 &= 1, \\[2pt]
2 &= 2, \\[2pt]
3 &= 3, \\[2pt]
4 &= 4, \\[2pt]
5 &= 3 + 2, \\[2pt]
6 &= 1 + 2 + 3, \\[2pt]
7 &= 4 + 3, \\[2pt]
8 &= 2+ 1 + 2 + 3, \\[2pt]
9 &= 4 + 3 + 2, \\
& \ \ \vdots
\end{align}$$

This particular example is used in the gearing of the Prague astronomical clock, as part of a mechanism for chiming the clock's bells the correct number of times at each hour. The Šindel sequences are named after Jan Šindel, a Czech scientist in the 14th and 15th centuries whose calculations were used in the design of the Prague clock. The definition and name of these sequences were given by Michal Křížek, Alena Šolcová, and Lawrence Somer, in their work analyzing the mathematics of the Prague clock.

If $s$ denotes the sum of the numbers within a single period of a periodic sequence, and $s$ is odd, then only the triangular numbers $\tbinom{i}{2}$ up to $\tbinom{(s+1)/2}{2}$ need to be checked, to determine whether it is a Šindel sequence. If all of these triangular numbers are partial sums of the sequence, then all larger triangular numbers will be as well. For even values of $s$, a larger set of triangular numbers needs to be checked, up to $\tbinom{s}{2}$.

In the Prague clock, a modified countwheel mechanism is used to control the chiming of the hours. An auxiliary countwheel with slots spaced at intervals of 1, 2, 3, 4, 3, and 2 units (repeating in the example Šindel sequence in each of its rotations) is synchronized with and superimposed on another larger countwheel whose slots are spaced at intervals of 1, 2, 3, 4, 5, ..., 24 units, revolving once a day with its spacing controlling the number of chimes on each hour. The countwheels move with the same tangential speed, so that the slots on the larger wheel serve to select only the required (more accurately located) slots from the smaller wheel. In order to keep these two gears synchronized, it is important that, for every revolution of the large gear, the small gear also revolves an integer number of times. Mathematically, this means that the sum $s=15$ of the period of the Šindel sequence must evenly divide $\tbinom{25}{2}$, the sum of spacing intervals of the large gear. For this reason it is of interest to find Šindel sequences with a given period sum $s$. In connection with this problem, a primitive Šindel sequence, is a Šindel sequence no two of whose numbers can be replaced by their sum, forming a shorter Šindel sequence. For every $s$ there exists a unique primitive Šindel sequence having period sum equal to $s$. Note however, that this sequence may be formed by repeating a shorter Šindel sequence more than one time.

A sequence that just repeats the number 1, with any period, is a Šindel sequence, and is called the trivial Šindel sequence. If $s$ is a power of two, then the trivial Šindel sequence with period $s$ is primitive, and is the unique primitive Šindel sequence with period sum $s$. For any other choice of $s$, the unique primitive Šindel sequence with period sum $s$ is not trivial.

== See also ==
- Sparse ruler
