= Jan Šindel =

Czech astrologist, astronomer, doctor, mathematician and theologist

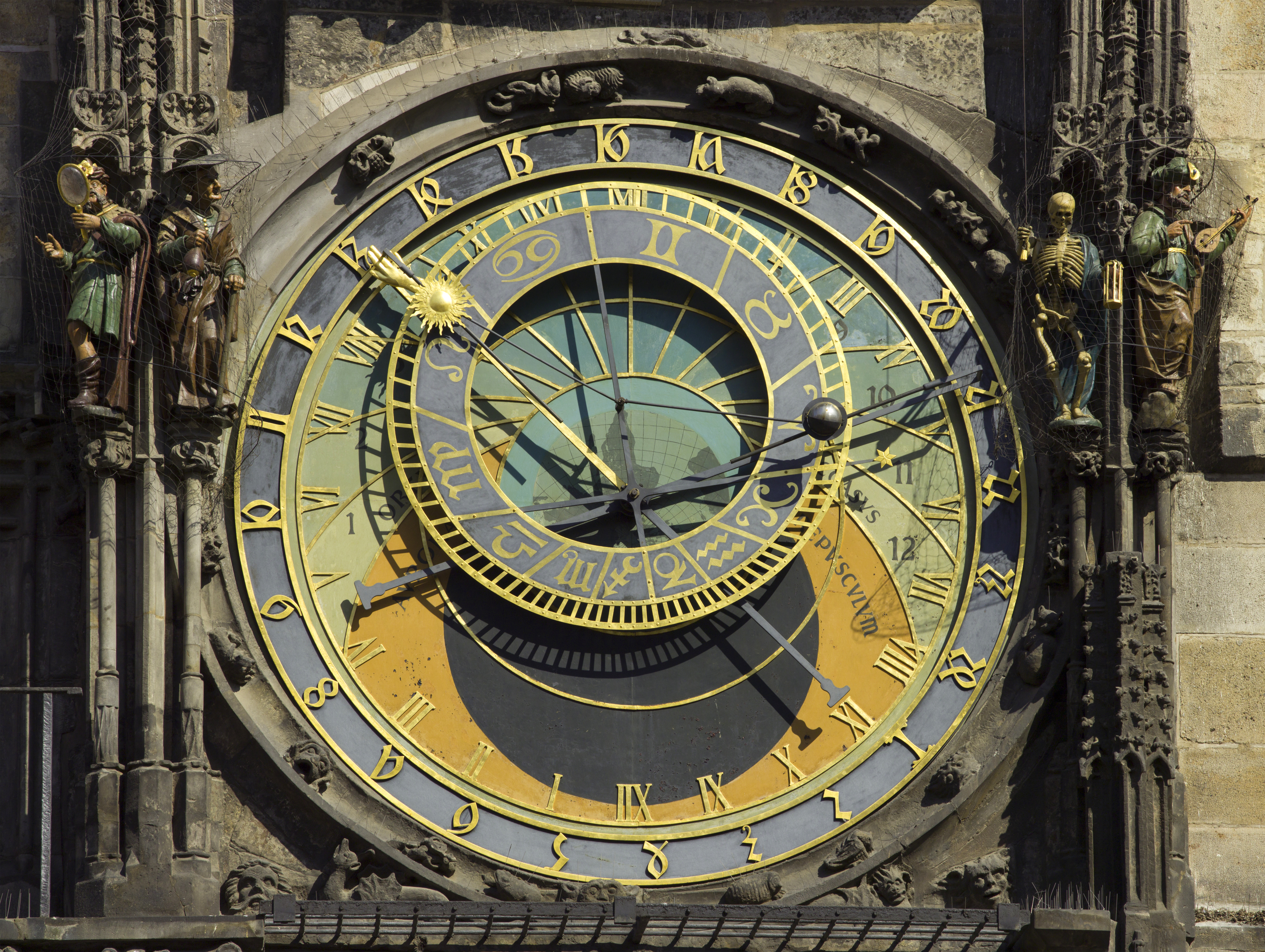
Dial of Prague Astronomical Clock made according to Jan Šindel's research in 1410.

Jan Šindel (1370s – between 1455 and 1457), also known as Jan Ondřejův (Latin: Iohannes Andreae dictus Schindel or Joannes de Praga), was a Czech medieval scientist and Catholic priest. He was a professor at Charles University in Prague and became the rector of the university in 1410. He lectured on mathematics and astronomy and was also a personal astrologer and physician of kings Wenceslaus IV of Bohemia and his brother Holy Roman Emperor Sigismund.

== Life ==
Jan Šindel was born in Hradec Králové probably in the 1370s. As a young man he came to Prague to study at Charles University. In 1395 or 1399, he became the Master of Arts at Prague University. In 1406, he worked at the parish school of the St. Nicolas Church in Malá Strana in Prague. Later he worked as a teacher of mathematics in Vienna, where he also studied medicine. Then he came back to Prague and became the professor of astronomy at Charles University, where he became Doctor of Medicine and rector of the university in 1410.

At the beginning he was a supporter of John Hus but later he stayed Catholic. He avoided religious disputes and preferred science. In 1418 he became a canon of Prague St. Vitus Chapter. Because of the Hussite Wars he had to leave Prague and came to Olomouc. In 1423–1436 he worked in Nuremberg as a physician. In 1432, he became the personal physician of the Emperor Sigismund. In 1441 he became the dean of the Vyšehrad Chapter in Prague. He had a good relationship with Enea Silvio Bartolomeo Piccolomini (later Pope Pius II), their correspondence from the years 1445–1447 has been preserved. He died probably between 1455 and 1457 in Prague.

== Legacy ==
Šindel's astronomical tables and maps were allegedly still used by Tycho Brahe. He had a special liking for astronomical devices. Based on his suggestion and calculations, Mikuláš of Kadaň constructed the Prague Orloj clock in 1410. The Šindel sequences in mathematics are named from the appearance of one of these sequences in this clock.

In 1982, an asteroid (3847 Šindel) was named after him.
