= Mikuláš of Kadaň =

Czech clockmaker

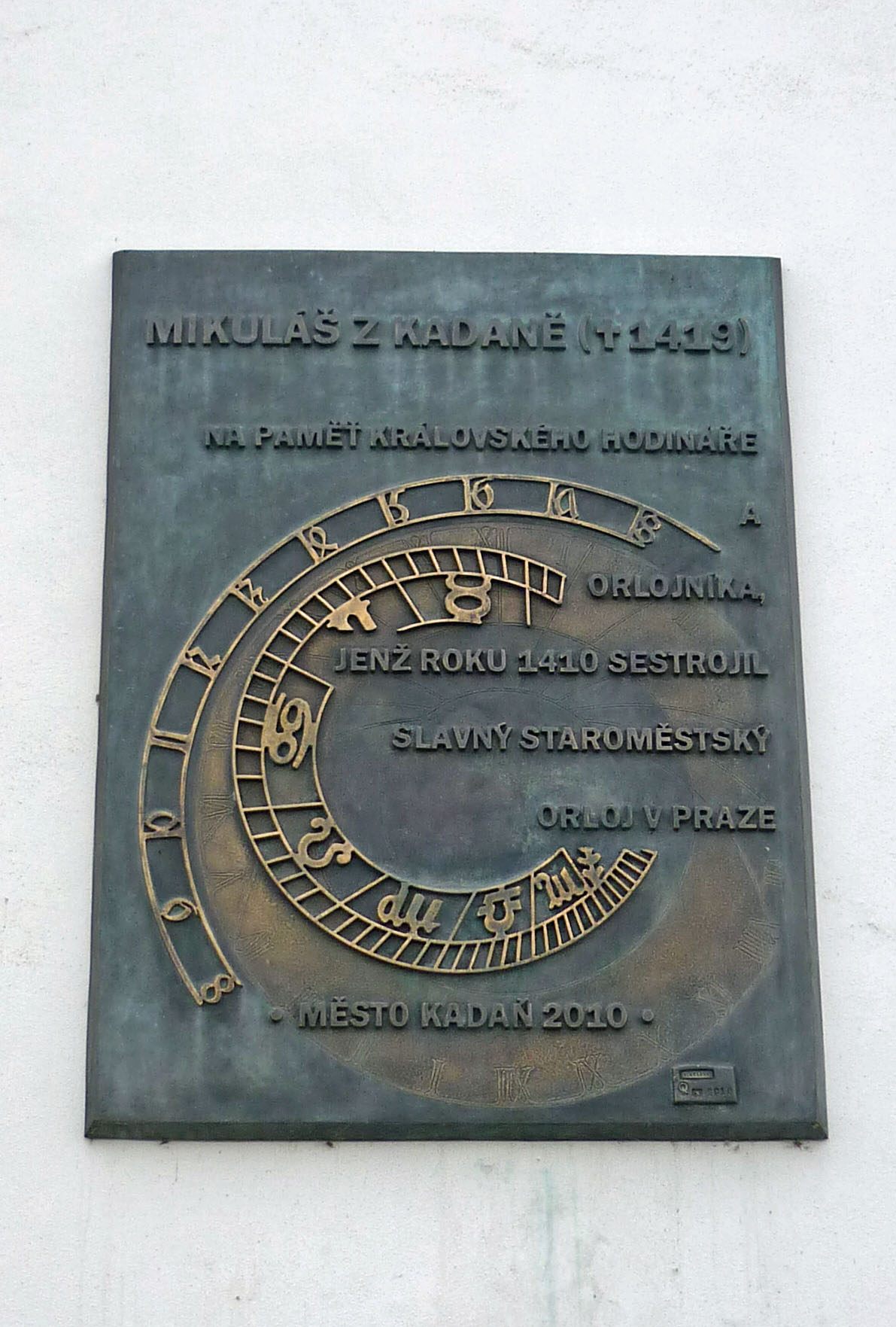

Mikuláš of Kadaň (Czech: Mikuláš z Kadaně) (born 1350, Kadaň – died 1419, Prague) was an Imperial clockmaker.

With Jan Šindel, Mikuláš designed the oldest part of the Orloj (which also known as Prague Astronomical Clock).

The clock was modified by Master Hanuš, who was mistakenly identified as the creator of the clock in a legend related by Alois Jirásek.

== See also ==
- Astronomical clock
