= Prague 1 =

Municipality in the Czech Republic

Prague 1 Praha 1
- Municipal District of Prague; Administrative District of Prague
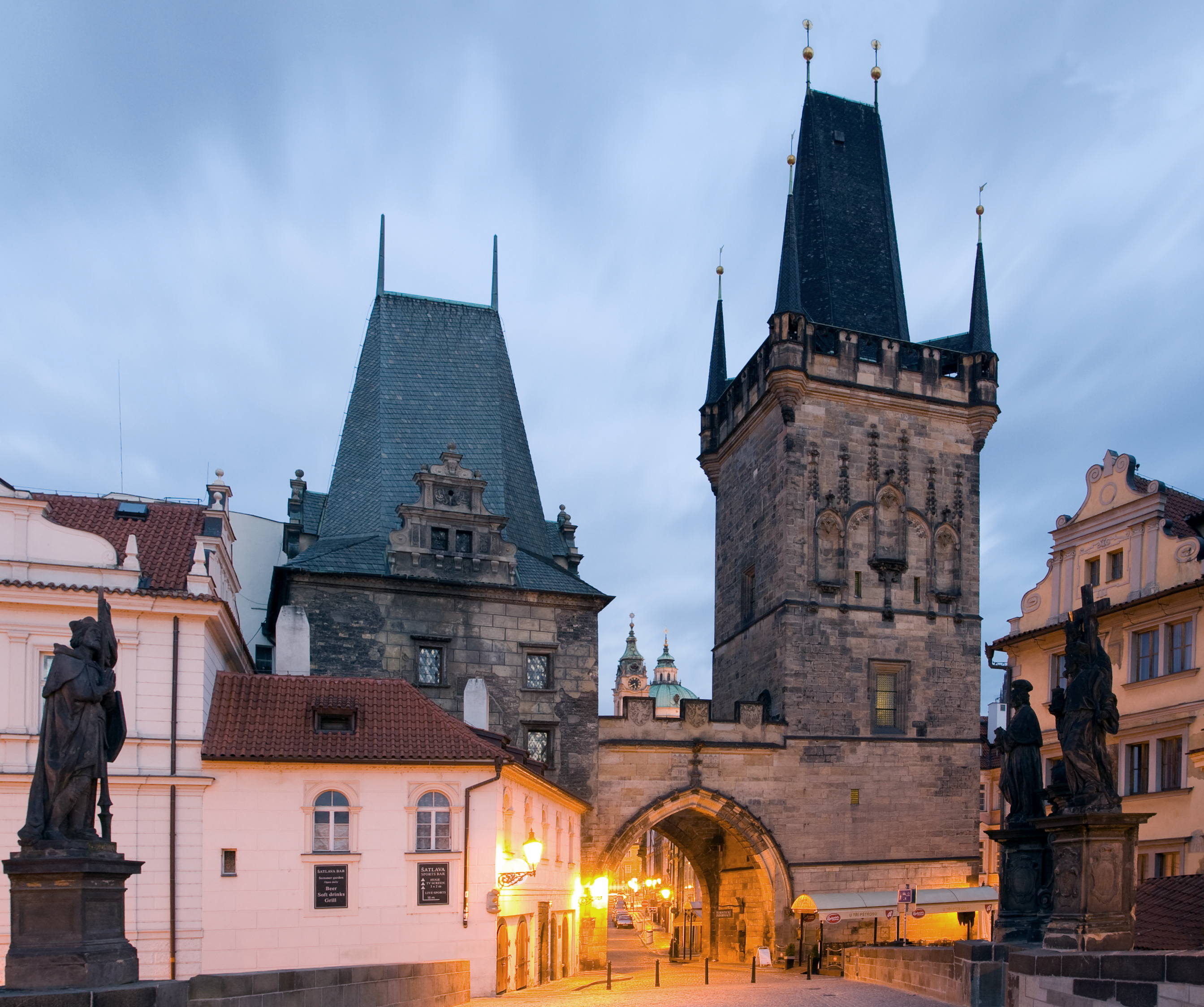
- Bridge Tower in Little Quarter

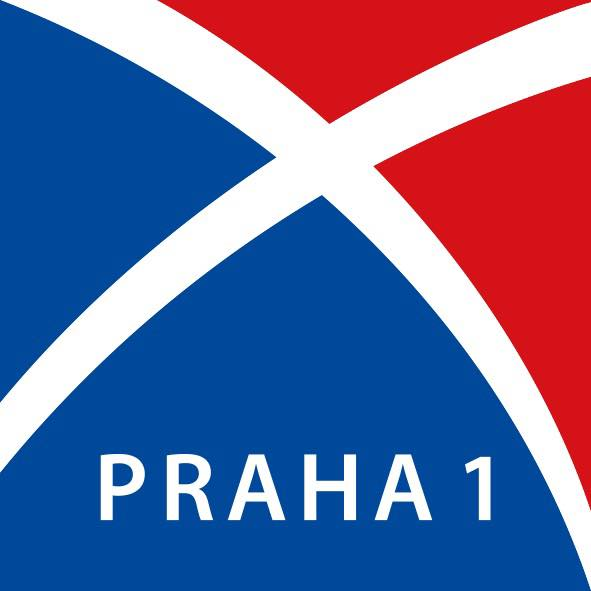
- Flag Coat of arms Logo

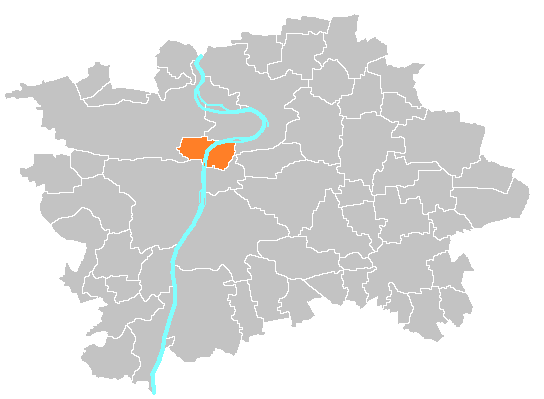
- Location of Prague 1 in Prague
- Coordinates: 50°05′11″N 14°24′40″E
- Country: Czech Republic
- Region: Prague

Government
  - Mayor: Terezie Radoměřská

Area
  - Total: 5.53 km^{2} (2.14 sq mi)

Population (2021)
  - Total: 22,967
  - Density: 4,150/km^{2} (10,800/sq mi)
- Time zone: UTC+1 (CET)
  - Summer (DST): UTC+2 (CEST)
- Postal code: 110 00
- Website: http://www.praha1.cz

Prague 1 (Czech: Praha 1), formally the Prague 1 Municipal District (Czech: Městská část Praha 1), is a second-tier municipality in Prague. It is co-extensive with the national administrative district (správní obvod) of the same name.

Prague 1 includes most of the medieval heart of the city. All of Staré Město (the Old Town) and Josefov (the Jewish Quarter) are in the district, as are most of Malá Strana (the Little Quarter), Hradčany and Nové Město (the New Town). Tiny parts of Holešovice and Vinohrady (the State Opera and new building of the National Museum) round out the district. The district has remained intact since its creation in 1960.

Most of Prague 1 is a UNESCO World Heritage Site. Almost all of Prague's major tourist sites, including Prague Castle, Old Town Square, the Charles Bridge and the above-mentioned Jewish Quarter, are in the district. The Parliament of the Czech Republic and the offices of the government are in Malá Strana, while the main building of Charles University is in Staré Město.

As of the end of 2004, 32,552 people lived in 18,821 homes in the district. The district covers 5.53 square kilometres (1,370 acres).

A Prague 1 address is considered quite prestigious, and real estate there is the most expensive in the city.

== Government ==
The Czech Ministry of Transport is in Prague 1.

The Rail Safety Inspection Office has its head office in Prague 1.

The Ministry of Foreign Affairs of the Czech Republic is headquartered in Czernin Palace in Prague 1.

The Ministry of Education, Youth and Sports of the Czech Republic head office is in Prague 1.

== Demographics ==
Historical population

Year	Pop.	±%
1869	84,436	—
1880	87,988	+4.2%
1890	86,898	−1.2%
1900	81,002	−6.8%
1910	69,834	−13.8%

Year	Pop.	±%
1921	73,085	+4.7%
1930	64,296	−12.0%
1950	50,141	−22.0%
1961	79,581	+58.7%
1970	66,079	−17.0%

Year	Pop.	±%
1980	52,719	−20.2%
1991	42,590	−19.2%
2001	34,581	−18.8%
2011	30,561	−11.6%
2021	22,967	−24.8%

Source: Censuses

== See also ==
- Old Town (Prague)
