= Jindřich Matyáš Thurn =

Czech nobleman (1567–1640)

Count Jindřich Matyáš of Thurn-Valsassina
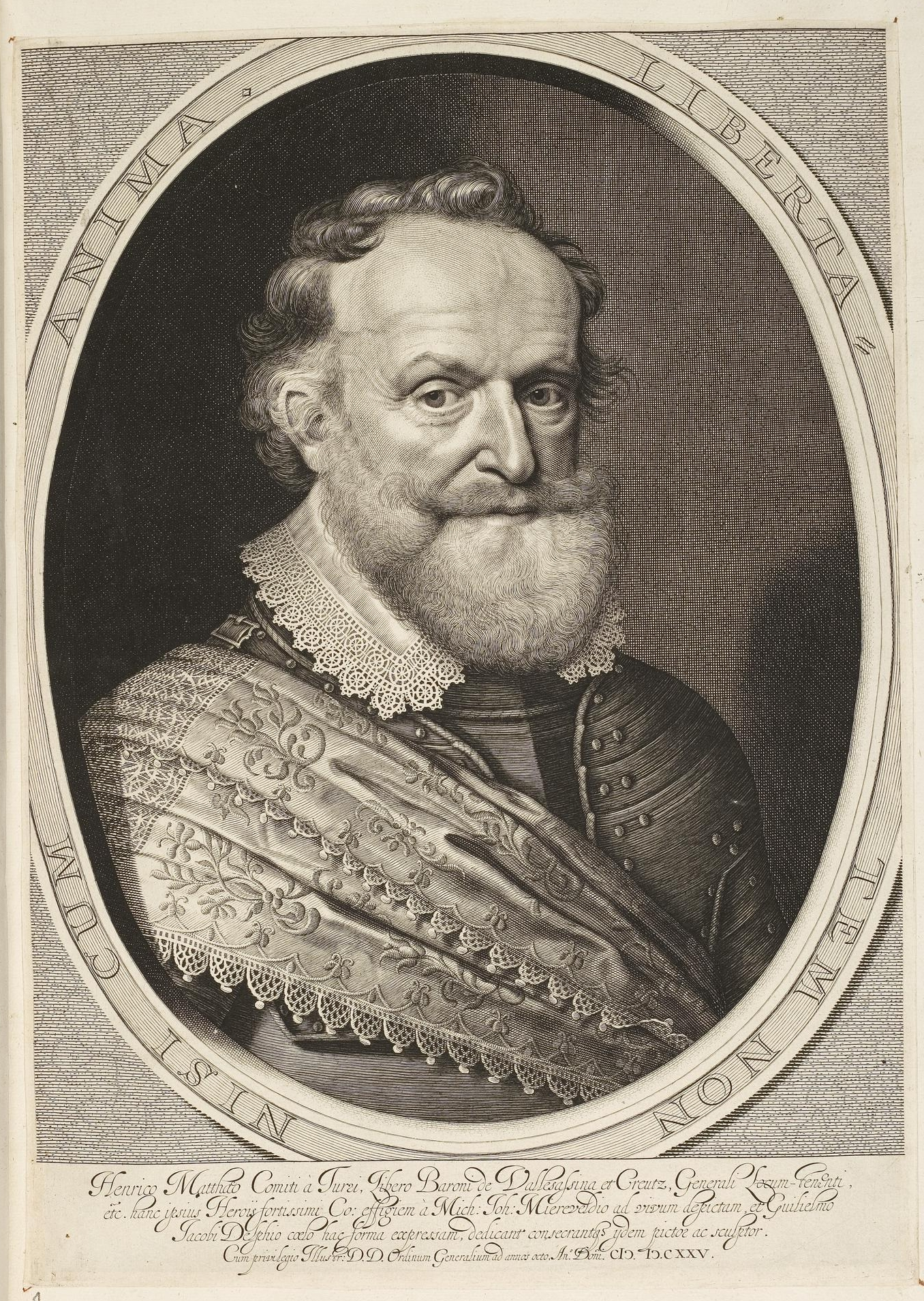
- Engraving by Willem Jacobsz. Delff (1625)
- Born: 24 February 1567; Innsbruck
- Died: 26 January 1640 (aged 72); Pärnu, Swedish Estonia
- Buried: St. Mary's Cathedral, Tallinn
- Noble family: Della Torre
- Issue: František Bernard (1592–1628)
- Father: Franz Napus von Thurn und Valsassina
- Mother: Countess Barbora of Schlick
- Military career
- Allegiance: Holy Roman Empire; Kingdom of Bohemia; Swedish Empire
- Branch: Imperial army; Bohemian estates' army; Swedish Army
- Rank: Lieutenant general
- Conflicts: Ottoman–Habsburg wars; Thirty Years' War; Bohemian Revolt; Battle of White Mountain

Count Jindřich Matyáš of Thurn-Valsassina (Swedish: Henrik Mattias von Thurn; German: Heinrich Matthias Graf von Thurn und Valsassina; Italian: Enrico Matteo Conte della Torre di Valsassina; 24 February 1567 – 26 January 1640), was one of the leaders of the Protestant Bohemian Revolt against Emperor Ferdinand II. He took part in events that led to the Thirty Years' War, and after the war, he became a military leader and diplomat in Swedish service, who eventually resided in Swedish Estonia.

== Early life ==
Jindřich Matyáš Thurn was born in Innsbruck in 1567. Shortly after, his family bought the Lipnice estate and moved there; then, in 1574, they moved to Moravia. He was the son of a member of the geheimrat of Ferdinand II, Archduke of Austria, Franz Napus von Thurn und Valsassina (František Thurn), count of Linz (1508–1586) and his second wife, Countess Barbora of Schlick (1547–1581), daughter of Count Hieronymus Schlick and countess Katharina von Gleichen-Tonna.

Both of his parents were Protestants. After his father's death, he was fostered by his Catholic uncle, John Ambrose.

== Career ==
Young Count Thurn served in the Imperial Habsburg embassy, and visited Istanbul, Syria, Egypt, and Jerusalem. From 1592, he served in the imperial army against Turks. In imperial service, Thurn rose to the ranks of colonel and War Councillor. By marriage, he came into remarkable landholdings in Croatian Krajina, among other places. The Emperor granted him the burgraviate of Karlštejn Castle in central Bohemia as a reward for his accomplishments in the battles against the Turks in Hungary. In northeast Bohemia, he purchased in 1605 the lordship of Veliš manor (near town Jičín), which brought him to the membership of the Bohemian estate of nobles (páni, "lords"). Politically, Thurn joined the Protestants of Bohemia, where he served as marshal of the nobility.

In 1617, the devout Catholic Archduke Ferdinand of Styria was put forward as Habsburg successor to the aged, childless emperor Matthias, and also to be elected to the Bohemian throne. Bohemian nobles required him to uphold their freedom of religion, enshrined in the Decree (Letter of Majesty) of the late Emperor Rudolf II. Thurn was one of the signatories of the Bohemians' critical reply to Ferdinand.

=== Leader of the Bohemian Revolt ===
Despite his accession to the crown of Bohemia in 1617, Ferdinand was not willing to agree to the demands of the Bohemian nobility. Furthermore, their demands also failed to prevent Ferdinand's election as Holy Roman Emperor in 1619. What the nobles did achieve was that in 1618, in a stormy event at the Royal Castle of Prague, count Thurn was a key leader of that faction of the nobility who incited a crowd that defenestrated two of Ferdinand's representatives, Jaroslav Bořita of Martinice and Vilém Slavata of Chlum together with their scribe, Philip Fabricius.

Following the defenestration, Thurn was elected as one of the thirty Defenders of the Protestant Faith elected by the Estates of Bohemia. The revolt of the Protestant population of Bohemia began on 23 May 1618, and Thurn took command of the national army. His command was signified by a series of ineffective campaigns, faults in the campaign plan in some cases beyond his control, which frustrated imperial efforts to crush the revolt quickly. He participated in deposing Ferdinand of Bohemia from the throne and in the election of Frederick V, Elector Palatine as the new Bohemian king. Count Thurn was commander of a regiment at the inauspicious Battle of White Mountain in 1620. After the Bohemians' defeat there, Ferdinand exiled him, along with all the other Protestant nobility (including the leaders of the uprising) and townspeople. Consequently, Thurn lost his estates in Bohemia.

=== In exile ===
After being exiled, Thurn continued to take part in the fighting and political negotiations of the Thirty Years' War against the Habsburgs, acting in the roles of both diplomat and soldier.

In 1626, he took command of some troops in Silesia. Then he served as lieutenant general in the army of King Gustavus Adolphus of Sweden. His only son, Count František Bernard, who rose to the rank of colonel in Swedish service, fell ill during the Polish campaign and died in 1628.

== Death ==
On 11 October 1633, Thurn and his force of 8,000 soldiers were confronted by Wallenstein's army near Steinau an der Oder in Saxony, where he was captured. He was soon ransomed from captivity and retired to the family's new holdings in Pernau (Pärnau), Estonia. Count Thurn died there and was buried in the St. Mary's Cathedral of Tallinn.

His heir was his underage grandson, Count Heinrich von Thurn-Valsassina of Pärnu (1628–1656), son of František Bernard (1592–1628) and Magdalena von Thurn-Valsassina (born von Hardeck).

Count Thurn wrote a booklet in German, titled Defensionsschrift (English: Writing about Defenestration), the work justifying his role in the events of 1618 as a deliberate, conscious defence of his religious beliefs. The booklet was published in Sweden.
