= Filip Fabricius =

Czech Catholic officer

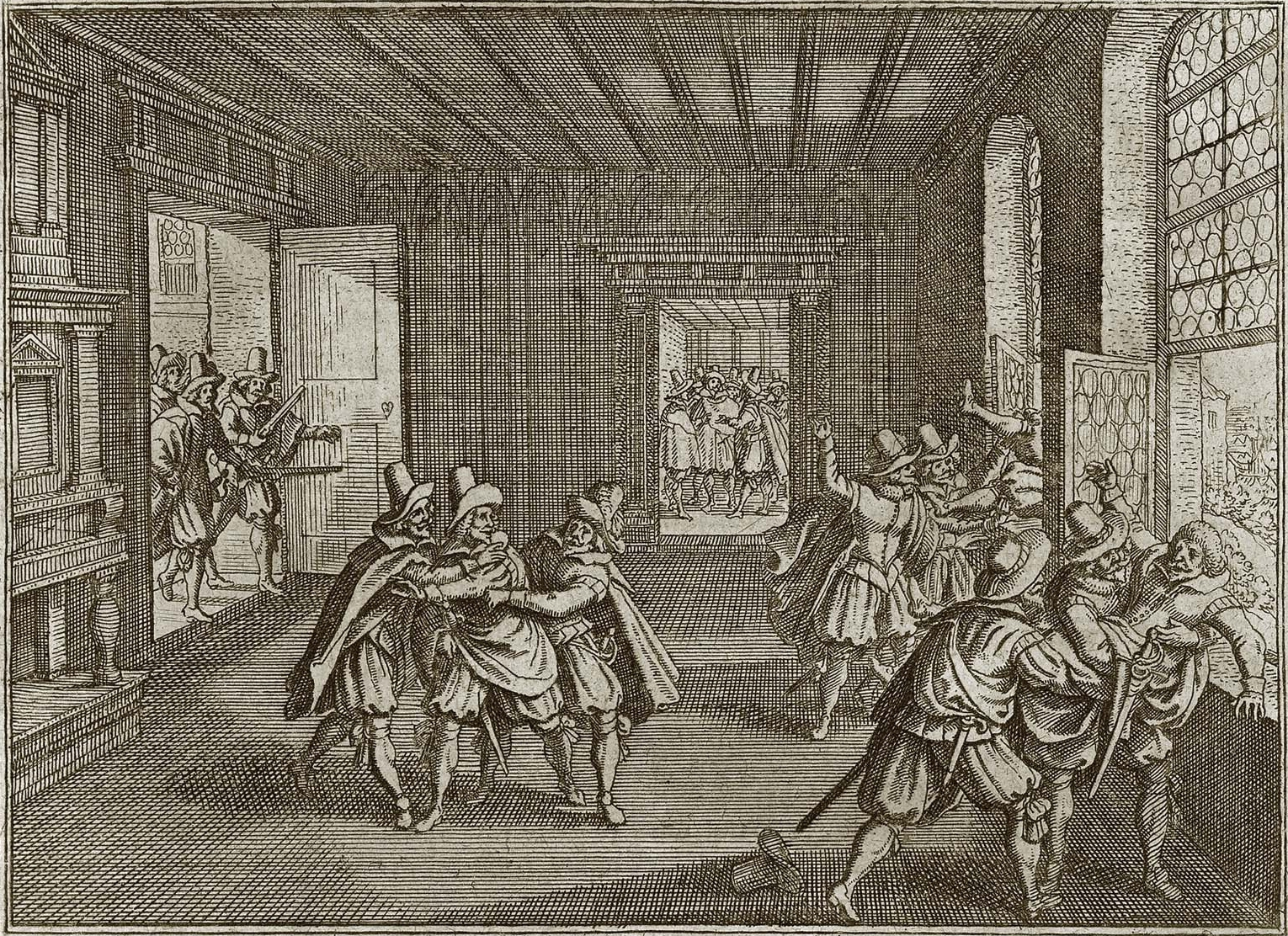
Prague Defenestration in 1618

Filip Fabricius, later of Rosenfeld and Hohenfall (c. 1570 – 18 October 1632) was a Czech Catholic officer best known for being thrown out of the Prague Castle window during the Third Defenestration of Prague with two Czech Catholic noblemen, Count Jaroslav Bořita of Martinice and Count Vilém Slavata of Chlum and Košumberk.

== Early life ==
Fabricius was born in c. 1570 in Mikulov, Moravia (Zikmund Winter incorrectly suggested Mohelnice). In later records Georg Fabricius, a German poet and humanist, was considered his grandfather. He studied at Prague Jesuit Academy (first mentioned there in 1586 as a rhetoric student) and became a Bachelor in 1588 and Master a year later. He wrote ceremonial speeches and interpreted.

In 1598, Fabricius got profitably married to Judita Podmanická, the only living descendant to a rich Prague trader. He became a citizen of the Old Town and there is a later record that he might have been a secretary to Adam of Šternberk. Supported by Prince Zdeněk Vojtěch Popel of Lobkowicz he became the second (1605) and then the first (1611) secretary of the German expedition (office) of the Bohemian Court Chancery, the highest office in Bohemia. In 1608 he got the predicate of Rosenfeld from Rudolf II, Holy Roman Emperor.

== Defenestration ==
On 23 May 1618 Filip Fabricius was present in the offices of the Bohemian Court Chancery on Prague Castle together with Catholic Lords Regent Jaroslav Bořita of Martinice, Vilém Slavata of Chlum and Košumberk, Adam of Šternberk and Děpolt of Lobkowicz when armed Protestant Lords arrived and required confessions of guilt for the anti-Protestant policies of the king. Slavata and Martinice were found guilty and thrown out of the windows. Since the hated royal secretary Pavel Michna was not present, the Protestant Lords decided to punish the other secretary – Filip Fabricius. Only Slavata was seriously wounded by the 70-foot (21 m) fall; Martinice and Fabricius escaped with light injuries. Fabricius left Prague immediately and went to Vienna.

Fabricius was later ennobled by the emperor and granted the title Baron von Hohenfall (literally "Baron of Highfall").

== Later life ==
Fabricius was one of the first people who informed the Vienna royal court of the Protestant rebellion in Prague. He stayed in Vienna and supported the Catholic side as an officer. After the Battle of White Mountain he was appointed a chamber councillor, vice-chamberlain of the dowry cities, sheriff of Mladá Boleslav region, and a member of some other important councils. He was also given several new estates in Prague and Mělník region. His noble epithet was extended with of Hohenfall (lit. 'of high fall').

He died in Prague on 18 October 1632 and is buried in Church of St. James the Great in the Old Town of Prague.
