= The Princely Lovers Garland =

Song

The Princely Lovers Garland is an English broadside ballad from the 18th century. It tells the story of a young royal couple who overcome separation, shipwreck, imprisonment, and the princess's father to finally join together in happy marriage. Copies of the broadside are available at the Huntington Library, the British Library, and the National Library of Scotland.

== Synopsis ==
The narrator tells the story of a history he once read about two lovers. It is told in four parts. In the first part, he introduces the lovers as a King's daughter and a prince who is unaware of his royal heritage. The prince falls in love with the princess, but is afraid to speak to her because of her father's power. She sees him walking around the royal garden talking to himself, and falls in love with him. The princess's brother also likes the man, and together they ask who he is and where he's from. The prince woos the princess, which the King sees as high treason. At the end of the first part, the King feeds the prince to the lions.

In the second part, we learn that the lions don't eat him because they recognize his royal blood. When the lion's keeper comes in to feed them, the prince makes him promise to tell the king that the lions picked his bones clean. He runs away and writes to the daughter that he is alive. Along with the princess's brother, the prince figures out a way to steal the princess away from her father. They sail away together, but violent storms tear the boat apart and they each survive by floating on separate planks. A fisherman picks up the prince and turns him over to the king. The king puts him in a dungeon. The prince tells the jailor that he will give him gold to set him free. The jailor undoes his chains, and the prince kills him and runs away.

In the third part, the prince travels to Bohemia. At dinner one night, an apparition appears and tells the King and Queen of Bohemia that the prince is actually their son, who has been missing since the rebellion. The apparition is his nurse, who was supposed to kill him as a baby but couldn't do it. Instead, she took the boy out into the woods and raised him for three years before she was killed by a lion. Meanwhile, back in England, the princess's father vows to burn the prince's corpse, which he pretends is being sent away in a hearse. The princess and her brother uncover the body and discover the jailer. The princess vows to find the prince, so she dresses in men's clothes and tracks him down. Thinking she's a man, he agrees to take her on as his page.

In the final part of the ballad, the prince and his paige go hunting. They find a farmer's house, where they share a bed that night. In the middle of the night, the prince yells out that he misses the princess. The paige tells him that he has a picture of the princess back at the royal palace. The next day they return to the palace and the prince waits impatiently for the picture. Instead of a picture, the paige takes off her man's clothing and dresses as herself. When the prince goes to find his paige, he finds his lover. They are married and they send the news to her father, who is forced to accept the union.

== Adaptations ==
Reverend Sabine Baring-Gould adapted the tale as The Gardener Prince and set the tale in late Antiquity (ca. 451), around the Hun invasions of Eastern Europe. The gardener is a Bohemian prince named Wenceslas, cast out from his home and adopted as Oriol (from French or, 'gold'). His lover is Princess Marcella from France, twin sister to prince Marcellus.
