= Baltasar Marradas =

Count Baltasar Marradas Knight of Malta
- Baltazar de Marradas et Vique
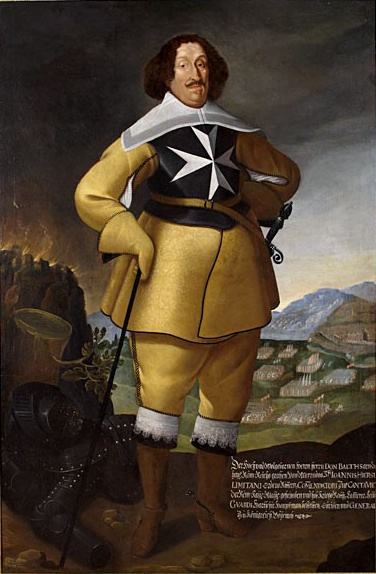
- Anonymous portrait of Baltasar Marradas from the Military History Institute in Prague
- Born: 28 November 1560; Valencia
- Died: 12 August 1638 (aged 77); Prague, Habsburg monarchy
- Military career
- Allegiance: Habsburg
- Conflicts: Long Turkish War, Uskok War, Thirty Years' War

Don Baltasar de Marradas et Vique or Maradas (28 November 1560 – 12 August 1638) was a Spanish nobleman and imperial field marshal during the Thirty Years' War, as well as the governor of Bohemia.

== Life ==
Baltasar Marradas was born on 28 November 1560 in Valencia. He was the son of Gaspar de Marradas Soler (d. 1569), Baron of Sallent, and the Viceroy of Mallorca (1548–1557), and Anna vich Manrique. Both came from large noble families who had performed important services to the king as admirals, ambassadors, generals, and prelates. Anne was the sister of Luis the Viceroy of Mallorca (1573–1584), and of Juan vich Manrique the Bishop of Mallorca (later Archbishop of Tarragona). Baltasar's uncle was Guillen de San Clemente y de Centelles (1530–1608), aka Guillem de Santcliment i de Centelled. He was a Spanish politician, soldier, diplomat, a knight of Santiago, and Commander of Moratalla. He started young in the art of weapons. After becoming an Knight Hospitalier, he left for Malta where he "gained the opinion of a courageous soldier and a great knight". As such, he fought in Piedmont, Milan, and Flanders.

Marradas, a knight of Malta, arrived at the imperial court of Rudolf II in 1599, in the midst of the Long Turkish War. In 1617 during the Uskok War he fought against the Republic of Venice in defense of Gradisca. In the war against Bohemian King Frederick V in 1619 (Bohemian Revolt), he commanded a Spanish cavalry regiment.

Despite the fact that he could show no great military successes, he was raised in 1621 to the rank of an imperial count and provided with plenty of land. In 1626 he became a field marshal and in 1627 was appointed lieutenant general. Marradas was involved in the negotiations for the dismissal of Wallenstein in 1630 in Regensburg. At Prague in 1631, he retreated without a fight to the advancing troops from Saxony, under Hans Georg von Arnim-Boitzenburg. After further failures in Silesia, he was deposed in 1632 at the instigation of Wallenstein. Marradas 1634 was one of the masterminds behind the murder of Wallenstein.

In 1634, Baltasar Marradas was appointed commissioner of the army of Bohemia with an appanage of 800 florins monthly in 30 parts.

He died on 12 August 1638 in Prague as a privy councilor and governor of Bohemia.
