= New Town Hall (Prague) =

- Novoměstská radnice
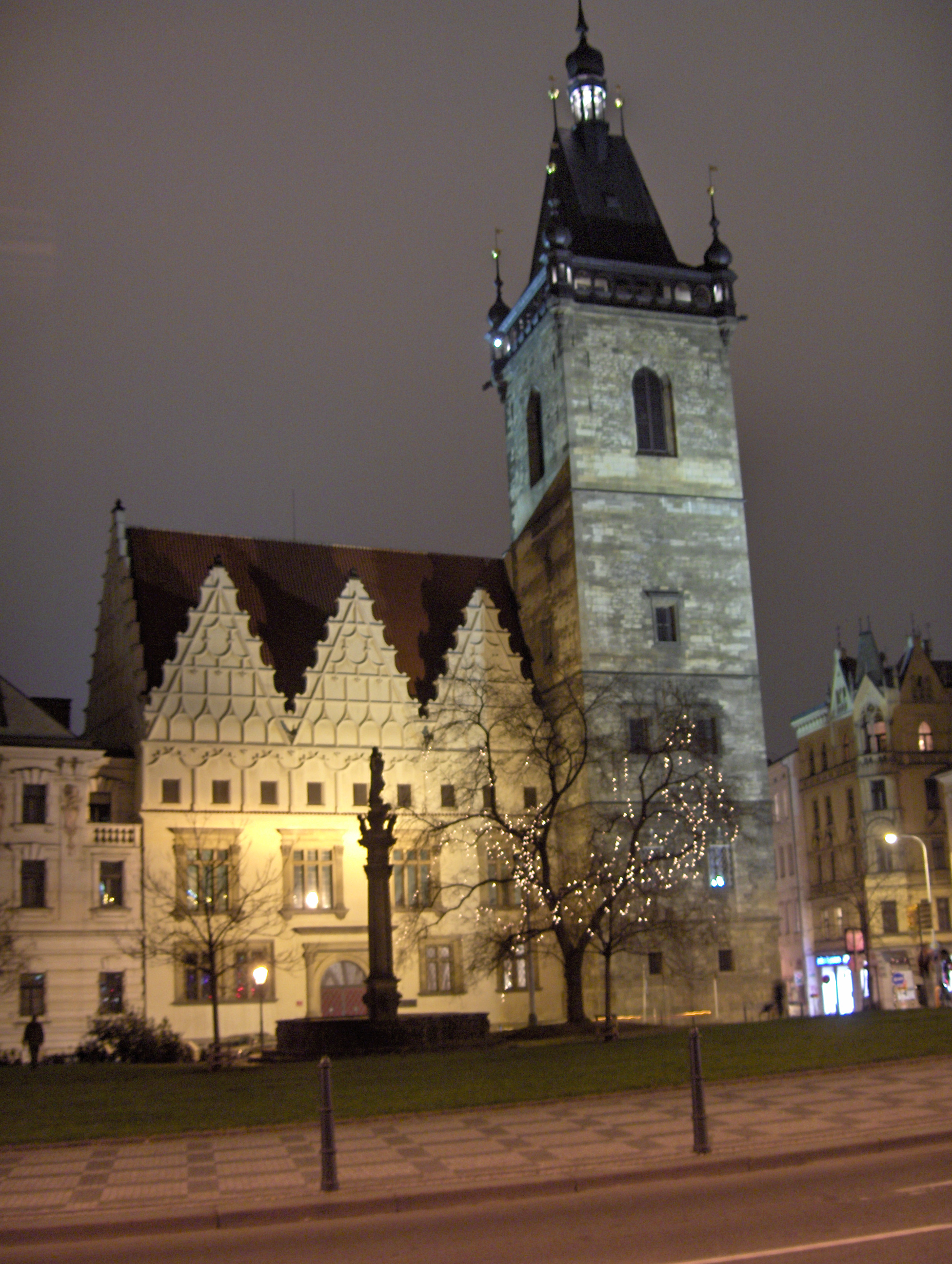
- Interactive map of the New Town Hall area

General information
- Location: New Town, Prague 1, Czech Republic
- Coordinates: 50°04′41″N 14°25′17″E

Website
- https://www.nrpraha.cz/en/

The New Town Hall (Czech: Novoměstská radnice, German: Neustädter Rathaus) is the administrative centre of Prague's (medieval) New Town Quarter, or "Nové Město". In 1419 it was the site of the first of the three defenestrations of Prague.
