= New Town, Prague =

Quarter in the city of Prague, Czech Republic

New Town Nové Město
- Cadastral Area of Prague
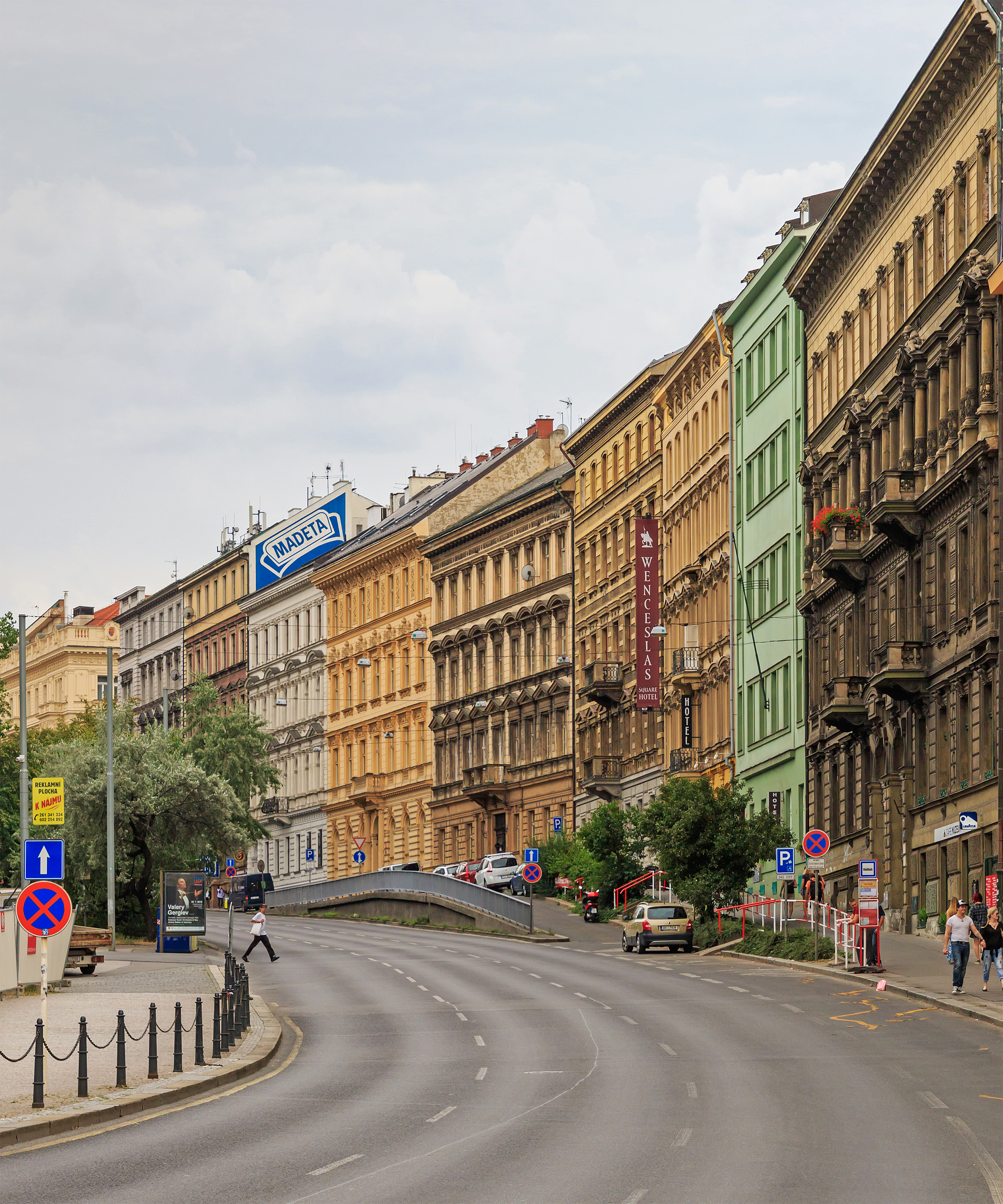
- A street in New Town

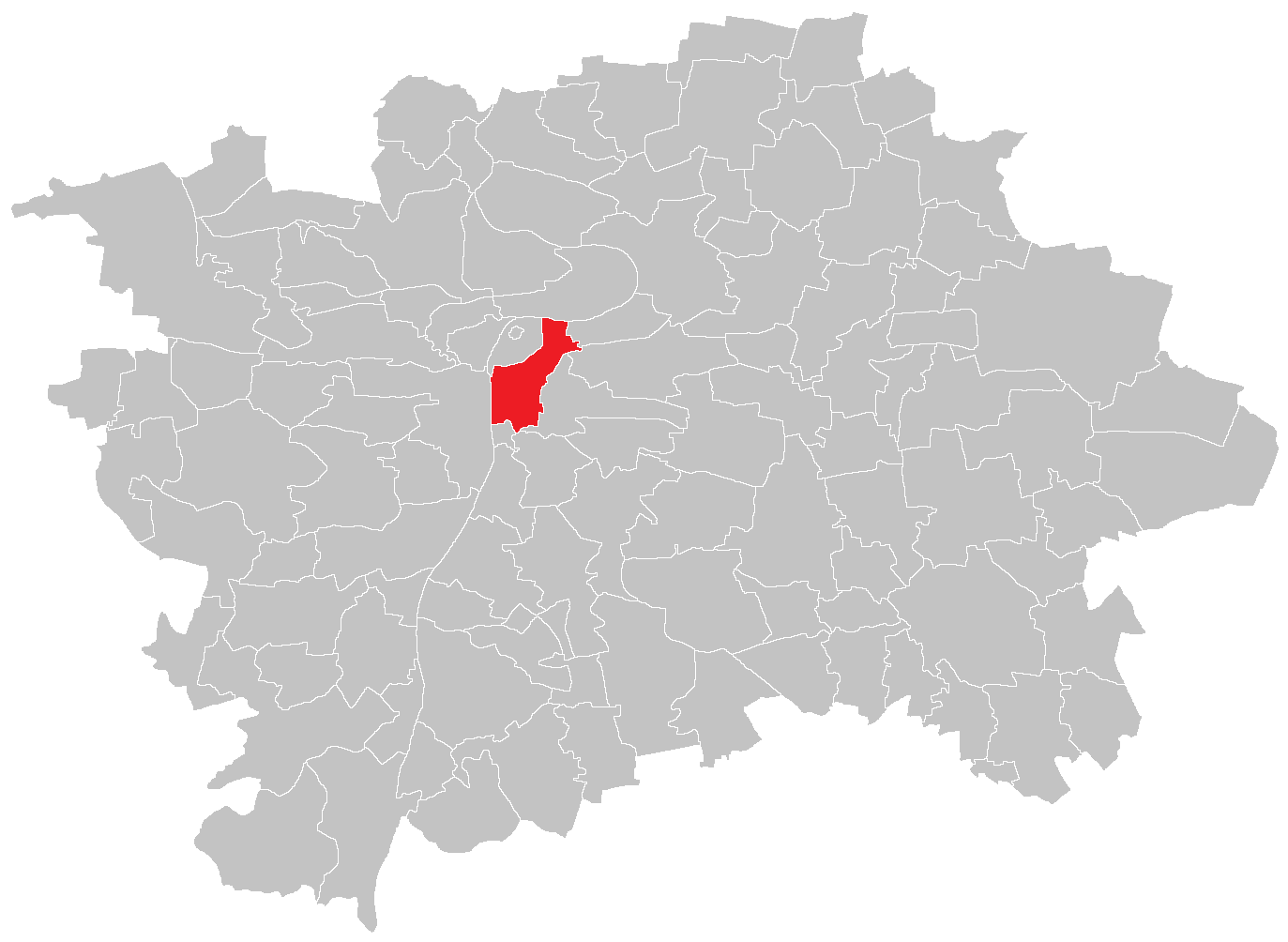
- Location of New Town in Prague
- Coordinates: 50°4′36″N 14°25′35″E
- Country: Czech Republic
- Region: Prague
- District: Prague 1, Prague 2, Prague 8

Area
  - Total: 3.34 km^{2} (1.29 sq mi)

Population (2021)
  - Total: 21,941
  - Density: 6,570/km^{2} (17,000/sq mi)
- Time zone: UTC+1 (CET)
  - Summer (DST): UTC+2 (CEST)
- Postal code: 110 00

New Town (Czech: Nové Město) is a quarter in the city of Prague in the Czech Republic. New Town is the youngest and largest of the five independent (from the Middle Ages until 1784) towns that today comprise the historic center of modern Prague. New Town was founded in 1348 by Charles IV just outside the city walls to the east and south of the Old Town and encompassed an area of 7.5 km^{2}; about three times the size of the Old Town. The population of Prague in 1378 was well over 40,000, perhaps as much as twice that, making it the 4th most populated city north of the Alps and, by area, the 3rd largest city in Europe. Although New Town can trace its current layout to its construction in the 14th century, only few churches and administrative buildings from this time survive. There are many secular and educational buildings in New Town, but also especially magnificent gothic and baroque churches. These nevertheless are not the main drawing points for tourists. New Town's most famous landmark is Wenceslas Square, which was originally built as a horsemarket and now functions as a center of commerce and tourism. In the 15th century, the Novoměstská radnice, or New Town Hall, was the site of the first of the three defenestrations of Prague.

== Foundation ==
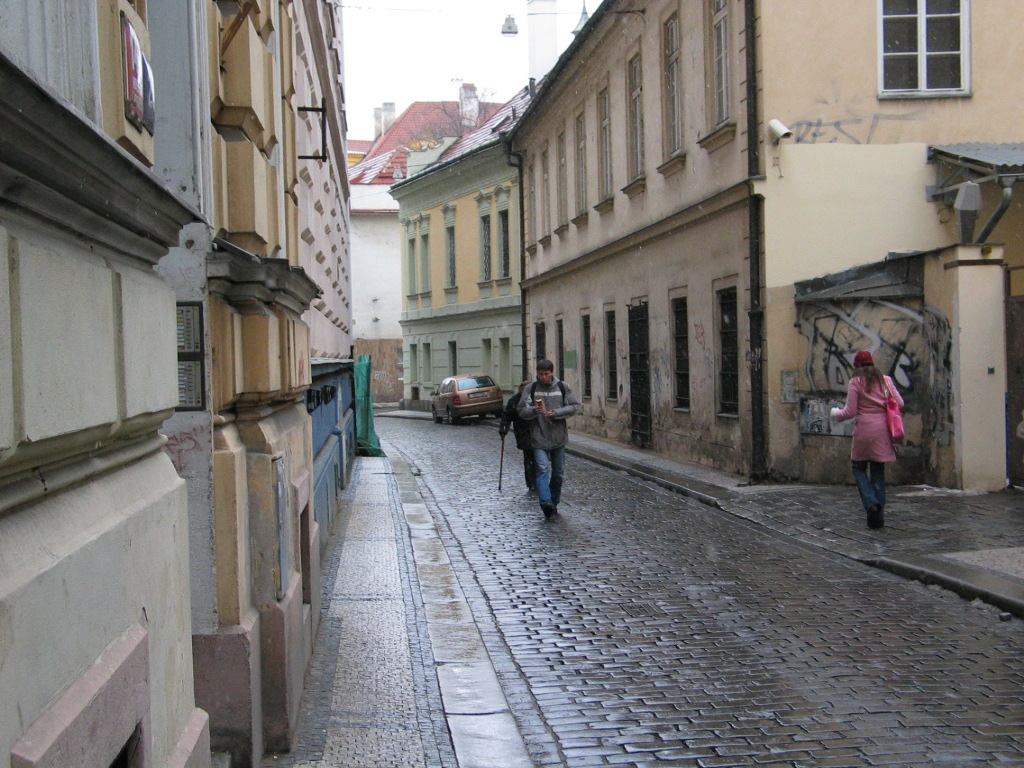
A street in the New Town

No doubt in connection with his coronation as king under the Holy Roman Empire in 1346, Charles IV decided to found a new city in Prague. After he had achieved the city's independence within the church with the creation of the Archbishopric of Prague in 1344, the foundation of the New Town was intended further to enhance the status of the city which was the new residence of the king. In addition, the housing problem within the city walls of Prague that had already been apparent under Charles IV's father John of Luxembourg was crying out for a solution. Many people, mostly poorer Czechs, had settled in suburbs situated at the base of the city walls, and the banks of the Vltava were almost continuously built over.

What was original about Charles IV's action was that he chose, instead of creating an administratively dependent suburb, or an extension of the old town, as was the usual practice, to create in the New Town an independent royal city with its own legal framework. Nevertheless, Charles planned a physical and legal union with the old part of town and decreed a common administration in 1367; however, primarily due to the opposition of the two town councils, this failed and had to be abandoned as little as ten years later. After many rights and liberties had been granted to the inhabitants of the new city, the inhabitants of the old part of town, which was now enclosed by the New Town on all sides, likewise had their existing rights and liberties confirmed in writing, and they were given the assurance of free access through both the northern gates of the New Town.

Together with the establishment of the New Town, the king made further efforts to increase the significance of the town. It was not only to be the new residence of the king and a centre for scholarship - on 7 April 1348, Charles University was founded as the first university in central Europe - and for the arts, but it was intended to become an important economic centre in Central Europe. To that end a shift of Central European traffic routes and the creation of new routes was planned, as well as making the Vltava navigable; and the plans had been carried out to some extent. The construction of the New Town was probably essentially complete as early as 1367, at the time of the short-lived union with the Old Town.

== Expansion of the New Town, topographic and geological conditions ==
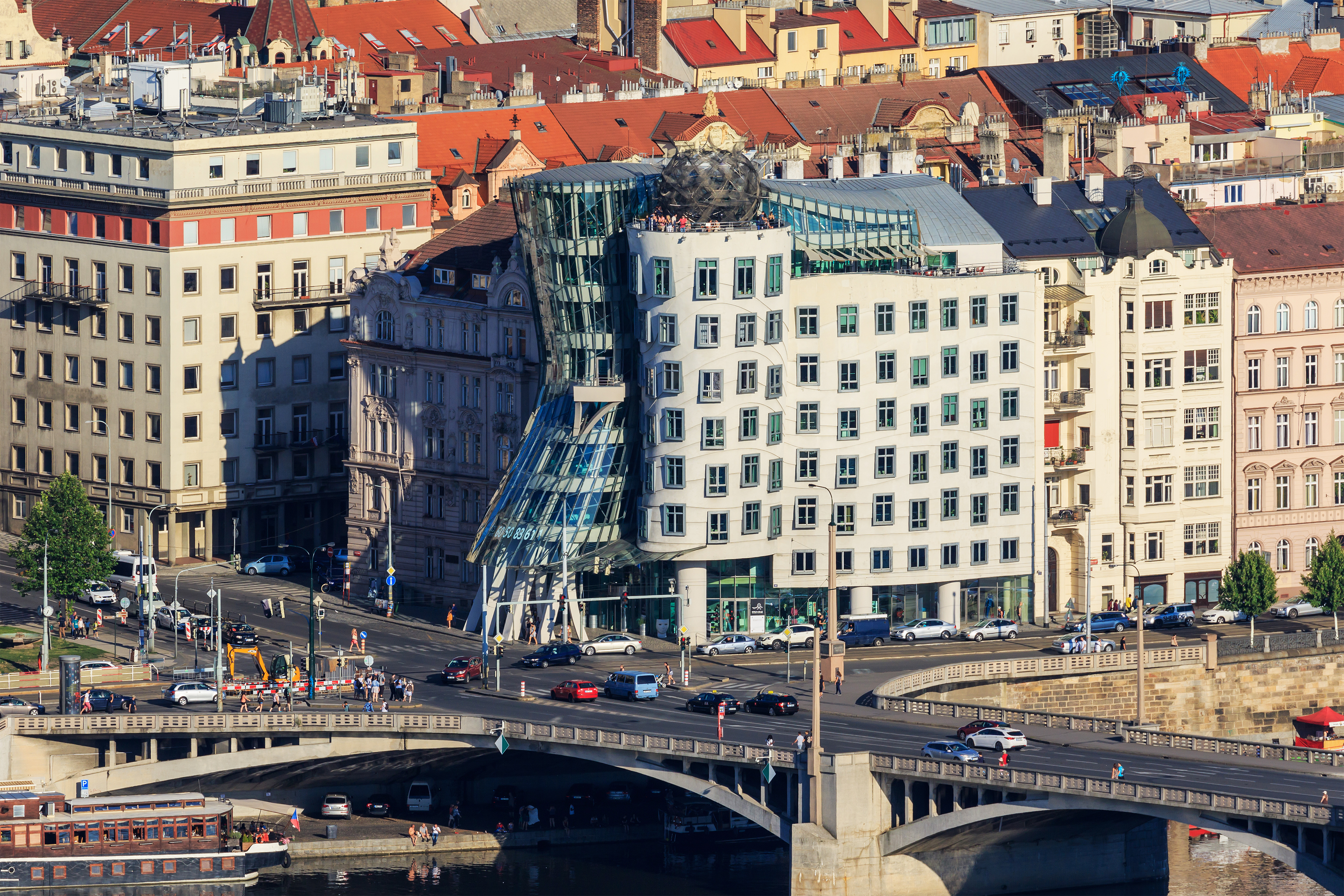
Jiraskovo namesti with the Dancing House is on the bank of the Vltava River

The new city covered an area of about 250 hectares (620 acres) and was thus more than double the size of the Old Town (106 hectares or 260 acres). It was about 5 kilometres (3.1 mi) long from North to South, and 0.8 to 1.2 km (½ to ¾ mile) wide from east to west. The planned area was subdivided into several plots, according to the suitability of the land for the arrangement of the new town. Along the Vltava, from Vyšehrad towards the Old Town, several settlements of tanners and fishermen, with their own churches as well as a Jewish cemetery, already existed. To the West of the Old Town, on the Vltava, the settlement of Poříčí ("Riverside") was already densely built, containing two churches, St. Clement's and St. Peter's, as well as the bishop's court.

An east-facing terrace of land was clearly separated by a pronounced gully, 6 to 8 meters deep, from the plain on the bank of the river. The upper plateau was dominated by two ridges projecting far to the west, which were intended later to be occupied by planned constructions. Here likewise already existed some smaller settlements such as Na Rybníčku or Rybníček ("By the Pond") with a Romanesque rotunda, which was probably originally dedicated to St Stephen.

== The fortification ==
The building of the New Town commenced on 26 March 1348 with the ceremonial laying of the first stone of the New Town wall by Charles IV. The wall not only provided security for the planned new town, but also legally separated it from the surrounding land. The importance which was attached to the fortification is, inter alia, evident in the fact that it took only two years to complete, although it was relatively low in comparison with the walls of older Bohemian cities.

The wall of the New Town began in Vyšehrad (whose fortification was renewed at the same time) and ran from there along the escarpment of the upper Vltava terrace by the Botič Brook to the highest point of the area, on which Charles' Court (with the Church of the Ascension of the BVM and Emperor Charles the Great) was later erected. The wall turned at this point and continued almost precisely north. After a slight turn to the east between the city gate at Ječná (Barley) Lane and the horse market (now Wenceslas Square), the wall then ran along the St Vitus' Hill brook, whose deeply cut valley maintained a constant distance from the Old Town until it reached the Vltava where the wall turned again, this time to the west.

Unlike the Old Town, no wall was erected along the Vltava, since free access to the river had to be ensured. In total, the wall was about 3.5 kilometres (2.2 mi) long, 6–10 meters tall, 3–5 meters wide and topped with battlements. While towers were placed along the eastern side every 100 meters, just one (in the valley) sufficed in the south, due to the steepness of the adjacent ground. Stronger towers were situated at the corners of the wall in the south-east and in the north-east at the St Vitus' Hill brook, as well as at the north end by the Vltava. The wall was breached only by four gates and a few small posterns. The wall was further protected by a ditch, where water mostly flowed in former stream beds, but it was dry in some places because of the differences in height. Evidently there was no outer wall (outside the ditch).

== Population ==
Historical population

Year	Pop.	±%
1869	73,277	—
1880	74,355	+1.5%
1890	75,734	+1.9%
1900	84,462	+11.5%
1910	81,760	−3.2%

Year	Pop.	±%
1921	87,329	+6.8%
1930	78,121	−10.5%
1950	64,636	−17.3%
1961	64,805	+0.3%
1970	54,907	−15.3%

Year	Pop.	±%
1980	44,224	−19.5%
1991	34,991	−20.9%
2001	28,113	−19.7%
2011	27,105	−3.6%
2021	21,941	−19.1%

Source: Censuses

== Layout ==
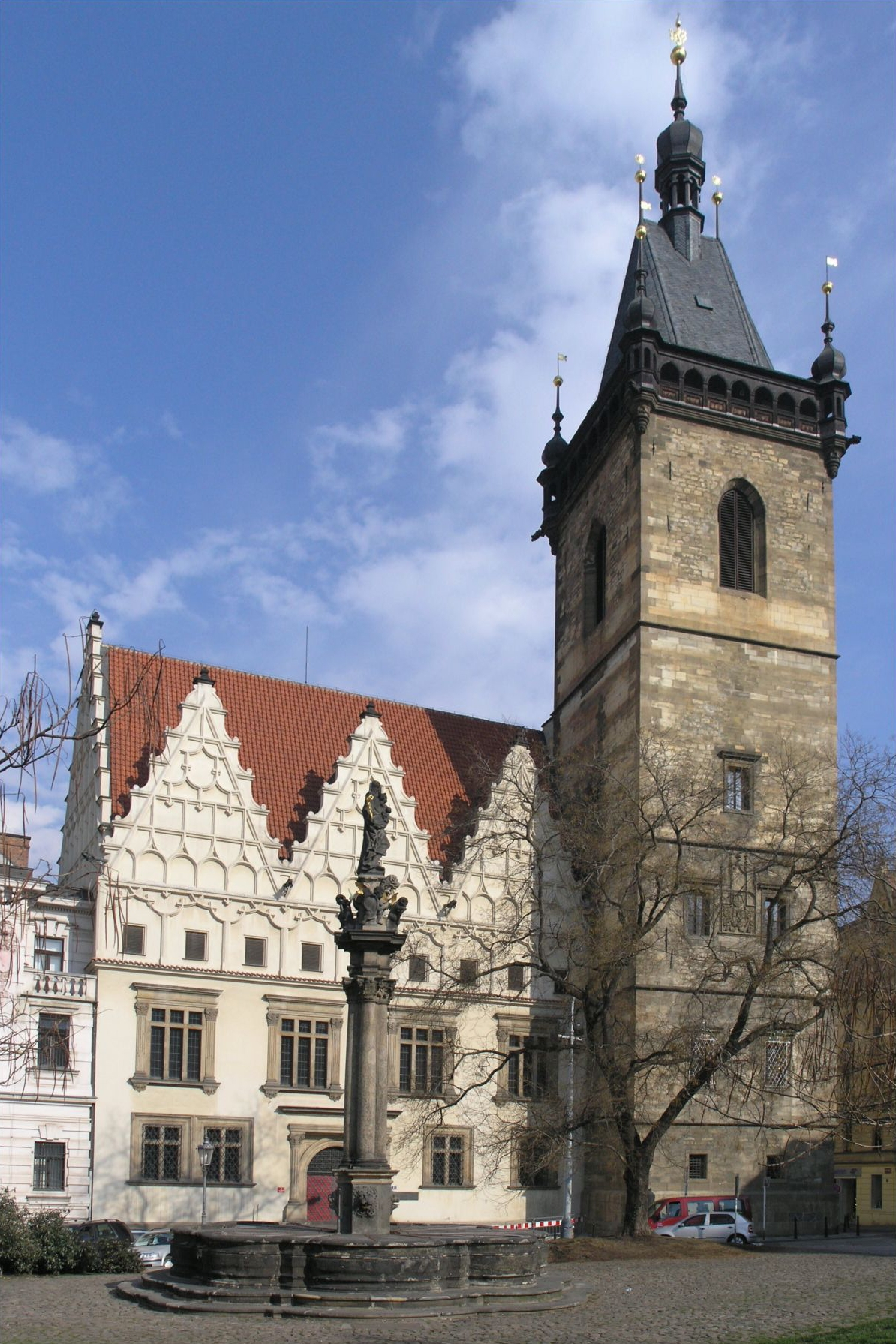
Prague New Town Hall

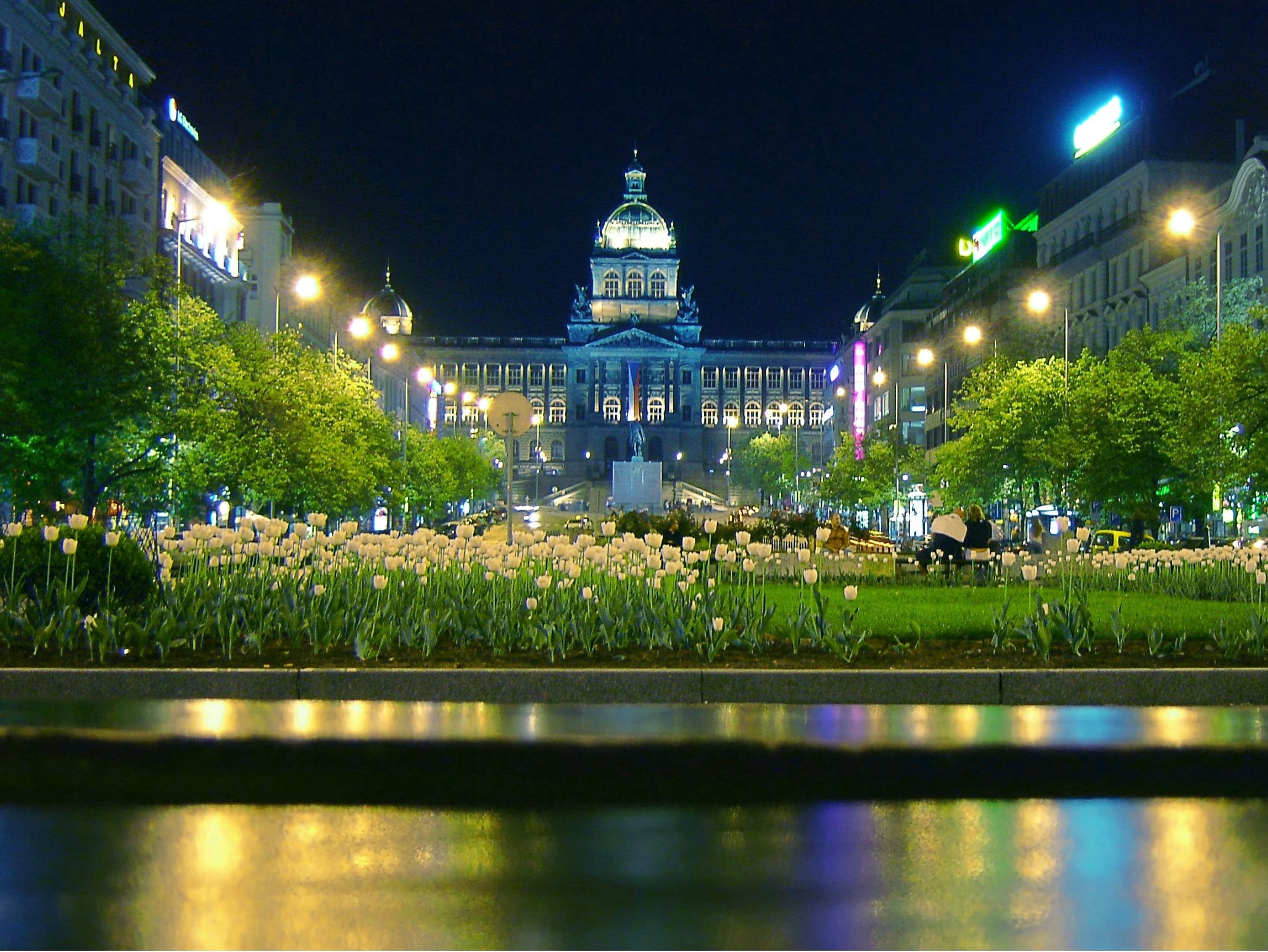
Wenceslas Square at night

At the foundation of the New Town in 1348, the enclosed area was already mostly surveyed, divided into parcels. The plan for the roads as well as the positions of the various markets and the goods to be sold in each of them were all already determined. The structure of the older settlements on the Vltava was broadly maintained; but on the remaining, so far undeveloped terrain, unusually broad streets and squares were created; however the routes of already existing roadways were respected. The area of the New Town was however so large that it could not immediately be settled completely, and large sections in the north around the settlement of Poříčí and in the southeast remained undeveloped into the 19th century. The planning of the New Town was probably the responsibility of the French master cathedral builder Matthias of Arras, who had been brought to Prague from Avignon by Charles IV in 1342/44.

Charles IV expressly forbid property speculation and granted to all, who wanted to settle, twelve years exemption from taxes. However, for the tax exemption to be earned, construction of a stone building had to be begun on the specified plot within a month and completed within one and a half years. This privilege was made available not only to Christians, but also to Jews; however few of the latter made use of it.

City accounting records show that by 1372 the streets of the New Town were already built up with houses for the most part. An important reason for the rapid settlement of the New Town was the decree of Charles IV that noisy and dirty trades were to be shifted from the Old Town to the New Town. Within the New Town concentrations of specific craftsmen developed around the appropriate markets. For example, fishermen, carpenters, raftsmen, tanners, dyers, brickmakers and limeburners were to be found along the Vltava, and around the horse market were located farriers, wagonmakers, coppersmiths and cabinetmakers. Thus the New Town was particularly inhabited by poorer craftsmen of Czech nationality, who had always dominated in the older riverside villages, while in the Old Town mostly German and Jewish craftsmen were found. These large economic and national differences resulted in a clear separation of the two cities and were finally also decisive for the disturbances during the Hussite Revolution at the end of the reign of Wenceslas IV.

=== Lower New Town ===
The Church of St Henry and Cunigunde, with four trusses and three steeples of equal height, which was near an existing settlement, was established as the main parish church of the New Town (Latin: ecclesia parochialis primaria) starting from 1350, immediately after the completion of the wall. Before the free-standing bell tower was built, the tower at the southwest corner of the church probably fulfilled this function. Likewise, the parish school at the church was established by Charles IV and even in the 16th and 17th centuries it was still counted among the best schools in Bohemia and along with the university was one of the most outstanding educational institutes in Prague. Not far from the church, on the site of the main post office (Hlavní pošta) built between 1871 and 1874, were the botanical gardens of Charles University, laid out by the apothecary and personal physician of Charles IV, Angelus de Florentia, which was called the Andělská zahrada ("Angel's Garden"), the first botanical garden of Europe.

The economic center of the northern quarter was the Hay and Straw Market, which aligns roughly with the modern Senovážné náměstí. Wilfried Brosche was most likely responsible for planning the hay market in similar vein to the horse market. Present day Hibernia Street (Hybernská ulice) forms the southern boundary of the former market. As early as 1379, it was paved ("strata lapidae") as the first road of the New Town, and thus received its older name Pavement Lane (Czech: Dlážděná ulice). The market ran along the old road to Kutná Hora which was the main route toward the east. At the entrance to the Old Town stood the "Tattered or Ragged gate" (Czech: Odraná brána) or as it was later called St. Ambrosius Gate at the end of Celetná (Tentmaker Street). A renewal of the gate was apparently already intended under Charles IV. The existing Powder Gate (Czech: Prašná brána) was first built in 1475. The Mountain Gate or St Vitus' Gate (Czech: Horská brána) formed the upper end of the New Town wall. Also at the lower end of the Haymarket, Charles IV let a Benedictine monastery (Milanese rite) be established in 1355. The monastery and church were dedicated to St Ambrosius, in commemoration of the coronation of Charles as the king of Lombardy on 5 January of the same year in Milan Cathedral, where St Ambrosius was bishop in the 4th century. In addition, near the monastery, probably opposite the St. Benedict Gate of the Old Town, was the John and Jacob almshouse.

The second important market street in the lower New Town was River Street (Na Poříčí). It can be traced back to an old route, which began at the St. Benedict Gate of the Old Town and led through the pre-existing settlement to the Vltava. In the east the St Peter Gate or River Gate (Czech: Poříčská brána) was established as part of the city defenses of the New Town (it was removed in 1873). The two original Roman Catholic churches, the Church of St. Peter at Poříčí (Kostel sv. Petra na Poříčí) and the Church of St. Clement at Poříčí (Kostel sv. Klimenta na Poříčí), both underwent extensive extensions and changes in the second half of the 14th century.

Between the old settlement and the new construction north of the horse market, there remained much undeveloped open space, starting approximately from the height of the St. Henry's Church, which was only sparsely built and was mainly filled with gardens and green spaces.

=== Upper New Town ===
The upper New Town became the focus of even greater importance. An old road to Vyšehrad and beyond to southern Bohemia would become the longest traffic route in Prague and the backbone of the upper New Town - today's Spálená, Vyšehradská and Na Slupi streets. It began at the St. Martins or Zderaz Gate at Perštýn and formed an extension of an important Old Town thoroughfare. Traffic at the southern end of the new city was now directed over the Vyšehrad, and continued up to the only tower in the south at the steepest part of the city wall, which secured a postern with no through passage and the water outflow of the Botič stream and the mill ditch. The section of the road along the Vltava had to accommodate the existing settlements of Opatovice, Zderaz and Podskalí so in this area, the old narrow and bent road courses were maintained here. (Only with the building of the Vltava quay and the transformation of almost all the bankside areas at the end of the 19th and the beginning of the 20th century were most buildings including some churches and the old structures eliminated.)

By contrast, in the largely unsettled area to the east of the road to the Vyšehrad, a planned system of broad parallel roads were built in a grid pattern, which is still clearly visible today. Two of these roads, each nearly 27 meters wide, formed a crossroads at the cattle market and carried the grain trade; they came to be known as Rye Lane (Žitná ulice) and Barley Lane (Ječná ulice). At the end of Barley Lane (also known as Pig Lane (Svinský trh, Svinská ul.), since it likewise served the small animal trade) near the old St John at the Battlefield Church (Kostel sv. Jan Na bojišti) stood the fourth gate, the Pig Gate (Svinská brána) or St. John's Gate. While the other gates consisted of a passage and two flanking towers, St John's Gate was built as a fortress. It consisted of a central courtyard with barrel-curved arched rooms on both sides, over it was an overhanging lintel with eight corner towers and a further higher tower standing over the gate entrance. The gate also protected the entrance of a brook into the New Town, whose water also fed the fish pond of the former settlement, Rybníček. (The gate was torn down between 1891 and 1897 with the adjacent city wall, but during construction work on the Metro station I. P. Pavlova, remainders of the gate were found as well as some tiles with old provincial coats-of arms as well as fragments of a relief with the Bohemian lion which were saved and today stand in the entry of the station.) Apart from the two water gates, the St. John's Gate formed the last access until the east gate of the Vyšehrad, so all the other routes south of Barley Lane also converged on this gate. These were probably roads of older origin and were developed without a strict plan to adapt to the complicated elevations within this area; apart from church plots this area remained to a large extent vacant.

In the center of the road Charles IV created today's Charles Square by widening the cattle market (Dobytčí trh), to the east. With an area of approximately 550 by 150 meters, this was for a long time the largest square in Europe and in became the administrative and economic center of the New Town. It served mainly the trade in cattle, fish, wood and coal and its central status was only in recent times ceded to Wencenslas Square.

In the center of the cattle market, in the extension of the Barley Lane, Charles IV had a wooden tower built, where since 1354 the crown jewels and reliquaries were put on display once a year. The sanctuary celebration was proclaimed by Charles as a general holiday in the realm, whereby Prague became one of the most important centers of pilgrimage in Europe. Next to the wooden tower the Chapel of Holy Blood or Corpus Christi was built between 1382 and 1393 and was torn down in 1791. From the octagonal central church with attached chapels rose a stone tower, from whose gallery were shown the reliquaries and crown jewels were displayed.

In a dominant position at the northeast corner of the cattle market the New Town city hall (Novoměstská radnice) was built as symbol of the independent royal city after 1367, but not later than 1377 during the renewed separation from the Old Town. The remaining sides of the cattle market were filled quite briskly after the plan of the square, whereby members of the aristocracy and the royal houses established themselves here. For example, on the south side was the Gothic Palace of the Princes of Opava whose property extended far to the south.

== Possible models for the city plan ==
It seems possible, that when Charles IV was planning the New Town, he used Rome as a model; in particular the broad even roads and the powerful city gates are reminiscent. Similarly, other emperors have sought to create a "Roma Nova"; for example, Charlemagne with Aachen, Otto I with Magdeburg and Heinrich II with Bamberg. Grid-based city plans or extensions, if not on this large a scale, were already in existence in Central Europe and even in Bohemia, so that these other towns also probably served as models to Charles IV in the planning the New Town.

The often stated reference to Jerusalem is in contrast to its rather religious nature and reflects the concept of the creation of a new "Valhalla". W. Brosche counts at the time "... around 1400 existing within the New Town area... three hospitals with churches or chapels, nine monasteries with all together ten consecrated spaces, fourteen parish churches with three additional chapels, also the city hall chapel in addition to the consecration places secured with Patrozinien on Vyšehrad, so that the New Town with 40 churches surpassed the Old Town with its 35 places of worship already by the end of the century."

To the monasteries in Prague, came friars and monks from almost every order and from remote countries of Europe. Specifically mentioned are the Benedictines at St. Ambrosius of Milan, the Augustinians from France at Na Karlově, the Servants of the Holy Virgin of the Meadow from Florence and the Slavic Benedictines from Croatia in the Emmaus Church. The monastery of Mary of the Snows was probably manned by Saxon Carmelites.

== Importance ==
In 1378 a census commissioned by Charles IV found that Prague had 40,000 inhabitants, making it the fourth largest city north of the Alps after Paris, Ghent and Bruges. Based on physical area, Prague was the third-largest city in Europe after Rome and Constantinople. When one compares Prague with the other cities in medieval Europe and in particular with the established cities of the 12th to 14th centuries, the privileged position of the Prague New Town becomes clear. Charles IV "... conceived here the largest urban planning project of the Middle Ages, and at the time, its equal could not be found in Europe. In the mid fourteenth century in Europe there was no other city, in which an enclosed building project was organized and executed on such a scale, over two square kilometers. There is no other city, in which 18 to 27 meter-wide roads were created; where an arterial road was wide three-quarters of a kilometer long and over 60 meters wide and in the New Town alone was the central marketplace larger than most entire cities of this time including its walls. Here was planned and established the real administrative, cultural and economic center of Central Europe." (Vilém Lorenc, p13)

== Sights ==
- Dvořák Museum
- Dancing House
- Jubilee Synagogue
- National Museum
- National Theatre
- U Fleků beer hall
- Žofín Palace

== Squares ==
- The horse market, today Wenceslas Square
- The cattle market, today Charles Square
- The hay market (Senovážné náměstí), south of today's Náměstí Republiky
- Na Karlově

== Cloisters and monasteries ==
The Sts. Peter and Paul Church of the Canons and Holy Grave in the settlement Zderaz was converted and rebuilt to serve as the parish church. Numerous further cloisters and monasteries allowed Charles IV to establish a special area of dominance. He had already founded the monastery of St. Mary of the Snows on a spur of the upper plateau along the old road to the Vyšehrad before the creation of an important monastery in the New Town. In direct proximity to the old parish church of the riverside community Podskalí, St. Cosmas and Damian, in the territory of the Vyšehrad cathedral he settled with the agreement of the Pope Clemens VI on 22 November 1347, an order of Benedictine monks who adhered to the old Slavic liturgy. The monastery church, dedicated in 1372, received from them the name St Mary's at the Slavs (klášter P. Marie na Slovanech). Further south on the same street was built in 1360 a Servite monastery, with the church of St Mary on the Lawn (kostel P. Marie na Trávníčku) or "on the pillars" (Na Slupi). Not far from here, in 1355 the Convent of Augustinian Hermitesses (kostel sv. Kateřiny) was founded. This was instituted by Charles in thanks for his first victory on 25 November 1332 at San Felice castle in Italy. It was dedicated on 29 November 1367.

In summary, it may be observed that parish churches and monastery churches are often either linked to predecessor churches or to settlements or streets already existing in the vicinity. In contrast Charles founded two monastery churches on particularly exposed, but long uninhabited sites. Around 1362 was founded the Collegiate Abbey of St. Apollinaris (kostel sv. Apolináře) on the Wind Hill (Větrná hora or Na Větrníku).

At the highest point of the new fortifications in the SE, the wall changed to a northerly direction at the Painters Tower, where there was a small postern. It is clear that this necessitated the building of a third castle-like construction between Hradčany and Vyšehrad, the so-called Charles' Court. In 1350 Charles established some French Augustinian canons here.

The newly founded monastery and abbey churches in the upper New Town were also distinguished from the parish churches in that they were sited on the edge of the built-up area, or their entire surroundings remained almost entirely free. The slopes and plateaux east of Na slupi street and south of the Augustinian convent were merely vineyards and extended green spaces. Not least, another distinguishing feature was a further concept of town planning which was especially clearly visible from Vyšehrad. The five churches named above formed an almost symmetrical cross, in the centre was St. Apollinaris Abbey. The imaginary crossbeam ends with Charles Court and the Emmaus Monastery, which each lack towers, while the long arm of the cross is formed by churches with towers whose upper storey is octagonal. An extension of this arm leads directly to the Vyšehrad, which was thus included in the plan.

Other monastery and abbey churches in the New Town:

- Kirche der Schmerzensreichen Mutter Gottes
- Church of St. John of Nepomuk am Felsen
- Ss. Cyril and Methodius Cathedral

== Parish and cemetery churches ==
The parish churches of the district to be newly settled in the upper New Town included St Stephen's Church (Kostel sv. Štěpána), built between 1351 and 1394. This stood next to an older church, a romanesque rotunda from the 12th century, which had been the parish church of Rybníček. Its financial support was now transferred to the new church; the rotunda was dedicated to St Longinus (Rotunda sv. Longina).

Also in the upper New Town, the churches of the existing settlements on the Vltava were extended during the reigns of Charles IV and Wenceslas IV, and rebuilt in Gothic style. A second, south, aisle, with its own presbytery, was added to the Church of St Adalbert (Kostel sv. Vojtěcha v Jirchářich) near the river bank, in the district of the Tanners and White Tanners (makers of white leather or tawers) around 1370. To the original romanesque St Michael's parish church of Opatovice (Kostel sv. Michala) were added a new choir and, around 1400, two side aisles. Building work was also carried out on St Peter's Church (na struze), which has not been preserved.

To the west of the parish Church of St Wenceslas at Zderaz (Czech: Kostel sv. Václava na Zderaze), King Wenceslas IV had built, starting in 1380, on a promontory overlooking the river, a small Gothic castle, probably with two storeys and vaulted chambers, which also had a five-storey tower and at least two crenellated walls. As part of the project in which the castle church was built, there also followed, before 1399, a Gothic rebuilding of St Wenceslas' Church.

In all probability there were similar enlargements to the Church of St John the Baptist and St Nicholas in Vyšehrad. Until around 1380 there were also some other small churches such as Holy Trinity Church south of the Emmaus Monastery, replaced around 1420 by the Gothic church of St Anthony; St Andrew's; St Michael's (Na slupi); and the Church of the Blessed Virgin Mary under the Vyšehrad and the associated St Elisabeth's Almshouse.

The Church of St. Apollinaire is located in New Town in Prague in Apolinarska street on Vetrov hill.

== The Jews' Garden ==
The almshouse of St Lazarus Church – both broken up at the turn of the century without previous examination – there was also an old Jewish cemetery, the Jews' Garden (Židovská zahrada). As early as 1254, under Ottokar II it was already given privileges. The Jews were further compelled to resettle in the immediate neighbourhood by Charles IV and Wenceslas IV. However they did not develop to the expected numbers, and thus in 1478 the Jewish cemetery was dissolved and the area was parcelled out and built upon. The Jews preferred to resettle in the Ghetto in the Old Town, and they were replaced by the houses of the butchers, whose market hall with 100 counters was already erected before 1349, north of the New Town Hall.

== Literature ==
- V. Huml/Z. Dragoun/R. Novy: Der archäologische Beitrag zur Problematik der Entwicklung Prags in der Zeit vom 9. bis zur Mitte des 13. Jahrhunderts und die Erfassung der Ergebnisse der historisch-archäologischen Erforschung Prags. Zeitschrift für Archäologie des Mittelalters 18/19 (1990/91), S. 33-69.
- František Graus:Prag als Mitte Böhmens 1346-1421. In: Emil Meynen (Hrsg.), Zentralität als Problem der mittelalterlichen Stadtgeschichtsforschung. Städteforschungen. Reihe A: Darstellungen Bd. 8 (Köln, Wien 1979). ISBN 978-3-412-03279-1.
- Vilém Lorenc: Das Prag Karls IV. Die Prager Neustadt. Stuttgart 1982. ISBN 978-3-421-02576-0.
- Nové Město pražské. 1348 - 1784. Praha 1998. ISBN 978-80-85394-19-1.
- Ferdinand Seibt (Hrsg.): Kaiser Karl IV. Staatsmann und Mäzen [Begleitband Ausstellungen Nürnberg und Köln 1978/79]. München 1978. ISBN 978-3-7913-0435-9 (Mehrere Beiträge, besonders zu nennen ist W. Brosche: Zu einem Modell der Prager Neustadt. S. 242-249).
- Jaroslava Staňková /Jiři Štursa/Svatopluk Voděra: Prag. Elf Jahrhunderte Architektur. Historischer Reiseführer. Praha 1991. ISBN 978-80-900003-3-9.

== See also ==
- History of Prague
