= Defenestrations of Prague =

Incidents of political violence (1419, 1483, 1618)

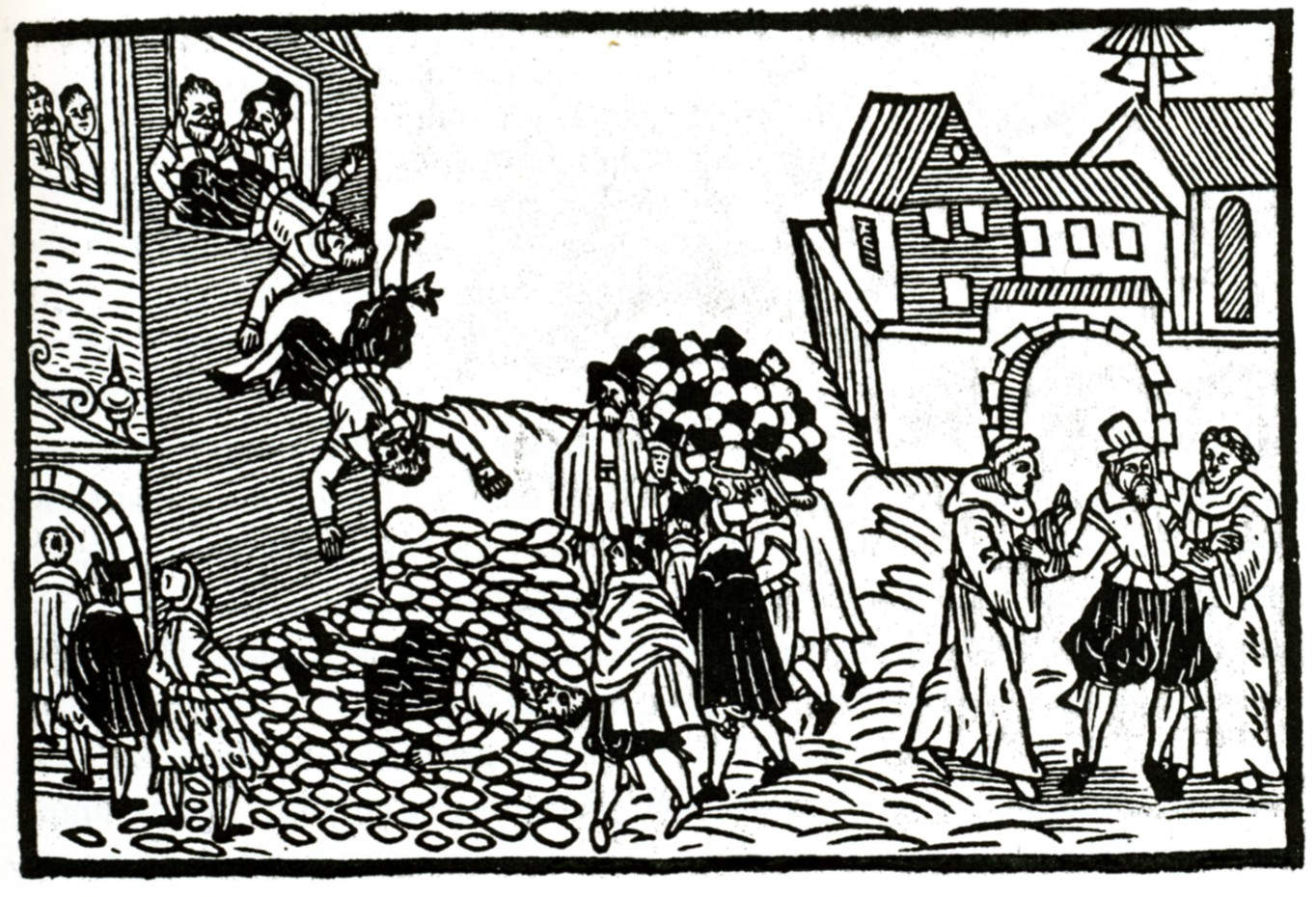
- 1618 defenestration as illustrated on a contemporaneous leaflet
- Date: 30 July 1419; 24 September 1483; 23 May 1618

The Defenestrations of Prague (Czech: Pražské defenestrace, German: Prager Fenstersturz, Latin: Defenestratio Pragensis) were three incidents in the history of Bohemia in which people were defenestrated (thrown out of a window). Though already existing in Middle French, the word defenestrate is believed to have first been used in English in reference to the episodes in Prague in 1618 when the disgruntled Protestant estates threw two royal governors and their secretary out of a window of the Hradčany Castle and wrote an extensive apologia explaining their action. In the Middle Ages and early modern times, defenestration was not uncommon—the act carried elements of lynching and mob violence in the form of murder committed together.

The first governmental defenestration occurred in 1419, the second in 1483 and the third in 1618, although the term "Defenestration of Prague" more commonly refers to the third. Often, however, the 1483 event is not recognized as a "significant defenestration", which leads to some ambiguity when the 1618 defenestration is referred to as the "second Prague defenestration". The first and third defenestrations helped to trigger prolonged religious conflicts, either inside Bohemia (the Hussite Wars, 1st defenestration) or beyond (Thirty Years' War, 3rd defenestration), while the second helped establish a religious peace in the country for 31 years (Peace of Kutná Hora, 2nd defenestration).

== 1419 Defenestration of Prague ==
The first defenestration of Prague involved the killing of several members of the city council by a crowd of Czech Hussites on 30 July 1419. Jan Želivský, the priest of the Church of the Virgin Mary of the Snows, led his congregation on a procession through the streets of Prague to the New Town Hall on Charles Square. The town council members had refused to exchange their Hussite prisoners. While they were marching, a stone was thrown at Želivský from the town hall and allegedly hit him. This enraged the mob and they stormed the town hall. Once inside the hall, the group defenestrated the judge, the burgomaster, and several members of the town council, killing them all.

The First Defenestration led pro-Hussite Bohemian nobles to take control of Bohemia, and the Pope responded by declaring a crusade against "Wycliffites, Hussites and all other heretics in Bohemia", starting the prolonged Hussite Wars.

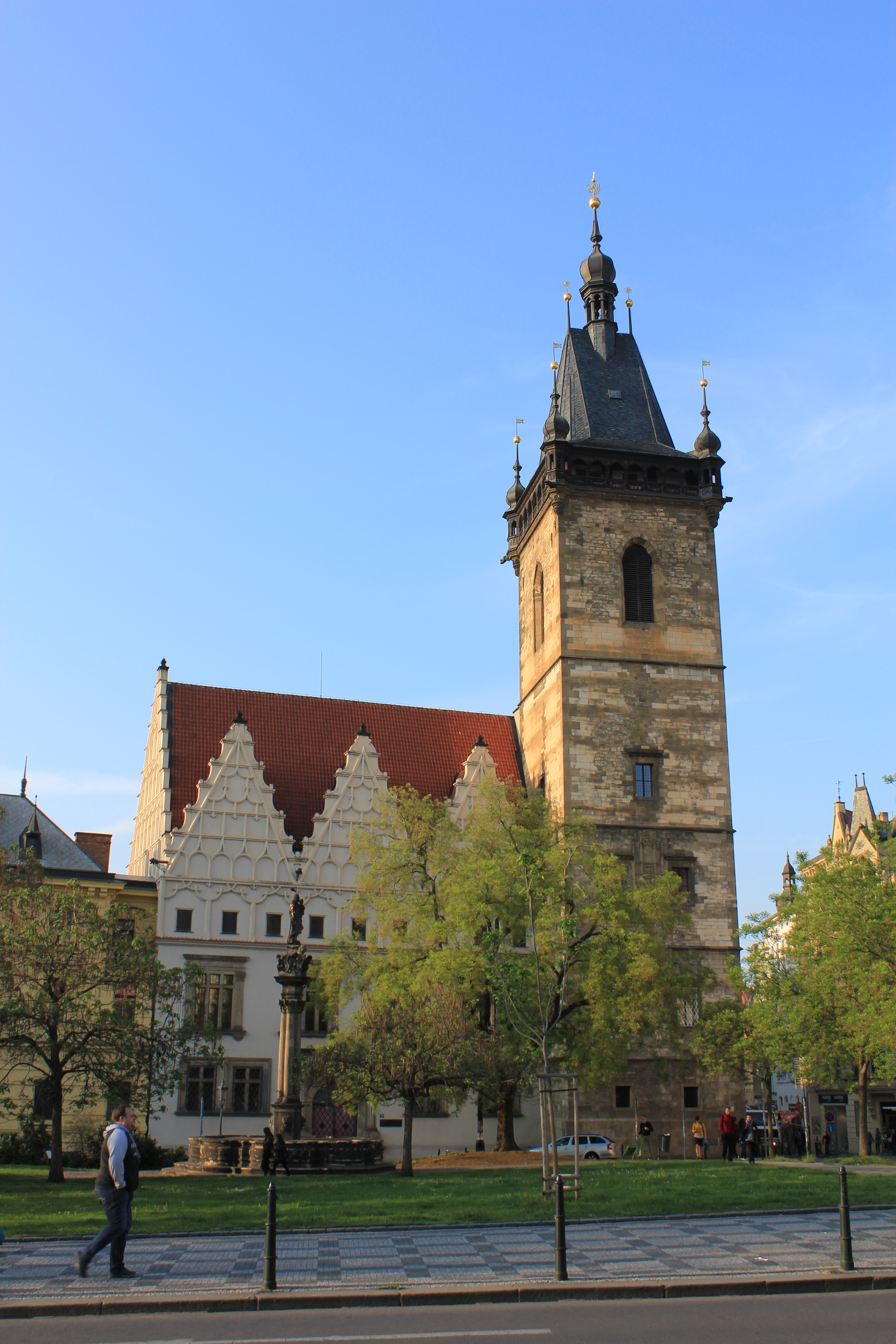
The Novoměstská radnice (lit. 'New Town Hall'), site of the 1419 defenestrations

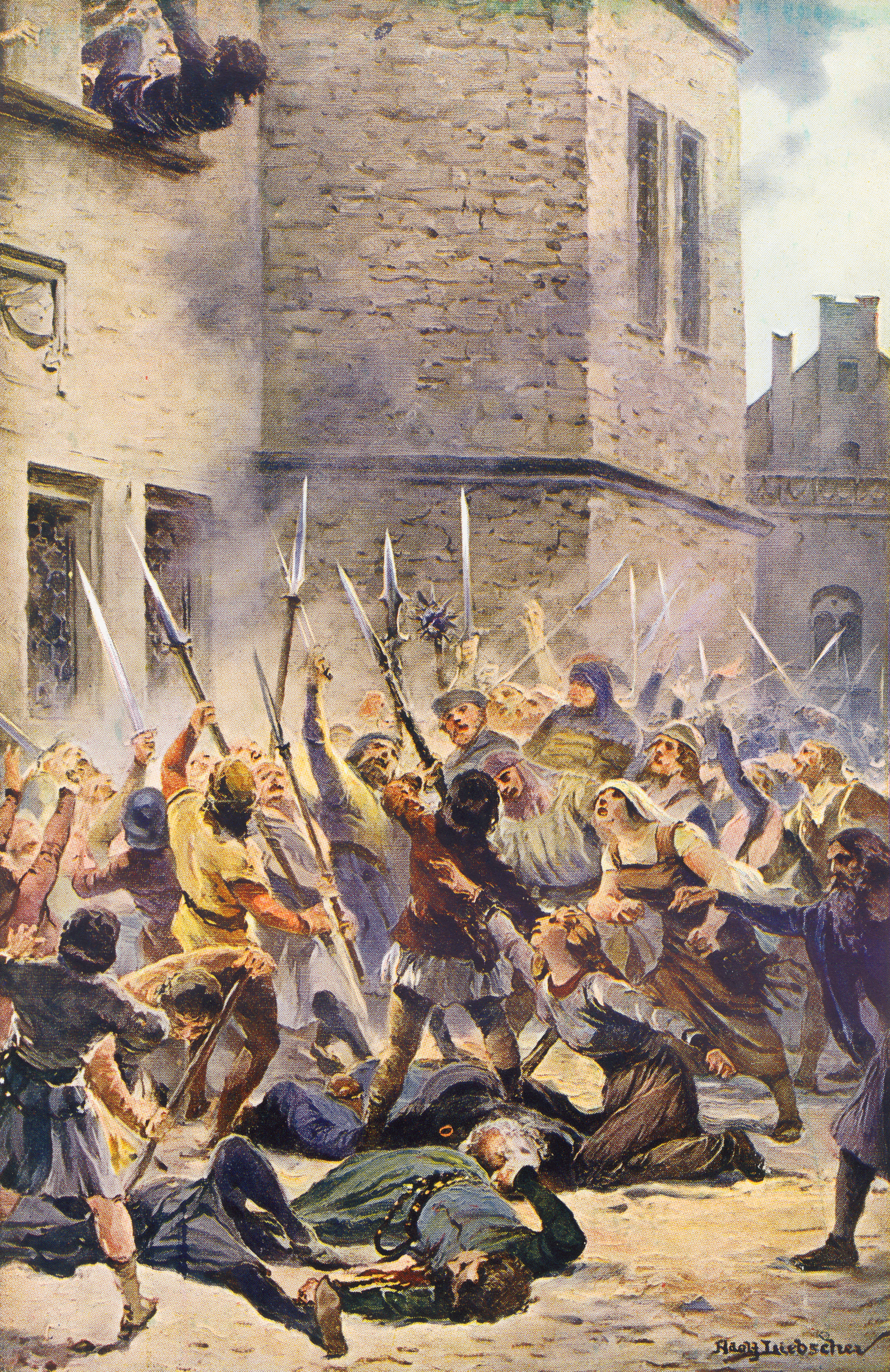
Illustrated by Czech history painter Adolf Liebscher c. 1900

== 1483 Defenestration of Prague ==
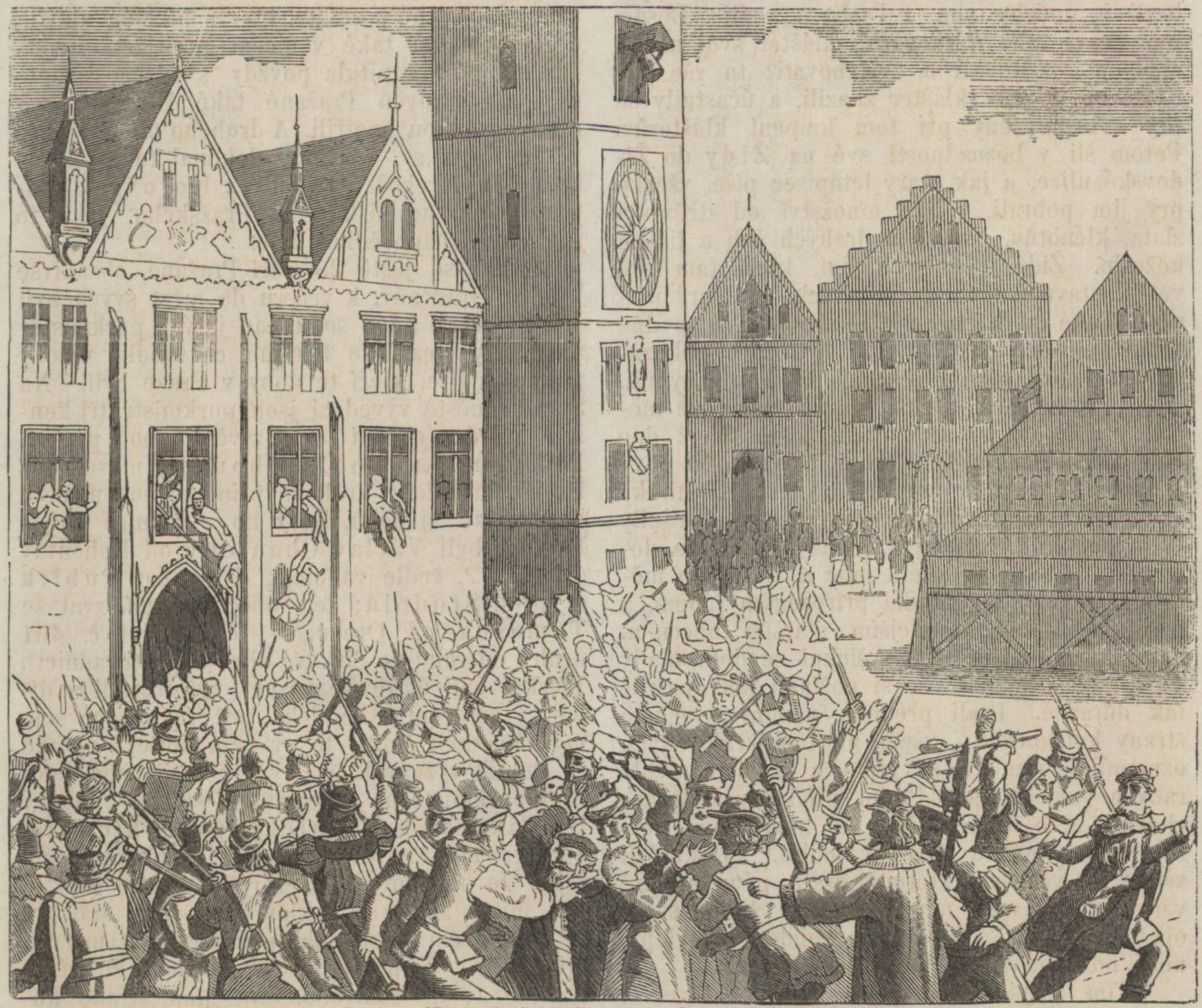
1872 illustration depicting the 1483 defenestrations, from Česko-Moravská Kronika

This defenestration took place on 24 September 1483 during the storms of the Prague population during the reign of King Vladislaus II of Hungary. He was king of Bohemia at that time but he became the ruler of Moravia and Hungary only after Matthias Corvinus died in 1490.

It was then that the party of the Communion under both kinds, fearing for their influence, carried out a violent coup in the Old and New towns and Malá Strana. The Old Town Burgomaster and the dead bodies of seven New Town councilors were defenestrated from the respective town halls. The coup in Prague contributed to the limitation of ruling power and prevented the resumption of pre-Hussite conditions.

On 6 October 1483, three Prague municipalities signed a treaty on unity and common action, which brought the dominion of Utraquism. The development then led to religious reconciliation and the declaration of equality of both churches at the Kutná Hora Assembly in 1485.

== 1618 Defenestration of Prague ==
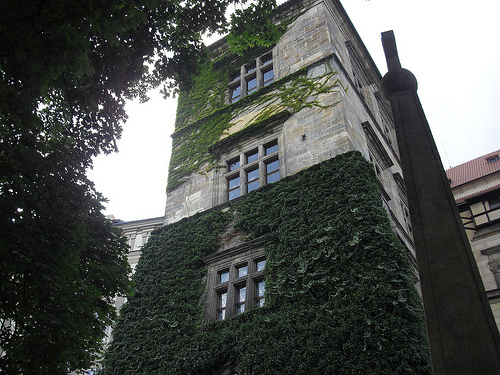
The window (top floor) where the 1618 defenestration occurred. A monument stands to the right of the castle tower.

This defenestration significantly influenced the history of Europe, by causing the Bohemian Estates' Revolt and thus led to the Thirty Years' War.

=== Background ===
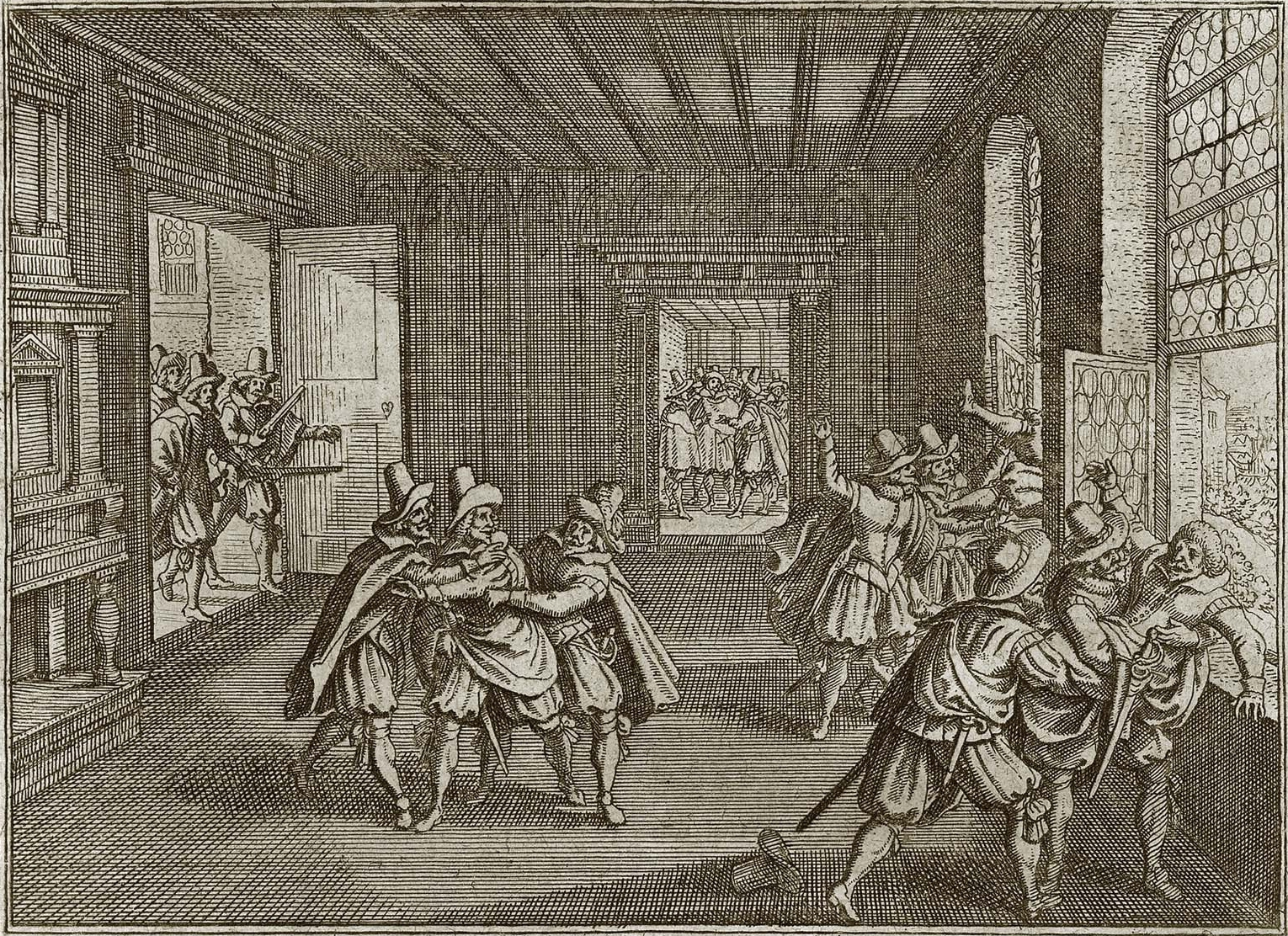
1662 etching of the 1618 event, by engraver Matthäus Merian the Elder for chronicler Johann Philipp Abelin's Theatrum Europaeum

In 1555, the Peace of Augsburg had settled religious disputes in the Holy Roman Empire by enshrining the principle of Cuius regio, eius religio, allowing a prince to determine the religion of his subjects. The Kingdom of Bohemia since 1526 had been governed by Habsburg kings, who did not force their Catholic religion on their largely Protestant subjects. In 1609, Rudolf II, Holy Roman Emperor and King of Bohemia (1576–1612), increased Protestant rights. He was increasingly viewed as unfit to govern, and other members of the Habsburg dynasty declared his younger brother, Matthias, to be family head in 1606. Matthias began to gradually wrest territory from Rudolf, beginning with Hungary.

In 1609, to strengthen his hold on Bohemia, Rudolf issued the Letter of Majesty, which granted Bohemia's largely Protestant estates the right to freely exercise their religion, essentially setting up a Protestant Bohemian state church controlled by the estates, "dominated by the towns and rural nobility".

Upon Rudolf's death, Matthias succeeded in the rule of Bohemia (1612–1619) and extended his offer of more legal and religious concessions to Bohemia, relying mostly on the advice of his chancellor, Bishop Melchior Klesl.

Matthias, already aging, and without children, made his cousin, Ferdinand of Styria, his heir and had him elected king in 1617. Ferdinand was a proponent of the Catholic Counter-Reformation and not likely to be well-disposed to Protestantism or Bohemian freedoms. Bohemian Protestants opposed the royal government as they interpreted the Letter of Majesty to extend not only to the land controlled by the nobility or self-governing towns but also to the king's own lands. Whereas Matthias and Klesl were prepared to appease these demands, Ferdinand was not; in 1618 he forced the Emperor to order the cessation of construction of some Protestant chapels on royal land. When the Bohemian estates protested against this order, Ferdinand had their assembly dissolved.

=== Defenestration ===
On 21 and 22 May 1618, a congress of the Czech evangelical estates was due to meet in Karlin. They had understood this to be their right following a resolution of the provincial assembly from 1609–10 in connection with Rudolf's Letter of Majesty. According to this resolution, the Czech estates had the right to convene a "special consultative assembly" with their defensors to defend their rights. However, this assembly was forbidden by Matthias.

The resolution of 1609–10 provided another option for dispute resolution, a special court composed of half Catholics and half Evangelicals. It was supposed to be 24 respected persons, whose selection was a free choice of each of the disputing parties. However, this special court was not convened.

On Tuesday, May 22, 1618, a meeting of the leaders of the evangelical estates took place in the Smiřických Palace on Lesser Town Square, and it was decided to execute the defenestration the following day.

On 23 May 1618, four Catholic lords regent, Count Jaroslav Bořita of Martinice, Count Vilem Slavata of Chlum, Adam II von Šternberk (the supreme burgrave), and Matouš Děpolt of Lobkovice (the grand prior), arrived at the Bohemian Chancellery at 8:30 am. After preparing the meeting hall, members of the dissolved assembly of the three main Protestant estates gathered at 9:00 am, led by Count Thurn, who had been deprived of his post as castellan (burgrave) of Karlštejn Castle by the Emperor. The Protestant lords' agenda was to clarify whether the four regents present were responsible for persuading the Emperor to order the cessation of Protestant church construction on royal lands.

After a heated debate, both Jaroslav Bořita of Martinice and Vilem Slavata of Chlum were found guilty of "subversion of majesty, enemies of the estates and the common good, and rebels against the Kingdom of Bohemia" and were sentenced to death by being defenestrated from the second floor. These were around 16–20 meters above the ground. The other two members of the provincial government present, i.e. the Supreme Burgrave Adam of Šternberk and Matouš Děpolt of Lobkovice, were escorted in a procession from the Castle to their apartments after the defenestration.

According to the Count of Martinice himself:

Lord Paul Rziczan read aloud ... a letter with the following approximate content: His Imperial Majesty had sent to their graces the lord regents a sharp letter that was, by our request, issued to us as a copy after the original had been read aloud, and in which His Majesty declared all of our lives and honour already forfeit, thereby greatly frightening all three Protestant estates. As they also absolutely intended to proceed with the execution against us, we came to a unanimous agreement among ourselves that, regardless of any loss of life and limb, honour and property, we would stand firm, with all for one and one for all ... nor would we be subservient, but rather we would loyally help and protect each other to the utmost, against all difficulties. Because, however, it is clear that such a letter came about through the advice of some of our religious enemies, we wish to know, and hereby ask the lord regents present, if all or some of them knew of the letter, recommended it, and approved of it.

When giving the verdict Paul Rziczan announced:

Since the estates are truly convinced that both gentlemen should be considered as disturbers of the Majesty , they therefore declare them to be enemies of themselves and the common good, as well as rebels against the Kingdom of Bohemia in general.

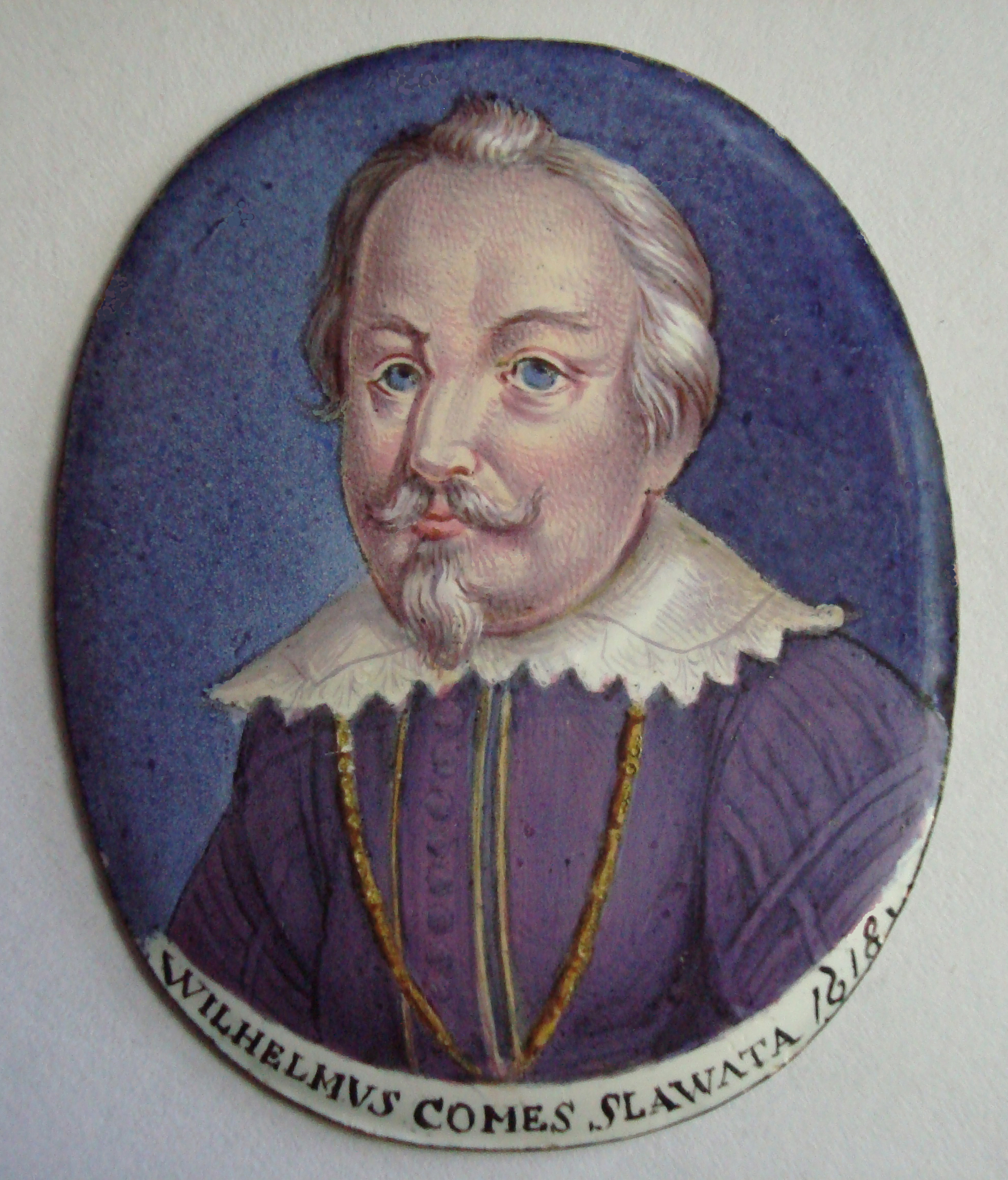
Vilém Slavata of Chlum, 1618 enamel on copper, by a follower of Dominicus Custos

Before the regents gave any answer, they requested that the Protestants give them the opportunity to confer with their superior, Adam von Waldstein, who was not present. If they were given the opportunity, the Protestants were to receive an official answer to their grievance by the next Friday (the encounter took place on the eve of Ascension Day, and they all had to observe the holy day). The Protestant lords, however, demanded an immediate answer. Two regents, Adam II von Sternberg and Matthew Leopold Popel Lobkowitz, were declared innocent by the Protestant Estate holders, deemed to be too pious to have any responsibility in the preparation of the Emperor's letter. They were removed from the room; before leaving, Adam II von Sternberg made it clear that they "did not advise anything that was contrary to the Letter of Majesty". This left Count Vilém Slavata of Chlum and Count Jaroslav Bořita of Martinice (who had replaced Thurn as castellan), both known Catholic hard-liners, and Philip Fabricius, the secretary to the regents. They eventually acknowledged responsibility for the letter and, presuming they would only be arrested, welcomed any punishment the Protestants had planned.

Count von Thurn turned to both Martinice and Slavata and said, "You are enemies of us and of our religion, have desired to deprive us of our Letter of Majesty, have horribly plagued your Protestant subjects ... and have tried to force them to adopt your religion against their wills or have had them expelled for this reason." Then to the crowd of Protestants, he continued, "Were we to keep these men alive, then we would lose the Letter of Majesty and our religion ... for there can be no justice to be gained from or by them".

Shortly thereafter, the two regents and their secretary were defenestrated, but they survived the 70-foot (21-metre) fall from the third floor. Catholics maintained the men were saved by angels or by the intercession of the Virgin Mary, who caught them; later Protestant pamphleteers asserted that they survived due to falling onto a dung heap, a story unknown to contemporaries and probably coined in response to divine intervention claims.

Philip Fabricius was later ennobled by the Emperor and granted the title Baron von Hohenfall (literally 'Baron of Highfall').

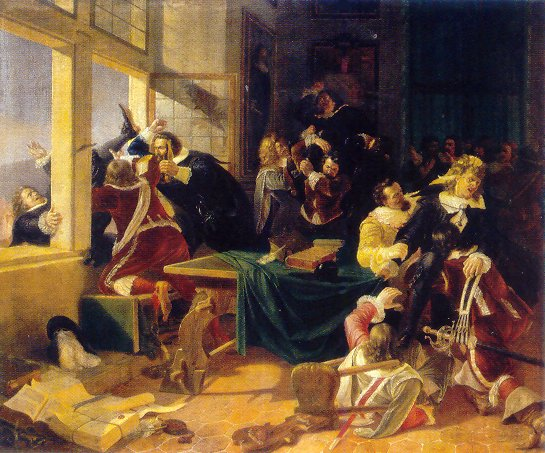
1844 illustration by Czech-Austrian painter Karel Svoboda

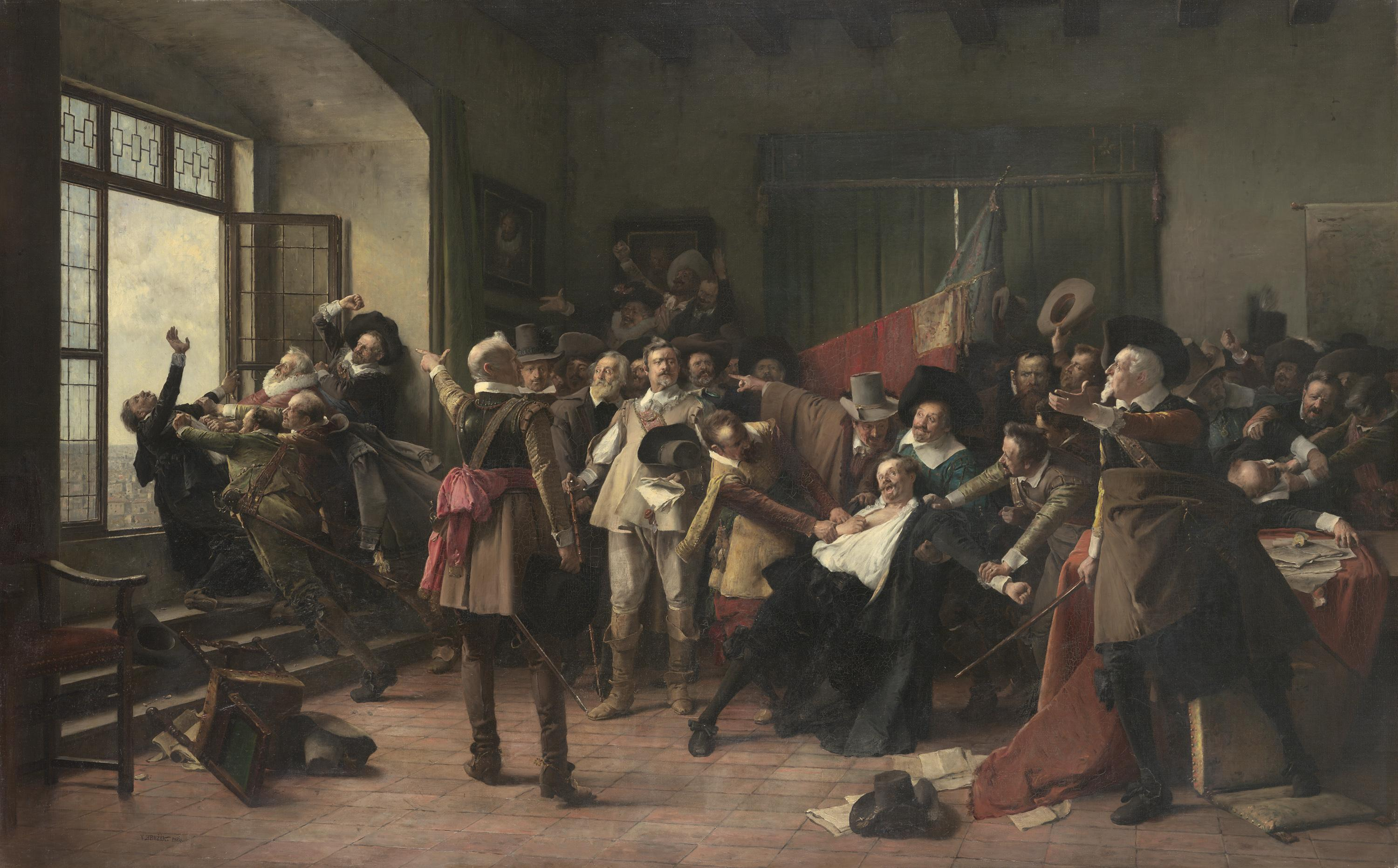
Pražská defenestrace roku 1618 by Czech painter Václav Brožík, 1890

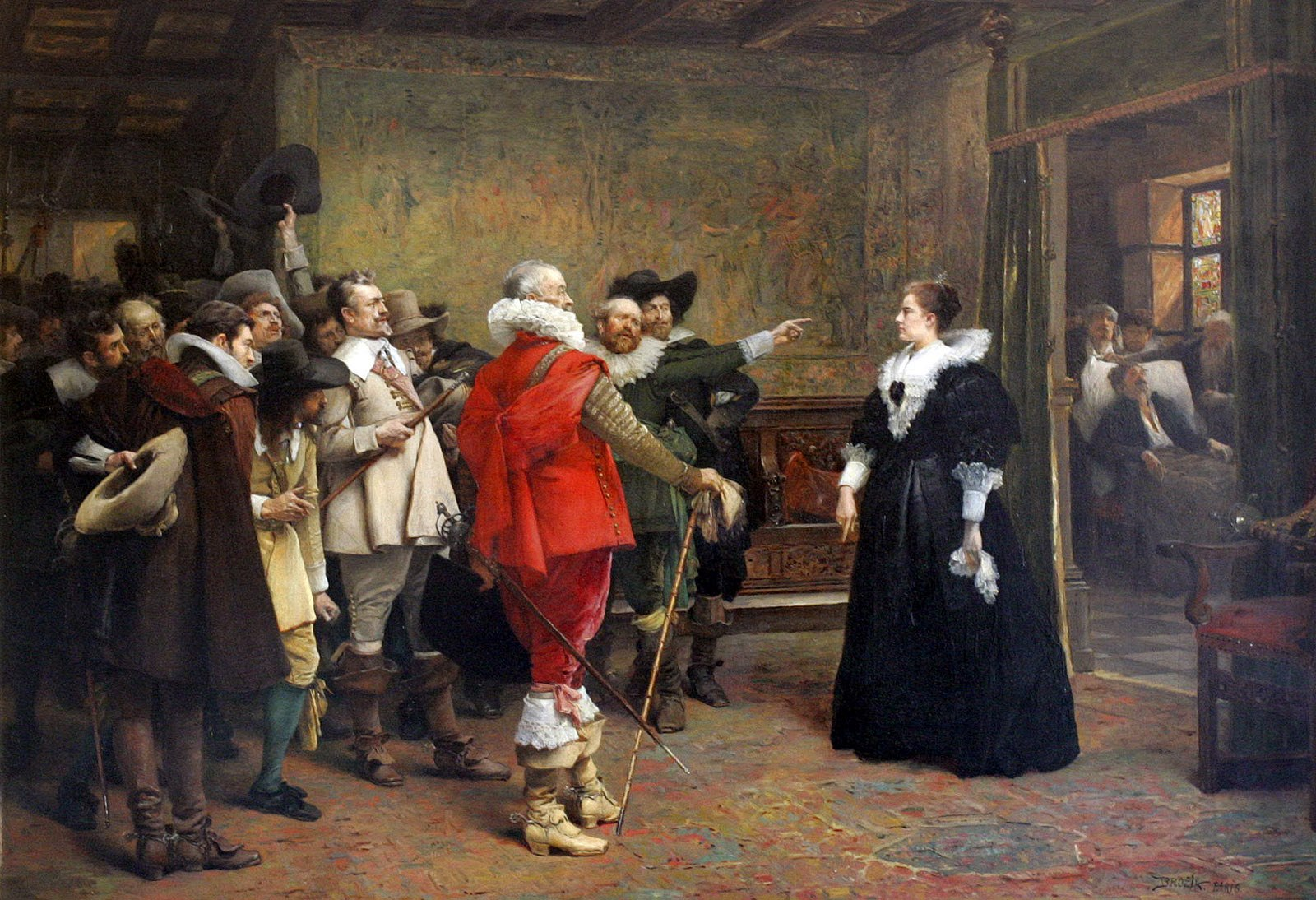
Polyxena of Lobkowitz safeguarding royal officials Slavata and Martinic, thrown out of windows of the royal castle in Prague in 1618, by Brožík, c. 1880–1891

=== Aftermath ===
Immediately after the defenestration, the Protestant estates and Catholic Habsburgs started gathering allies for war. After the death of Matthias in 1619, Ferdinand II was elected Holy Roman Emperor. At the same time, the Bohemian estates deposed him as King of Bohemia and replaced him with Frederick V, Elector Palatine, a leading Calvinist and son-in-law of the Protestant James VI and I, King of Scotland, England and Ireland.

Because they had deposed a properly chosen king, who also happened to be emperor, the Protestants could not gather the international support they needed for war. Just two years after the defenestration, Ferdinand and the Catholics regained power in the Battle of White Mountain on November 8, 1620. This became known as the first battle in the Thirty Years' War.

There was plundering and pillaging in Prague for weeks following the battle. Several months later, twenty-seven nobles and citizens were tortured and executed in the Old Town Square. Twelve heads were impaled on iron hooks and hung from the Old Town Bridge Tower as a warning. This contributed to the resentment that gave rise to the Thirty Years' War.

== Further defenestrations ==
More events of defenestration have occurred in Prague during its history, but they are not usually called "defenestrations of Prague".

Sometimes, the name "the fourth" or "the third defenestration of Prague" is used, although it has no standard meaning. For example, it has been used to describe the death of Jan Masaryk, who was found below the bathroom window of the building of the Czechoslovak Ministry of Foreign Affairs on 10 March 1948, two weeks after the communist coup. The official report listed the death as a suicide. However, it was widely believed he was murdered, either by the nascent communist government in which he served as a non-partisan foreign minister, or by the Soviet secret services. A Prague police report in 2004 concluded after forensic research that at least one other person was involved in Masaryk's death. This report was seemingly corroborated in 2006 when a Russian journalist said that his mother knew the Russian intelligence officer who defenestrated Masaryk. However, a more recent investigation opened in 2019 again called those findings into question, with new research claiming that Masaryk fell not from the bathroom window, but from the adjacent exterior ledge. That investigation was shelved in 2021, with investigators citing a continuing lack of sufficient evidence to make conclusive determinations regarding the events of Masaryk's death.

== Sources ==
- Henry Frederick Schwarz, The Imperial Privy Council in the Seventeenth Century (Cambridge, Mass.: Harvard University Press, 1943, issued as volume LIII of Harvard Historical Studies), pp. 344–347 (it contains an English translation of part of Slavata's report of the incident is printed in).
