= Hieronymus Schlick =

Bohemian count

Hieronymus Schlick was a Bohemian count who authorised the minting of Joachimsthalers, after Joachimsthal, the valley in which the silver was mined. Joachimsthalers was later shortened to thaler, the origin of the word "dollar".

In 1516, a silver deposit was discovered near the home of Hieronymus Schlick. By 1519, Schlick started minting silver coins in his castle without official sanction, and on January 1, 1520, he received official approval to operate a mint. It was probably more profitable for him to mint silver into coins rather than just selling the silver. Between 1534 and 1536, King Ferdinand I ordered the construction of an imperial mint in Jachymov, and the building that housed the imperial mint served as a museum until as late as 1976.
