= Vilém Slavata of Chlum =

Czech nobleman (1572–1652)

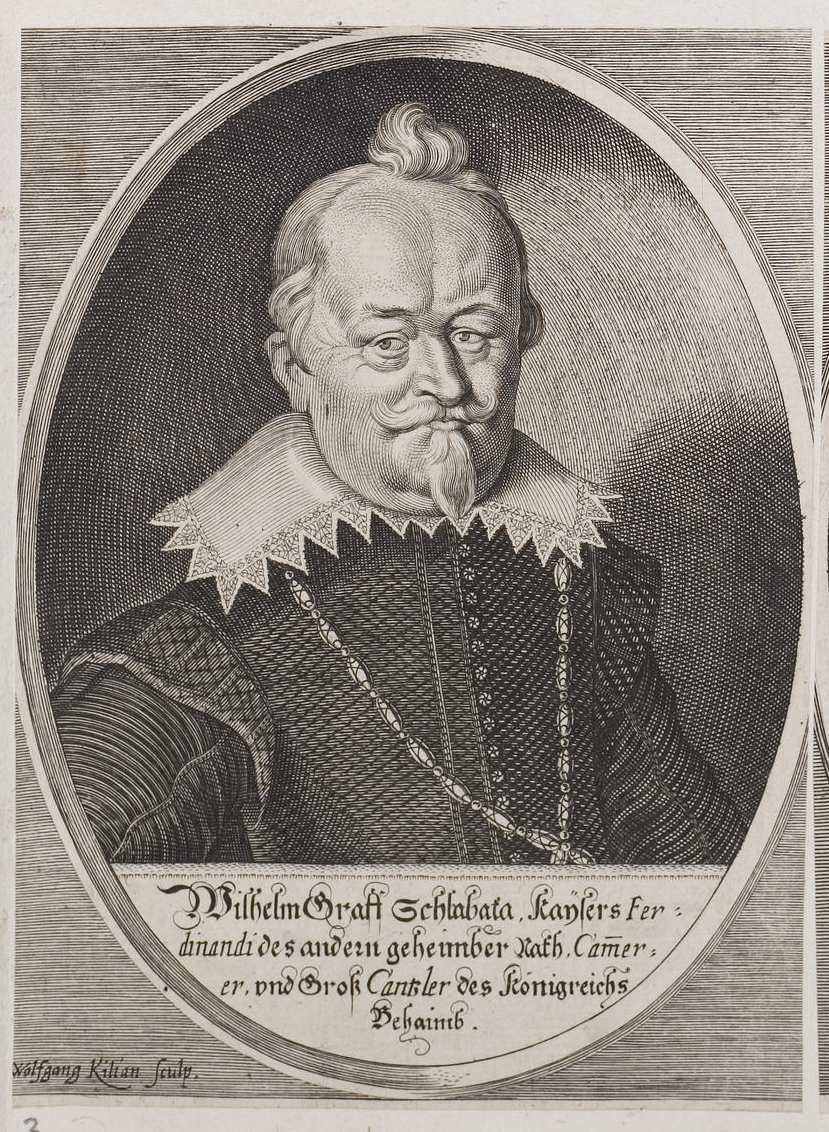
Wilhelm Graff Schlabata, Kaysers Ferdinandi des andern geheimber Rath, Cammerer, und Groß Cantzler des Königreichs Behaimb. A contemporary copperplate by Wolfgang Kilian

Vilém Slavata z Chlumu a Košumberka (Czech pronunciation: [ˈvɪlɛːm ˈslavata]; German: Wilhelm Slawata von Chlum und Koschumberg) (1 December 1572 – 19 January 1652) was a Czech nobleman from an old Bohemian family. As viceregent (místodržící) of Emperor Ferdinand II of Habsburg (from 1617) he became famous as co-victim, along with Jaroslav Borzita of Martinice, of the 1618 Defenestration of Prague.

== Life ==
Vilém was born at his family's estates in Čestín near Kutná Hora. His father Adam had been an administrator of Emperor Rudolf II of Habsburg, who in 1583 had taken up his residence at Prague Castle and had guaranteed freedom of religion to the Protestant Bohemian estates by his Letter of Majesty (Rudolfův Majestát) issued in 1609. Though he was raised in the spirit of the Unity of the Brethren, Slavata converted to Catholicism in 1597 and became a fierce advocate of the older faith.

Like his father he took service with Rudolf II who appointed him burgrave at Karlštejn. Under Rudolf's successor Matthias he became chamberlain of the Crown of Bohemia. Vilém supported the coronation of the devout Catholic Ferdinand of Inner Austria as Bohemian king against the resistance of the Protestant estates. In return Ferdinand vested him with the office of his representative at Prague, where he had to face the violent uprising of the nobles led by Jindřich Matyáš Thurn on 23 May 1618. Together with J. Bořita of Martinice he was thrown out of a window of the castle by an enraged Protestant multitude. He was subsequently arrested by the assailants after surviving the defenestration albeit with severe injuries.

One year later, he managed to escape to Saxony. However, Elector John George I, anxious for his neutral position, forced him to retire to Passau. After Ferdinand's victory at the Battle of White Mountain in 1620, Slavata returned to Bohemia. A leading figure in restoring Catholicism, he received the title of a Reichsgraf ("Count of the Empire") and in 1628 was appointed High Chancellor of Bohemia. He died at Jindřichův Hradec.

== Works ==
- Historické spisování ("Historical writings"), 1637–1651

This monumental (14 large-scale books) reminiscence in which Vilém comprehensively describes the causes and initiation of the Bohemian Revolt and the first phase of the Thirty Years' War, has importance for understanding of that era. His great annals are focused especially on the events of the years 1608–1619 on the territory of the Czech lands.
