= Jaroslav Bořita of Martinice =

Czech nobleman (1582–1649)

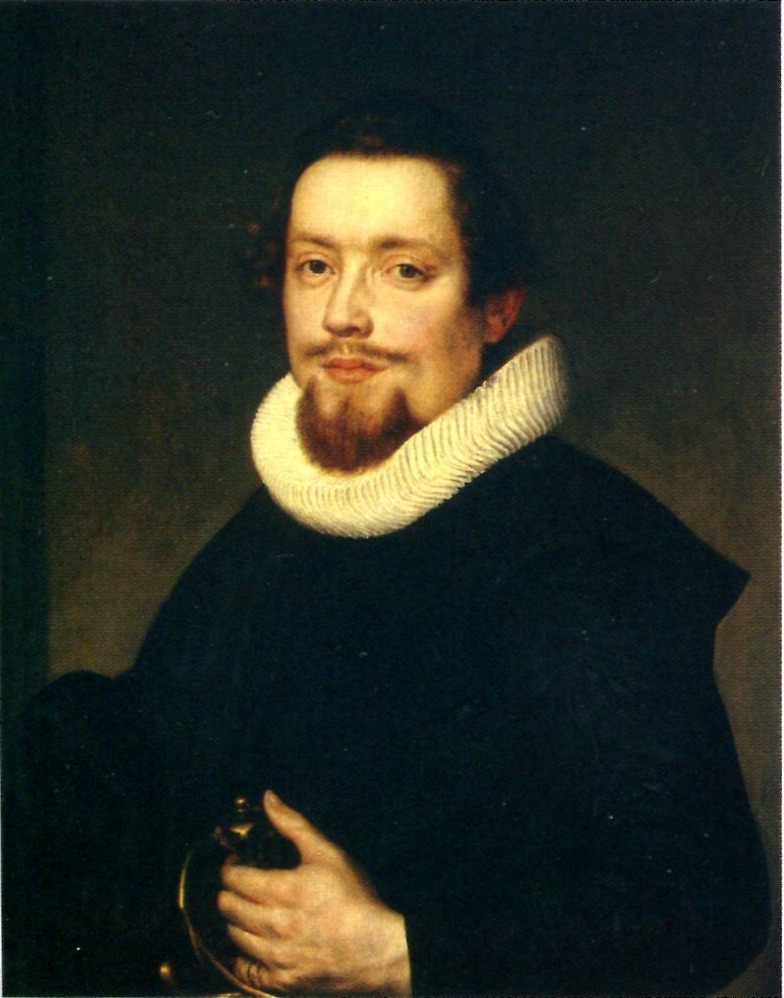
Count Jaroslav Bořita of Martinice

Count Jaroslav Bořita of Martinice (Czech pronunciation: [ˈjaroslav ˈbor̝ɪta]; Czech: Jaroslav hrabě Bořita z Martinic, German: Jaroslav Graf Borzita von Martinic/Martinitz) (6 January 1582 – 21 November 1649) was a nobleman from Bohemia. He was a representative of Emperor Ferdinand II who, along with Vilém Slavata of Chlum, was a victim in the 1618 Defenestration of Prague (also known as the Second Defenestration of Prague). In 1621 he became Bohemian Count and in 1622 he became Royal Statholder of Bohemia and Supreme Burgrave of Bohemia in 1638.

== Personal life ==
Jaroslav was a member of the Martinic noble family. He was married 4 times. First time he married Maria Eusebie von Sternberg (1584–1634), second time he married Countess Eliška Marie of Vrtba (died in 1643), third time to Kateřina Lidmila Talackovna of Ještětice (died in 1649) and fourth time to Helena Barbora Kostomlatská of Vřesovice (died in 1682). He had 10 children, all by his first marriage. His eldest daughter was Countess Barbora Eusebie (d. 1656), second wife of Margrave Christian William of Brandenburg.

== See also ==
- Thirty Years' War
- Defenestrations of Prague
