= Letter of Majesty =

1609 statute by Holy Roman Emperor Rudolf II on religious tolerance in Bohemia

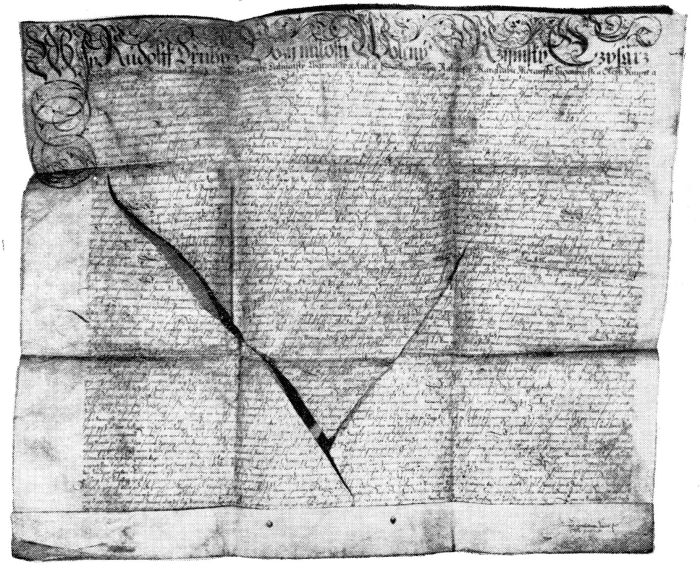

The Letter of Majesty (1609) was a 17th-century European document, reluctantly signed by Rudolf II in his capacity as king of Bohemia, granting religious tolerance to both Protestant and Catholic citizens living in the estates of Bohemia. The letter also created a Bohemian Protestant State Church, run by said estates. A similar Letter was issued for Silesia, a part of the Lands of the Bohemian Crown.

In 1611, Rudolf inexplicably permitted his cousin Archduke Leopold to invade Bohemia with some 7,000 troops. A considerable Bohemian force drove Leopold back from the suburbs of Prague, and the Bohemian Estates called upon Matthias to take over the government of their kingdom.

Following the Bohemian Revolt, Ferdinand II, Holy Roman Emperor revoked the Letter of Majesty, going as far as to personally tear up the original document.
