= 1621 =

1621 in various calendars
- Gregorian calendar: 1621; MDCXXI
- Ab urbe condita: 2374
- Armenian calendar: 1070; ԹՎ ՌՀ
- Assyrian calendar: 6371
- Balinese saka calendar: 1542–1543
- Bengali calendar: 1027–1028
- Berber calendar: 2571
- English Regnal year: 18 Ja. 1 – 19 Ja. 1
- Buddhist calendar: 2165
- Burmese calendar: 983
- Byzantine calendar: 7129–7130
- Chinese calendar: 庚申年 (Metal Monkey); 4318 or 4111 — to — 辛酉年 (Metal Rooster); 4319 or 4112
- Coptic calendar: 1337–1338
- Discordian calendar: 2787
- Ethiopian calendar: 1613–1614
- Hebrew calendar: 5381–5382
- Hindu calendars
- Vikram Samvat: 1677–1678
- Shaka Samvat: 1542–1543
- Kali Yuga: 4721–4722
- Holocene calendar: 11621
- Igbo calendar: 621–622
- Iranian calendar: 999–1000
- Islamic calendar: 1030–1031
- Japanese calendar: Genna 7 (元和７年)
- Javanese calendar: 1542–1543
- Julian calendar: Gregorian minus 10 days
- Korean calendar: 3954
- Minguo calendar: 291 before ROC 民前291年
- Nanakshahi calendar: 153
- Thai solar calendar: 2163–2164
- Tibetan calendar: ལྕགས་ཕོ་སྤྲེ་ལོ་ (male Iron-Monkey); 1747 or 1366 or 594 — to — ལྕགས་མོ་བྱ་ལོ་ (female Iron-Bird); 1748 or 1367 or 595

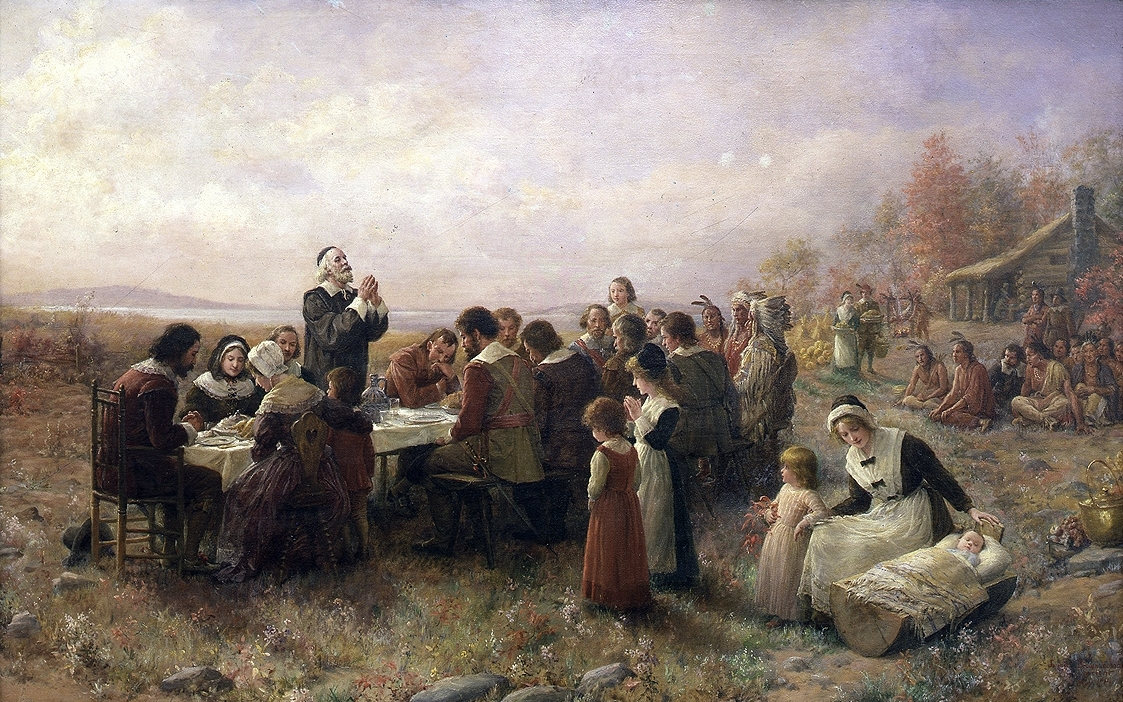
September 29: The First Thanksgiving the New World as imagined by Jennie A. Brownscombe in 1914

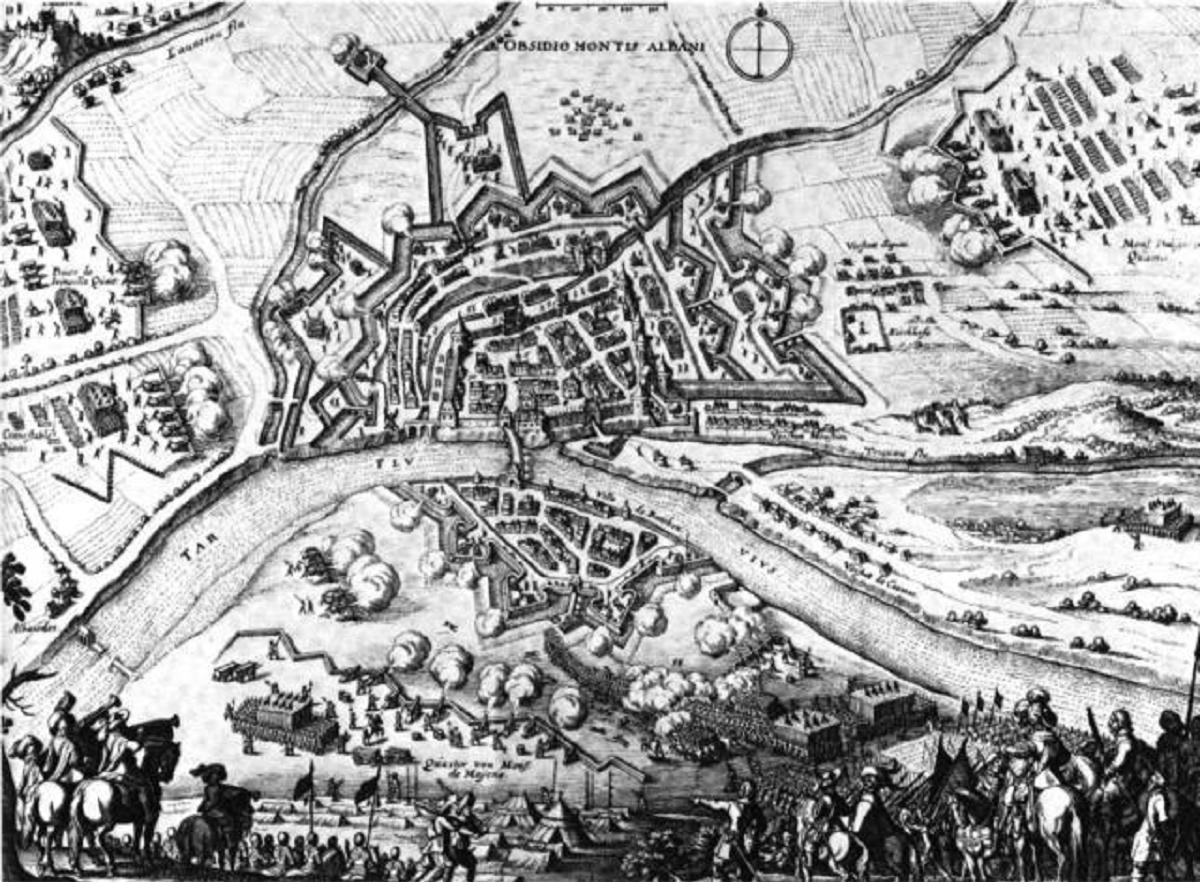
The Siege of Montauban.

1621 (MDCXXI) was a common year starting on Friday of the Gregorian calendar and a common year starting on Monday of the Julian calendar, the 1621st year of the Common Era (CE) and Anno Domini (AD) designations, the 621st year of the 2nd millennium, the 21st year of the 17th century, and the 2nd year of the 1620s decade. As of the start of 1621, the Gregorian calendar was 10 days ahead of the Julian calendar, which remained in localized use until 1923.

== Events ==
=== January–March ===
- January 12 – Şehzade Mehmed, the 15-year old half-brother of Ottoman Sultan Osman II, is put to death by hanging on Osman's orders. Before dying, Mehmed prays aloud that Osman's reign as Sultan be ruined.
- January 18 – The Dutch East India Company formally names its fortress at Jayakarta in Indonesia, calling it Batavia. Upon the independence of the Dutch East Indies as Indonesia in 1945, Batavia will be renamed Jakarta.
- January 22 – The Tianqi era begins in Ming Dynasty China, six months after Zhu Changluo becomes the Taichang Emperor.
- January 24 – Twelve days after the murder of Prince Mehmed on orders of Sultan Osman II, Constantinople is hit by bitter winter weather, leading to rioting by persons who believe that the punishment of Osman is the will of Allah.
- January 28 – Pope Paul V (Camillo Borghese) dies at the age of 70 after 15 years as Pontiff.
- January 29 – Ferdinand II, Holy Roman Emperor, declares the Elector of the Palatinate, Frederick V, to be a traitor to the Empire.
- February 9 – Papal Conclave of 1621: Pope Gregory XV succeeds Pope Paul V, as the 234th pope.
- February 17 – Myles Standish is appointed as the first commander of Plymouth Colony.
- March 16 – Samoset, a Mohegan, visits the settlers of Plymouth Colony and greets them: "Welcome, Englishmen! My name is Samoset."
- March 22 – The Pilgrims of Plymouth Colony sign a peace treaty with Massasoit of the Wampanoags.
- March 31 – King Philip IV of Spain begins his 44-year rule.

=== April–June ===
- April 1 – The Plymouth, Massachusetts colonists create the first treaty with native Americans.
- April 5 – The Mayflower sets sail from Plymouth, on a return trip to England.
- April 9 – The Twelve Years' Truce between the Dutch Republic and the Spanish Empire expires, and both sides prepare to resume the Eighty Years' War.
- May 2 – The Panama earthquake affects the Isthmus of Panama, with an estimated magnitude of 6.9, and a maximum Mercalli intensity of VII.
- May 12 – The city of Tornio in Lapland is founded by King Gustavus Adolphus of Sweden, becoming the northernmost city in the world at the time.
- May 24 – The Protestant Union is formally dissolved.
- June 3 – The Dutch West India Company is founded.
- June 21 – Thirty Years' War: Twenty-seven Czech lords are executed on the Old Town Square in Prague, as a consequence of the Battle of White Mountain.
- June 24 – Huguenot rebellions: Saint-Jean-d'Angély is taken, after a 26-day siege by Royal forces.

=== July–September ===
- July 25 – Thirty Years' War – Battle of Neu Titschein: Remnants of the Bohemian army temporarily hold off the Imperial advance in Silesia.
- August 8 – Huguenot rebellions: The French Protestant city of La Rochelle joins in the revolt by Benjamin, Duke of Soubise.
- August 22 – Huguenot rebellions: Louis XIII besieges the city of Montauban, but is forced to abandon the battle by November 9.
- September 2 – The Battle of Khotyn begins as a force of more than 120,000 Ottoman troops attacks the Moldavian city of Khotyn. Despite the Ottomans' numerical superiority, the Polish-Lithuanian Commonwealth wins the battle and forces a surrender five weeks later.

=== October–December ===
- October 9 – The Treaty of Khotyn is signed between the Ottoman Empire and the Polish–Lithuanian Commonwealth, ending the First Polish-Ottoman War.
- October 9 (September 29 O.S.) – The Pilgrims of Plymouth Colony and Wampanoags celebrate a harvest feast (three days), later regarded as the First Thanksgiving, noted for the temporary peace between the English and the local Indians. The celebration is believed by later historians to have coincided with Michaelmas, observed on September 29 by the Anglican Communion on the calendar used in England at the time.
- November 11 – The ship Fortune arrives at Plymouth Colony, with 35 more settlers.
- December 31 – Thirty Years' War: The Peace of Nikolsburg is signed between Ferdinand II, Holy Roman Emperor and Gabor Bethlen, Prince of Transylvania. Bethlen agrees to renounce his claims to Hungary. In return Bethlen receives several counties and lands along the eastern border of the Holy Roman Empire, and Moravia is granted religious freedom.
- December – The Dutch mathematician and astronomer, Willebrord Snel van Royen (1580–1626), reveals he has rediscovered the law of refraction, also known as Snellius' law.

=== Date unknown ===
- The Venezuelan city of Petare is founded by Spanish conquistadors, as San Jose de Guanarito.
- The Swedish city of Gothenburg is founded by King Gustavus Adolphus of Sweden. The king also grants city rights to Luleå, Piteå and Torneå (Tornio). Riga falls under the rule of Sweden.
- Tamblot rallies an unknown, large number of people in Bohol, Captaincy General of the Philippines to revolt against the Spanish Empire.
- The Dutch East India Company sends 2,000 soldiers, under the command of Jan Pieterszoon Coen, to the Banda Islands, in order to force the local inhabitants to accept the Dutch trade monopoly on the lucrative nutmeg, grown almost exclusively on those islands. The soldiers proceed to massacre most of the 15,000 indigenous inhabitants.

== Births ==
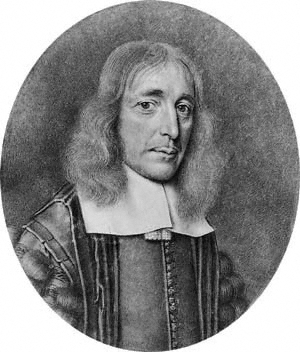
Thomas Willis

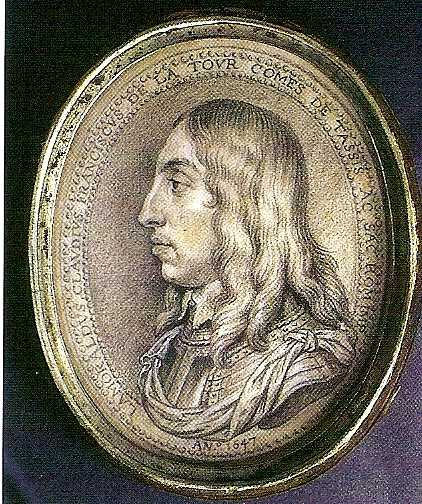
Lamoral II Claudius Franz, Count of Thurn and Taxis

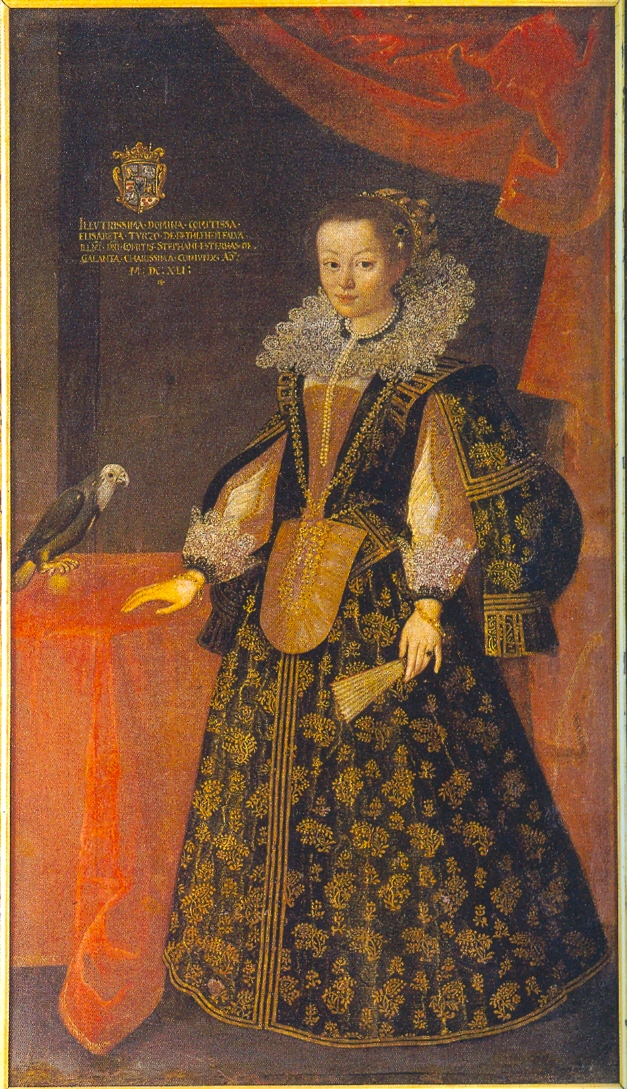
Erzsébet Thurzó

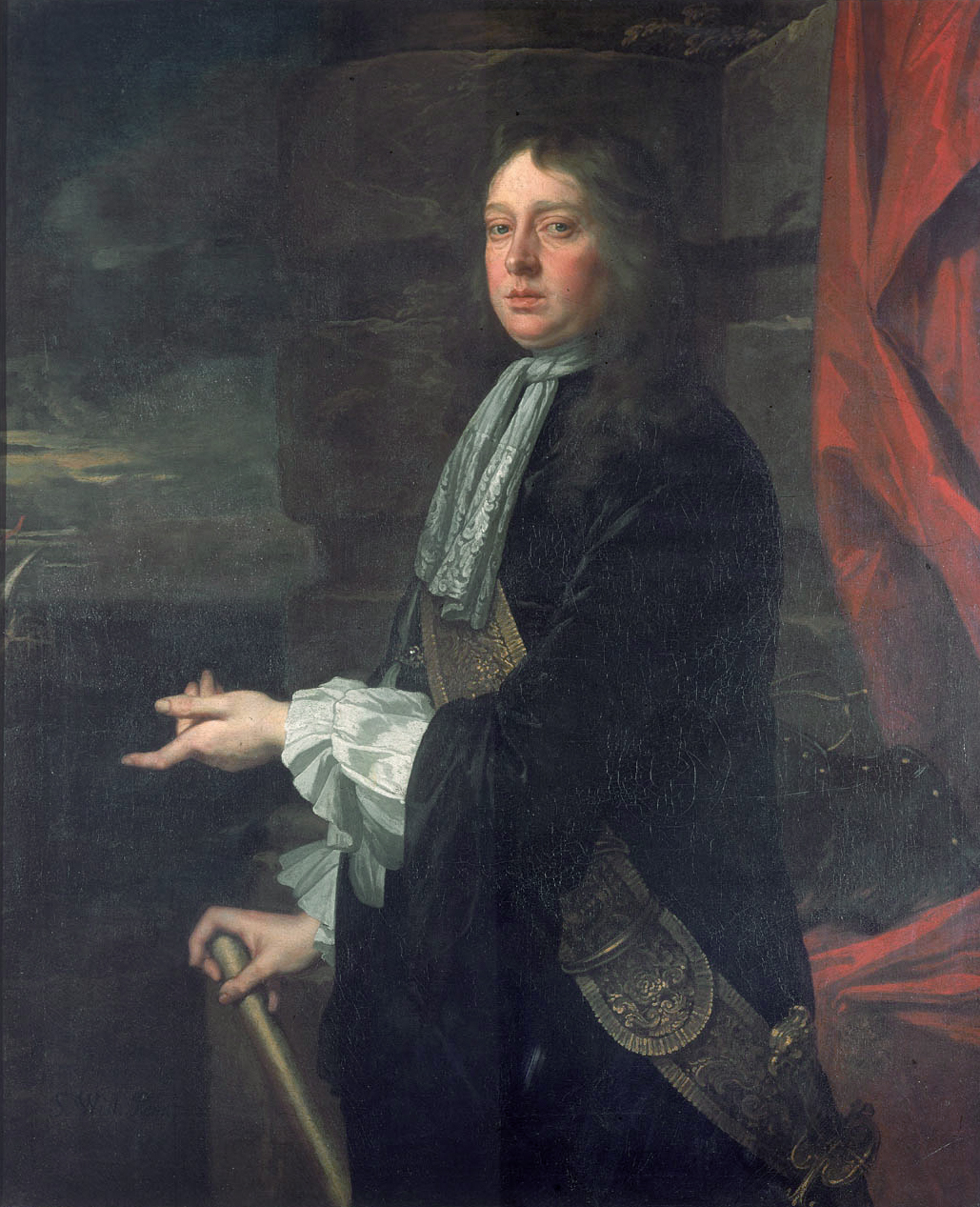
William Penn

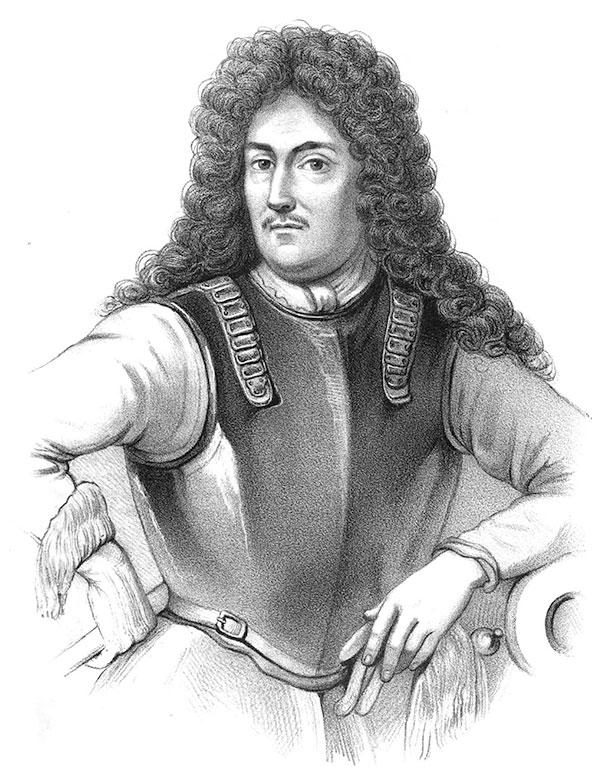
Rutger von Ascheberg born 2 June

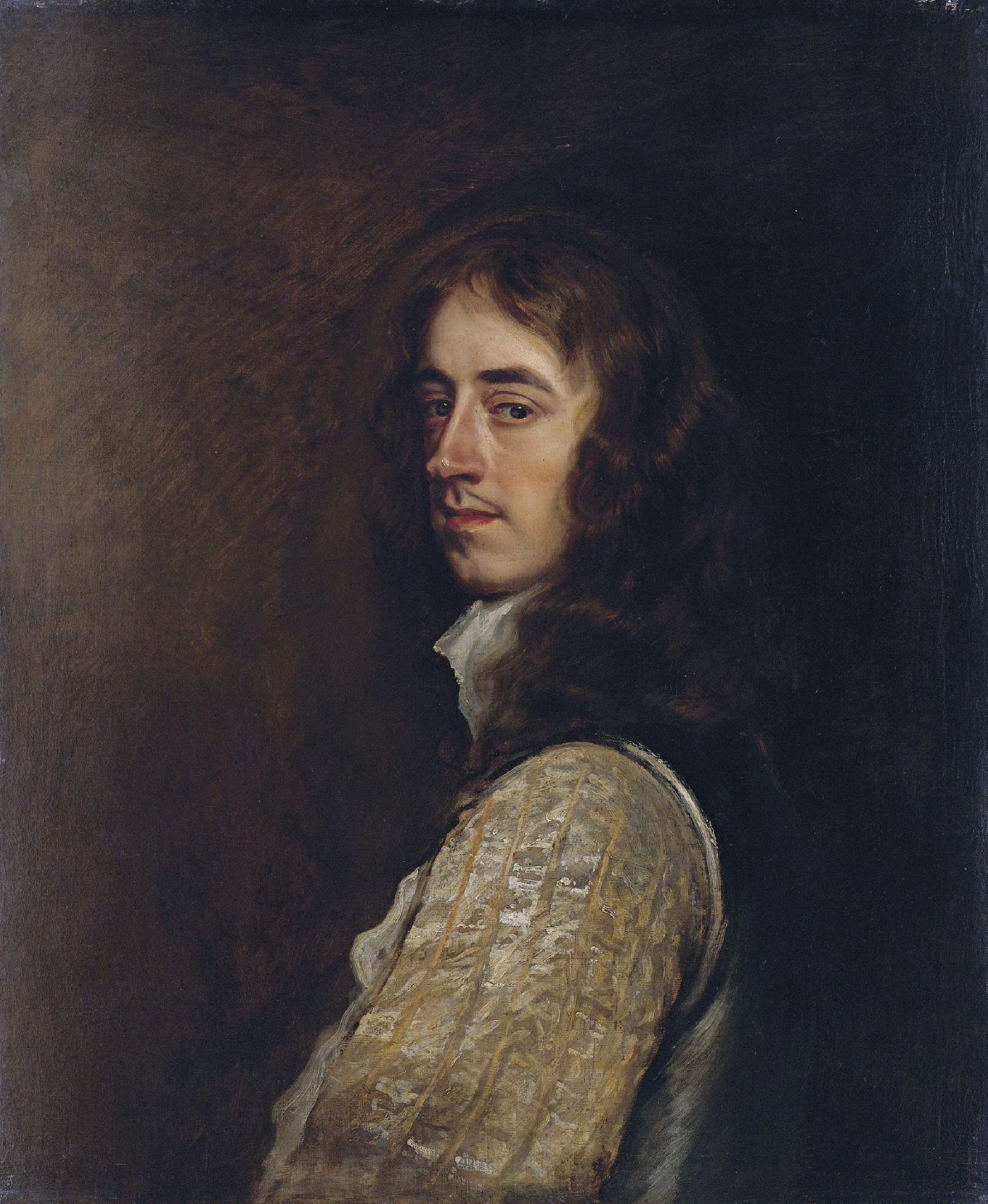
Edward Proger

=== January–March ===
- January 16 – Magnus Celsius, Swedish astronomer and mathematician (d. 1679)
- January 27 – Thomas Willis, English doctor who played an important part in the history of anatomy (d. 1675)
- January 30 – George II Rákóczi, Hungarian nobleman (d. 1660)
- February 2 – Johannes Schefferus, Alsatian-born humanist (d. 1679)
- February 4 – Frederick, Burgrave of Dohna, Dutch officer, and governor of Orange (d. 1688)
- February 14 – Sibylla Schwarz, German poet (d. 1638)
- February 20 – Erzsébet Thurzó, Hungarian noblewoman (d. 1642)
- February 21 – Rebecca Nurse, Massachusetts colonist, executed as a witch (d. 1692)
- February – Lamoral II Claudius Franz, Count of Thurn and Taxis, Postmaster General of the Holy Roman Empire (1646–1676) (d. 1676)
- March 1 – John Alleyn, Cornish barrister (d. 1663)
- March 2 – Louis Günther II, Count of Schwarzburg-Ebeleben (1642–1681) (d. 1681)
- March 9 – Egbert van der Poel, Dutch painter (d. 1664)
- March 16 – Georg Neumark, German poet and composer of hymns (d. 1681)
- March 24 – John VI, Prince of Anhalt-Zerbst (1621–1667) (d. 1667)
- March 26 (bapt.) – Jacob van der Ulft, Dutch painter (d. 1689)
- March 27 – Margrave Charles Magnus of Baden-Durlach (d. 1658)
- March 28 – Heinrich Schwemmer, German music teacher and composer (d. 1696)
- March 31 – Andrew Marvell, English metaphysical poet and politician (d. 1678)

=== April–June ===
- April 1 – Guru Tegh Bahadur, 9th Sikh Guru (d. 1675)
- April 7 – Crato, Count of Nassau-Saarbrücken (1640–1642) (d. 1642)
- April 17
  - Henry Vaughan, Welsh author (d. 1695)
  - Thomas Vaughan, Welsh philosopher (d. 1666)
- April 23
  - Georg Arnold, Austrian musician (d. 1676)
  - William Penn, English admiral and politician (d. 1670)
- April 25 – Roger Boyle, 1st Earl of Orrery, Anglo-Irish soldier, statesman and dramatist (d. 1679)
- May 25 – David Beck, Dutch portrait painter (d. 1656)
- June 2
  - Rutger von Ascheberg, Courland-born soldier in Swedish service (d. 1693)
  - Jørgen Bjelke, Norwegian officer and nobleman (d. 1696)
  - Isaac van Ostade, Dutch painter (d. 1649)
- June 6 – Petar Zrinski, Croatian viceroy (executed 1671)
- June 16 – Edward Proger, Member of Parliament for Brecknockshire (d. 1713)
- June 29 – Willem van der Zaan, Dutch admiral (d. 1669)

=== July–September ===
- July 1 – Cornelis de Man, Dutch painter (d. 1706)
- July 8
  - Jean de La Fontaine, French writer (d. 1695)
  - Leonora Christina Ulfeldt, Danish countess and author (d. 1698)
- July 13
  - Last baby beaver born on Exmoor until July 13, 2021
- July 22
  - Anthony Ashley Cooper, 1st Earl of Shaftesbury, English politician (d. 1683)
  - Thomas Hanford, New England settler, Puritan minister (d. 1693)
  - Kinoshita Jun'an, Japanese philosopher and Confucian scholar (d. 1699)
- July 24 – Jan Andrzej Morsztyn, Polish poet (d. 1693)
- August 12 – Albert d'Orville, Jesuit priest and missionary, cartographer (d. 1662)
- August 13
  - Sir John Pakington, 2nd Baronet, English politician (d. 1680)
  - Israel Silvestre, French topographical etcher (d. 1691)
- August 19 – Gerbrand van den Eeckhout, Dutch painter (d. 1674)
- August 22 – Adriaen van Gaesbeeck, Dutch painter of genre subjects and portraits (d. 1650)
- August 28 – Sir Richard Howe, 2nd Baronet, English Member of Parliament (d. 1703)
- September 8 – Louis, Grand Condé, French general (d. 1686)
- September 9 – Henry X, Count of Reuss-Lobenstein, Rector of the University of Leipzig (d. 1671)

=== October–December ===
- October 3
  - Claude Maltret, French Jesuit (d. 1674)
  - Friedrich Werner, German musician (d. 1660)
- October 8 – Maximilian Henry of Bavaria, Roman Catholic bishop (d. 1688)
- October 18 – Michael Angelo Immenraet, Flemish painter (d. 1683)
- October 20 – Şehzade Ömer, Ottoman prince (d. 1622)
- October 21
  - Nicholas Barré, French Minim friar, priest and founder (d. 1686)
  - Richard Standish, English politician (d. 1662)
- October 23 – Lord John Stewart, Scottish aristocrat, Royalist commander in the English Civil War (d. 1644)
- October 24 – Serafina of God, founder of seven Carmelite monasteries of nuns in southern Italy (d. 1699)
- October 29 – The London Pageant of 1621 celebrates the inauguration of Edward Barkham (Lord Mayor).
- November 11 – Israel Tonge, English churchman and anti-Catholic conspirator (d. 1680)
- November 15
  - Cornelis Geelvinck, Dutch mayor (d. 1689)
  - Henry Mordaunt, 2nd Earl of Peterborough, English diplomat (d. 1697)
- December 3 – Bohuslav Balbín, Czech writer and Jesuit (d. 1688)
- December 10 – Christian Albert, Burgrave and Count of Dohna, German nobleman and general in the army of Brandenburg (d. 1677)
- December 12 – Gerard Pietersz Hulft, Dutch general (d. 1656)
- December 23
  - Heneage Finch, 1st Earl of Nottingham, English politician (d. 1682)
  - Edmund Berry Godfrey, English magistrate whose mysterious death caused anti-Catholic uproar in England (d. 1678)

=== Approximate date ===
- Richard Allestree, English churchman and provost of Eton College (d. 1681)

== Deaths ==
=== January–March ===
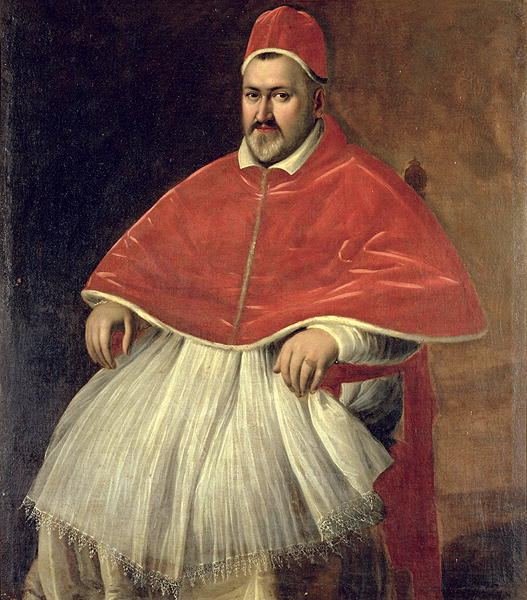
Pope Paul V

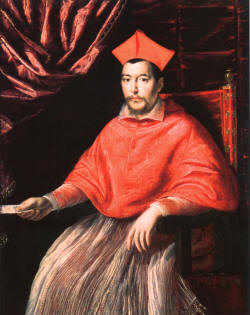
Pietro Aldobrandini

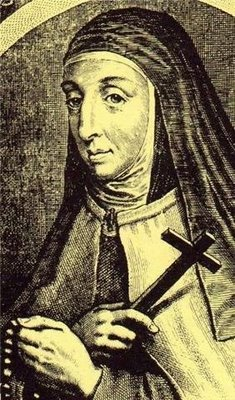
Servant of God Ana de Jesús

- January 15 – Christopher Pickering, British politician (b. 1556)
- January 28 – Pope Paul V (b. 1552)
- January 29 – Francis Taylor, Mayor of Dublin, Ireland (b. c. 1550)
- February 10 – Pietro Aldobrandini, Italian cardinal, patron of the arts (b. 1571)
- February 15 – Michael Praetorius, German composer (b. 1571)
- February 16 – Sir Thomas Gerard, 1st Baronet, English Member of Parliament (b. 1560)
- February 28 – Cosimo II de' Medici, Grand Duke of Tuscany (b. 1590)
- March 4 – Ana de Jesús, Spanish Discalced Carmelite nun, spiritual writer and Servant of God (b. 1545)
- March 8 – Enevold Kruse, Danish noble (b. 1554)
- March 27 – Benedetto Giustiniani, Italian Catholic cardinal (b. 1554)
- March 28 – Ottavio Rinuccini, Italian composer (b. 1562)
- March 31 – King Philip III of Spain, (Philip II of Portugal) (b. 1578)

=== April–June ===
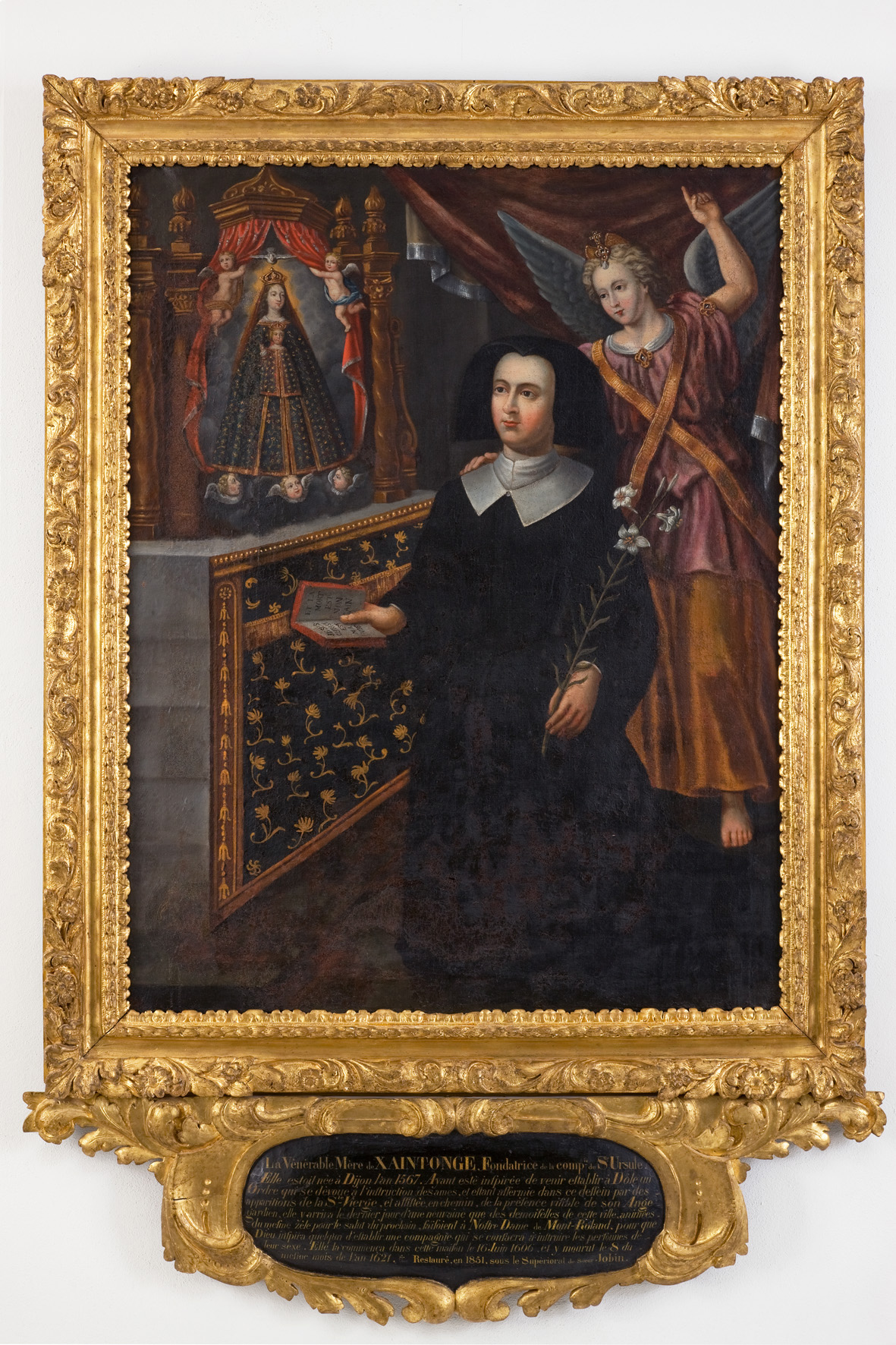
Venerable Anne de Xainctonge

- April 1 – Cristofano Allori, Italian painter (b. 1577)
- April 6
  - Archduchess Maria Christina of Austria (b. 1574)
  - Edward Seymour, 1st Earl of Hertford (b. 1539)
- April 18 – Bridget Chaworth, English noble (b. 1542)
- April 21 – Anne of Ostfriesland, German noblewoman (b. 1562)
- April – John Carver, first governor of Plymouth Colony
- May 3 – Elizabeth Bacon, English Tudor gentlewoman (b. 1541)
- May 11 – Johann Arndt, German theologian (b. 1555)
- May 15 – Hendrick de Keyser, Dutch architect and sculptor (b. 1565)
- June 2
  - Dorothea of Lorraine (b. 1545)
  - Eilhard Lubinus, German theologian (b. 1565)
- June 8 – Anne de Xainctonge, French Roman Catholic nun (b. 1567)
- June 21
  - Kryštof Harant z Polžic a Bezdružic, Bohemian composer, soldier and author (executed) (b. 1564)
  - Maxmilián Hošťálek, Czech noble and politician (executed) (b. 1564)
  - Joachim Andreas von Schlick, Czech leader (executed) (b. 1569)
  - Jan Jesenius, Slovak physician (executed) (b. 1566)
- June 23 – Zsigmond Forgách, Hungarian noble and soldier (b. 1559)
- June 26 – Christence Kruckow, Danish noble (b. 1558)

=== July–September ===
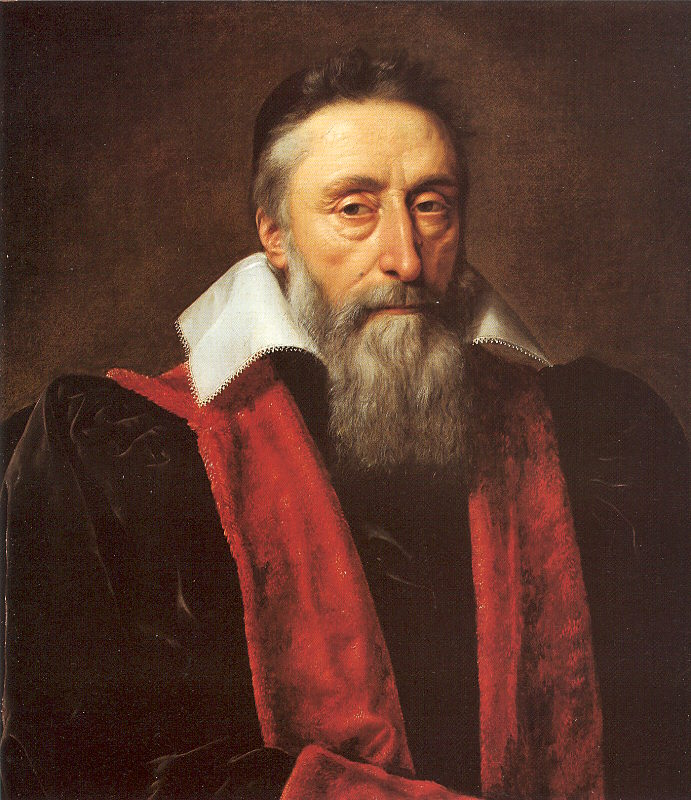
Guillaume du Vair

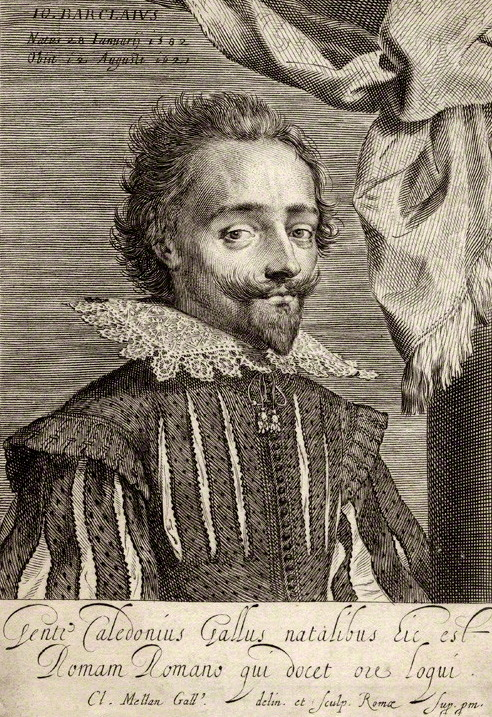
John Barclay

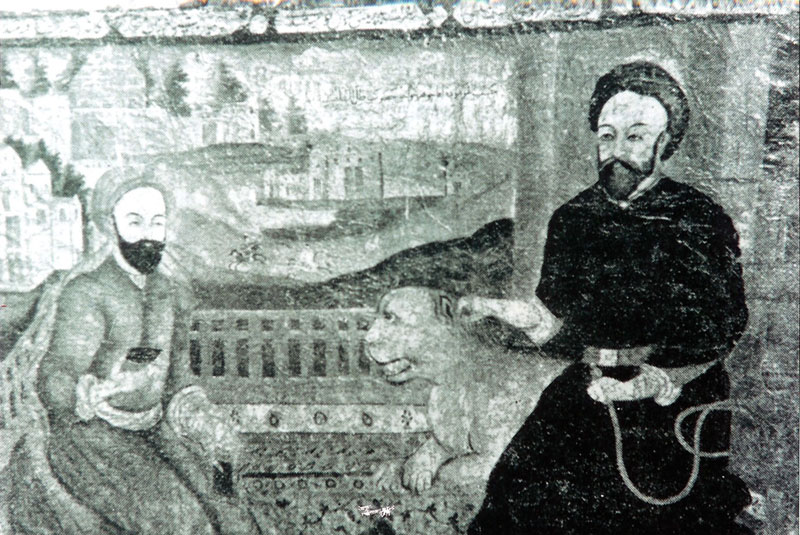
Bahāʾ al-dīn al-ʿĀmilī

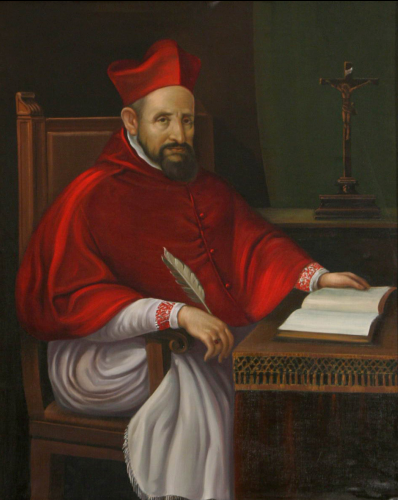
Saint Robert Bellarmine

- July 2 – Thomas Harriot, English astronomer and mathematician (b. c. 1560)
- July 4 – Jean de Bonsi, Catholic cardinal (b. 1554)
- July 10 – Charles Bonaventure de Longueval, Count of Bucquoy, soldier in Habsburg service (b. 1571)
- July 13 – Albert VII of Austria, Habsburg royal (b. 1559)
- July 19 – Don Giovanni de' Medici, Italian military commander and diplomat (b. 1567)
- July 30 – Rudolph, Prince of Anhalt-Zerbst (b. 1576)
- August 3
  - Guillaume du Vair, French author and lawyer (b. 1556)
  - Anna Juliana Gonzaga, Archduchess of Austria and nun (b. 1566)
- August 7 – Count Jobst of Limburg (b. 1560)
- August 13 – John Berchmans, Belgian Jesuit scholastic and saint (b. 1599)
- August 15 – John Barclay, Scottish writer (b. 1582)
- August 23 – Antonio il Verso, Italian composer (b. 1565)
- August 30 – Bahāʾ al-dīn al-ʿĀmilī, one of the main co-founders of Isfahan School of Islamic Philosophy (b. 1547)
- September 7 – Peter Warburton, English Justice of the Common Plea (b. 1540)
- September 17 – Robert Bellarmine, Italian Roman Catholic bishop, saint, proponent of futurism (b. 1542)
- September 20 – Henry of Lorraine, Duke of Mayenne, French noble (b. 1578)
- September 24 – Jan Karol Chodkiewicz, Polish military commander (b. 1560)
- September 25 – Mary Sidney, English writer, patroness and translator (b. 1561)

=== October–December ===
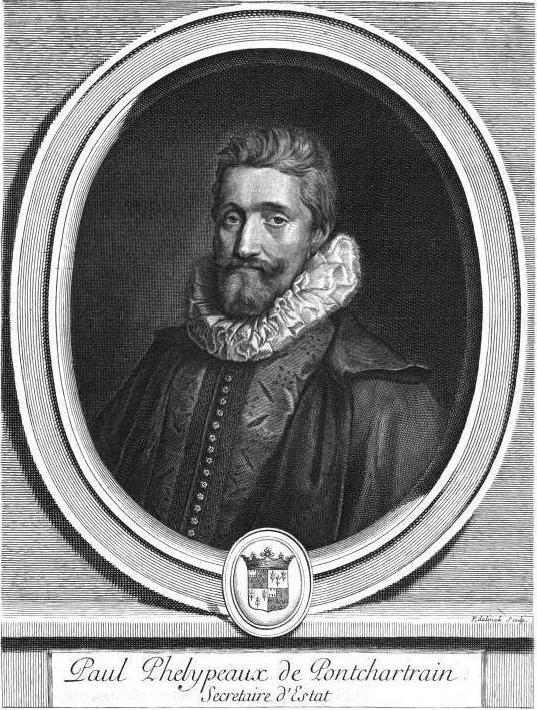
Paul Phélypeaux de Pontchartrain

- October 8 – Antoine de Montchrestien, French dramatist and economist (b. c. 1575)
- October 11 – Andrzej Sapieha, Polish nobleman (b. 1539)
- October 16 – Jan Pieterszoon Sweelinck, Dutch composer (b. 1562)
- October 19 – Imre Thurzó, Hungarian noble (b. 1598)
- October 21 – Paul Phélypeaux de Pontchartrain, French politician (b. 1569)
- November 26 – Ralph Agas, English surveyor (b. c. 1540)
- December 4 – Andrew Willet, English theologian (b. 1562)
- December 13 – Katarina Stenbock, queen of Gustav I of Sweden (b. 1535)
- December 15 – Charles d'Albert, duc de Luynes, Constable of France (b. 1578)
