= 1604 =

1604 in various calendars
- Gregorian calendar: 1604; MDCIV
- Ab urbe condita: 2357
- Armenian calendar: 1053; ԹՎ ՌԾԳ
- Assyrian calendar: 6354
- Balinese saka calendar: 1525–1526
- Bengali calendar: 1010–1011
- Berber calendar: 2554
- English Regnal year: 1 Ja. 1 – 2 Ja. 1
- Buddhist calendar: 2148
- Burmese calendar: 966
- Byzantine calendar: 7112–7113
- Chinese calendar: 癸卯年 (Water Rabbit); 4301 or 4094 — to — 甲辰年 (Wood Dragon); 4302 or 4095
- Coptic calendar: 1320–1321
- Discordian calendar: 2770
- Ethiopian calendar: 1596–1597
- Hebrew calendar: 5364–5365
- Hindu calendars
- Vikram Samvat: 1660–1661
- Shaka Samvat: 1525–1526
- Kali Yuga: 4704–4705
- Holocene calendar: 11604
- Igbo calendar: 604–605
- Iranian calendar: 982–983
- Islamic calendar: 1012–1013
- Japanese calendar: Keichō 9 (慶長９年)
- Javanese calendar: 1524–1525
- Julian calendar: Gregorian minus 10 days
- Korean calendar: 3937
- Minguo calendar: 308 before ROC 民前308年
- Nanakshahi calendar: 136
- Thai solar calendar: 2146–2147
- Tibetan calendar: ཆུ་མོ་ཡོས་ལོ་ (female Water-Hare); 1730 or 1349 or 577 — to — ཤིང་ཕོ་འབྲུག་ལོ་ (male Wood-Dragon); 1731 or 1350 or 578

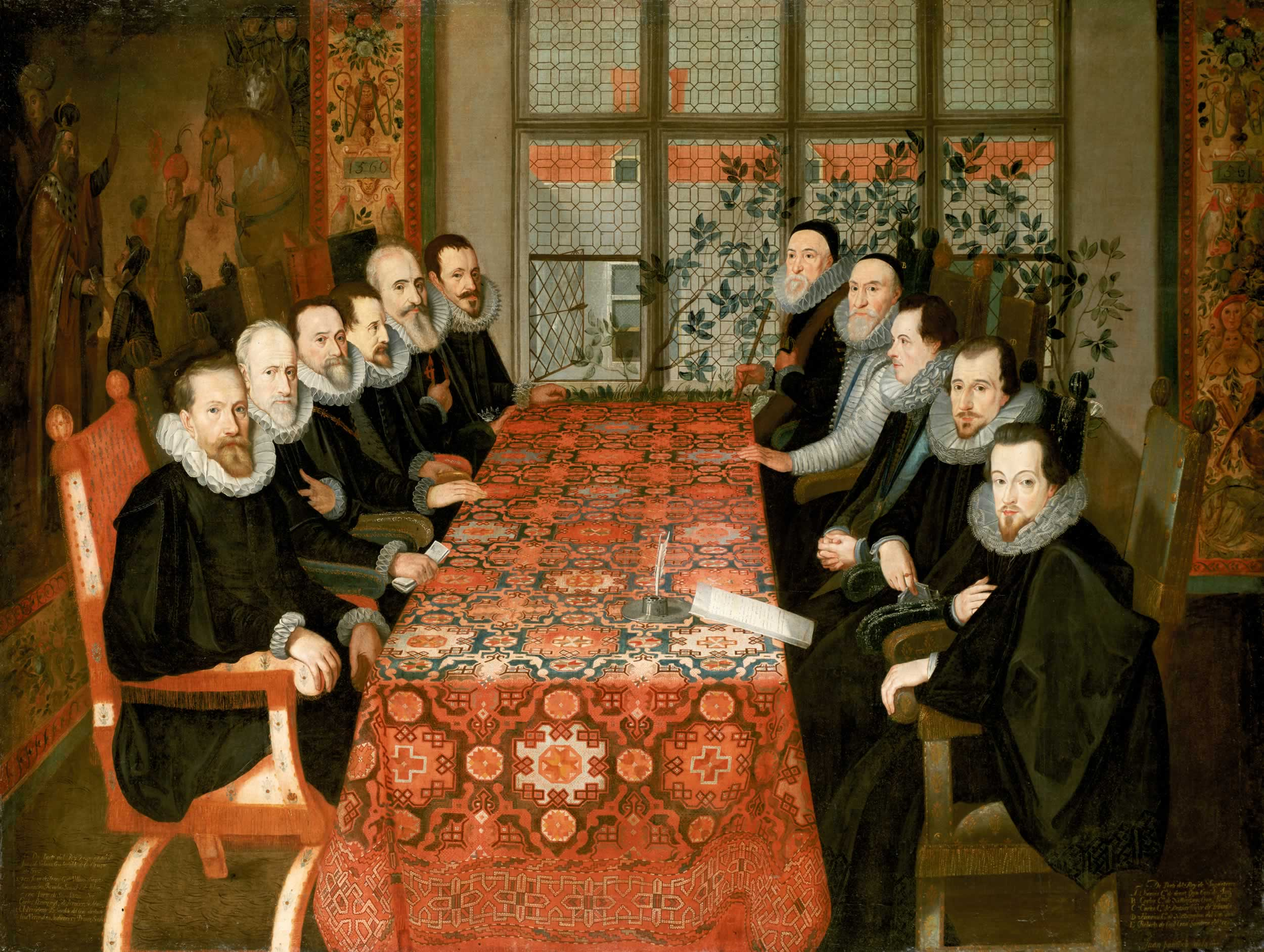
August 28: The Treaty of London concludes the Anglo-Spanish War

1604 (MDCIV) was a leap year starting on Thursday of the Gregorian calendar and a leap year starting on Sunday of the Julian calendar, the 1604th year of the Common Era (CE) and Anno Domini (AD) designations, the 604th year of the 2nd millennium, the 4th year of the 17th century, and the 5th year of the 1600s decade. As of the start of 1604, the Gregorian calendar was 10 days ahead of the Julian calendar, which remained in localized use until 1923.

== Events ==
=== January–March ===
- January 1 – The earliest recorded performance of William Shakespeare's play A Midsummer Night's Dream takes place at Hampton Court prior to the main presentation, The Masque of Indian and China Knights, which is performed by courtiers of King James.
- January 14 – The Hampton Court Conference is held between James I of England, the Anglican bishops and representatives of the Puritans. Work begins on the Authorized King James Version of the Bible and revision of the Book of Common Prayer.
- February 14 – King James of England denounces the Roman Catholic Church after learning from one of his spies, Sir Anthony Standen, that Queen Anne has been sent a rosary from the Pope.
- February 17 – King James issues an order for all Jesuits and all Roman Catholic priests to leave his kingdom by March 19.
- February 24 – At Linköping in Sweden, the Riksdag declares that Sigismund, Grand Duke of Lithuania and King of Poland, who has been absent for five years, has effectively abdicated as King of Sweden, and recognizes Karl, Duke of Södermanland, as the new monarch.
- March 15 – More than seven months after their July 25, 1603 coronation, King James I and Anne, Queen consort make the traditional Royal Entry to London. The ceremonies have been postponed from 1603 because of the ongoing plague.
- March 19 – King James opens his first parliamentary session as King of England. In his opening speech to the "Blessed Parliament", the King makes clear that he wants to bring a legal union between England and Scotland and that he does not wish to be "a husband to two wives." The House of Commons refuses to agree with him on the unification of the crown or on the funding that the King requests.
- March 22 – Karl IX begins his reign as King of Sweden.

=== April–June ===
- April 9 – On the first day of the new year 966 M.E. on the Burmese calendar, King Nyaungyan Min of Burma makes a triumphant return to his capital at Inwa after his victory in the war against the principality of Mongnai (Monē), one of the Shan States between Burma and Siam
- April 17 – Tsar Dmitry of Russia makes a public conversion to Roman Catholicism in order to attract the aid of Jesuits in his attempt to rule all of Russia.
- April 18 – Maurice of Nassau assembles a combined army of 7,000 Dutch and 4,000 English soldiers to make an attack on the Spanish Netherlands (now Belgium).
- May 19 – Maurice of Nassau begins the Siege of Sluis, a port in the Spanish Netherlands, with 11,000 Dutch and English troops. Despite reinforcements from Spanish relief troops, the city surrenders after three months, with both sides having lost hundreds of casualties.
- May 20
  - Five conspirators in England, led by Robert Catesby, who has invited Thomas Wintour, John Wright, Thomas Percy and Guy Fawkes, meet at the Duck and Drake Inn in London to make a plan for the assassination of King James.
  - Peace discussions between England and Spain begin at Somerset House in London to end the Anglo-Spanish War after 19 years of fighting.
- May 22 – English entrepreneur Charles Leigh and a crew of 46 arrive in South America at what is now the Oyapock River in French Guiana after traveling on the ship Olive Plant. The 35 men and boys who stay create a colonial settlement which they call Oliveleigh, and make a claim to all of the area.
- June 9 – Thomas Percy, one of the English conspirators in the Gunpowder Plot to assassinate King James I, is appointed as one of the king's bodyguards by the Earl of Northumberland.
- June 15 – Ottoman–Safavid War: General Cigalazade Yusuf Sinan Pasha, commander of the eastern Ottoman Army, leads troops on a march from Constantinople to fight the Persia's Safavid Army in Armenia, but arrives too late to save the city of Yerevan.
- June – Ottoman–Safavid War (1603–18): Shāh Abbas I of Persia's Safavid army captures the city of Yerevan from the Ottoman Empire after a siege. At this time the Shāh begins the expulsion of Armenians from Jolfa to New Julfa in his capital of Isfahan; more than 25,000 die during the exodus.

=== July–September ===
- July 4 – The Jesuits Act 1603 (officially "An Act for the due execution of the Statutes against Jesuits, seminary Priests and recusants") is given royal assent by King James I of England to create penalties against Jesuits and Catholics who send their children abroad to Catholic colleges.
- July 7
  - On 11 Safar 1013 AH in the Islamic calendar, the decree of Ottoman Sultan Ahmed I is read aloud in the Great Mosque of Mecca, declaring that Idris ibn Hasan has been proclaimed the new Sharif of Mecca, in partnership with Idris's brother Fuhayd ibn Hasan and Idris and Fuhayd's nephew, Muhsin ibn Husayn
  - King James angrily dismisses the English parliament after failing to get full financial subsidies. He tells the members in his closing speech, "I am not of such a stock as to praise fools."
- July 16 – The last of the 18 sessions of the English and Spanish peace conference is held at the Old Somerset House in London, with the parties reaching an agreement on terms of a treaty.
- July 22 – King James begins fundraising for his project for an accurate translation of the Holy Bible into English, asking Richard Bancroft, Archbishop of Canterbury, to contact all Anglican churches for donations.
- August 5 – Sokolluzade Mehmed Pasha becomes the new Ottoman Grand Vizier, replacing the late Yavuz Ali Pasha
- August 18 – England concludes the Treaty of London with Spain, ending the Anglo-Spanish War (1585–1604), an intermittent conflict within the Eighty Years' War.
- August 19 – The Dutch siege of Sluis in the Spanish Netherlands ends after three months, a day after relief troops commanded by General Ambrogio Spinola retreat. At least 2,000 of the members of the Spanish garrison inside had been killed or incapacitated by disease and famine. Sluis becomes part of the Netherlands afterward.
- September 1 – Sri Guru Granth Sahib, the religious text of Sikhism, whose compilation by Guru Arjan was completed on August 29, is installed at Harmandir Sahib in Amritsar.
- September 20 – After a bloody three-year siege. Ostend is finally captured by Spanish forces under Ambrogio Spinola

=== October–December ===
- October 4 – Za Dengel, Emperor of Ethiopia, is killed in battle with the forces of Za Sellase, who restores his cousin Yaqob to the throne.
- October 9 – Kepler's Supernova (SN 1604) is first observed from the northern parts of the Italian Peninsula. Beginning on October 17, Johannes Kepler begins a year's observation of it from Prague. There won't be another supernova visible to the "naked-eye" until 1987. As of 2023, this is the last supernova to be observed in the Milky Way.
- November 1 – The first recorded performance of William Shakespeare's tragedy, Othello, takes place at the Palace of Whitehall in London.
- December 26 – On the evening of Saint Stephen's Day), the first recorded performance of Shakespeare's "problem play" Measure for Measure takes place, before King James I of England in the banquet hall of the Palace of Whitehall.
- December 29 – The 1604 Quanzhou earthquake, with an estimated 8.1 magnitude, shakes the Taiwan Strait leaving several dead.

=== Date unknown ===
- France begins settling Acadia, first successful French North American colony.
- Before 1 October, Huntingdon Beaumont completes the Wollaton Wagonway, built to transport coal from the mines at Strelley to Wollaton just west of Nottingham, England, the world's oldest wagonway with provenance.
- The Table Alphabeticall, the first known English dictionary to be organized by alphabetical ordering, is published.
- First publication of Christopher Marlowe's play The Tragical History of Doctor Faustus, in London.
- Lancelot de Casteau's L'Ouverture de cuisine published in Liège, including the first printed recipe for choux pastry.

=== Religion ===
- According to legend, the vault of Christian Rosenkreuz is discovered.
- The Papacy is expected to fall this year by Tobias Hess and Simon Studion according to their correspondence in 1597.

== Births ==
Johann Rudolf Glauber

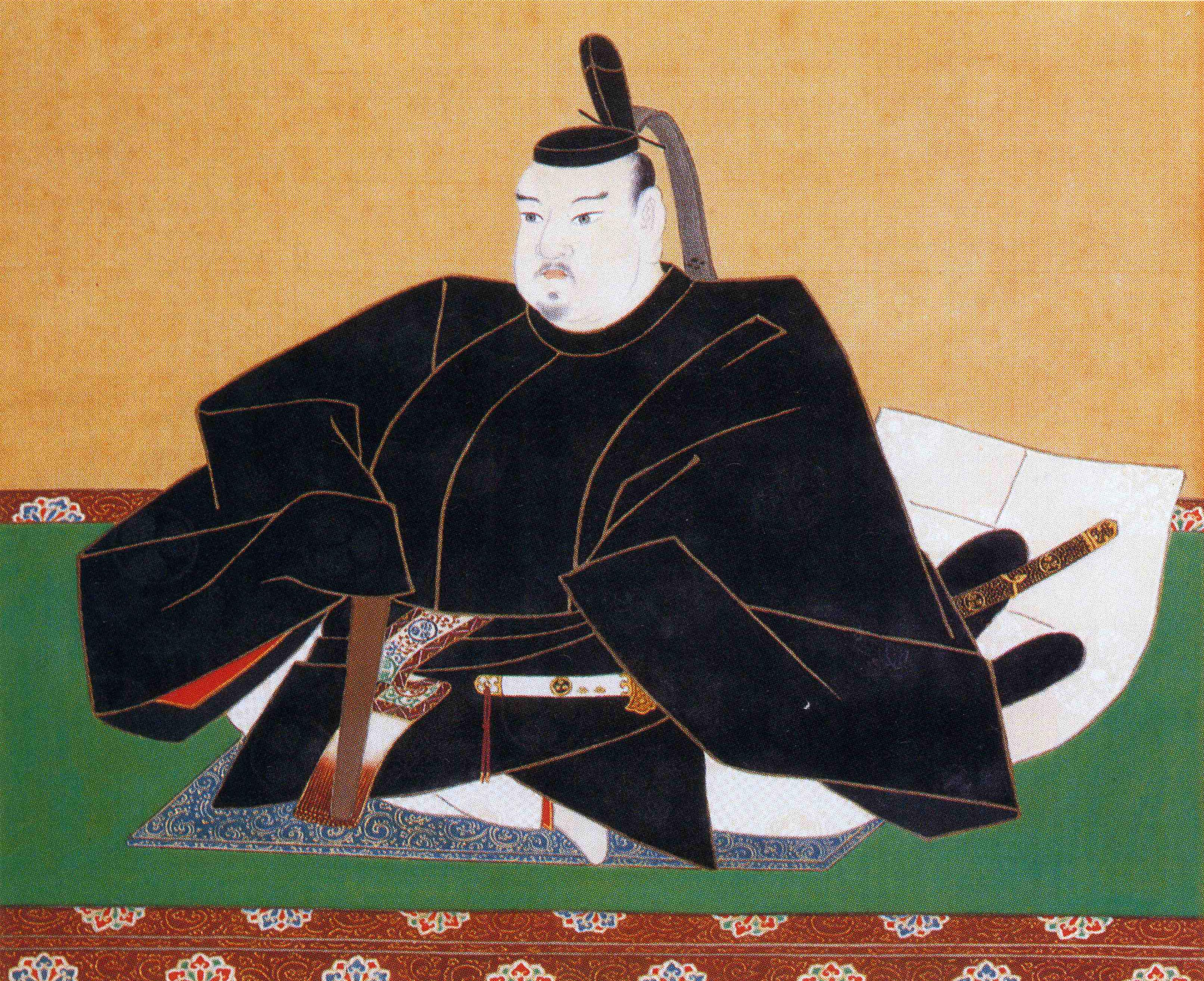
Tokugawa Iemitsu

=== January–March ===
- January 4 – Jakob Balde, German Latinist (d. 1668)
- February 2 – Juan de Leyva de la Cerda, conde de Baños, Spanish noble (d. 1678)
- February 24 – Arcangela Tarabotti, born Elena Tarabotti, Venetian nun and feminist (d. 1652)
- March 10 – Johann Rudolf Glauber, German-Dutch alchemist and chemist (approximate date; d. 1670)
- March 19 – King John IV of Portugal (d. 1656)
- March 23 – Girolamo Colonna, Catholic cardinal (d. 1666)

=== April–June ===
- April 5 – Charles IV, Duke of Lorraine (d. 1675)
- April 9 – Duke Francis Henry of Saxe-Lauenburg (d. 1658)
- April 17
  - Giovanni Giacomo Barbelli, Italian painter (d. 1656)
  - Frans Luycx, Flemish Baroque painter (d. 1668)
- April 22 – Peter Venables, Welsh politician (d. 1669)
- April 28 – Joris Jansen Rapelje, Early Dutch settler in colonial North America (d. 1662)
- May 1 – Louis, Count of Soissons (d. 1641)
- May 4 – Sir Hugh Owen, 1st Baronet, English politician (d. 1670)
- May 10 – Jean Mairet, classical French dramatist who wrote both tragedies and comedies (d. 1686)
- May 17 – Vincent Baron, French Dominican theologian writer (d. 1674)
- May 28 – Catherine of Brandenburg, Princess of Transylvania (1629–1630) (d. 1649)
- June 4 – Claudia de' Medici (d. 1648)
- June 10 – John Manners, 8th Earl of Rutland, English politician when he inherited the peerage (d. 1679)
- June 17 – John Maurice, Prince of Nassau-Siegen (d. 1679)
- June 28 – Heinrich Albert, German composer and poet (d. 1651)
- June 30 – Margaret Elisabeth of Leiningen-Westerburg, Regent of Hesse-Homburg (d. 1667)

=== July–September ===
- July 8 – Christiaen van Couwenbergh, Dutch painter (d. 1667)
- July 25 – Dorothea Diana of Salm, German noblewoman (d. 1672)
- August 4 – François Hédelin, abbé d'Aubignac, French author (d. 1676)
- August 12 – Tokugawa Iemitsu, Japanese shōgun (d. 1651)
- August 16 – Bernhard of Saxe-Weimar, general in the Thirty Years' War (d. 1639)
- August 25 – Shang Kexi, Chinese general (d. 1676)
- September 13 – Sir William Brereton, 1st Baronet, English soldier and politician (d. 1661)
- September 21 – Angelo Michele Colonna, Italian painter (d. 1687)

=== October–December ===
- October 14 – Nils Brahe, Swedish soldier and younger brother of Per Brahe (d. 1632)
- October 22 – Simon Le Moyne, French missionary (d. 1665)
- October 31
  - Luigi Baccio del Bianco, Italian painter (d. 1657)
  - Krisztina Nyáry, Hungarian noblewoman (d. 1641)
- November 3 – Osman II, Sultan of the Ottoman Empire (d. 1622)
- November 6 – George Ent, English scientist (d. 1689)
- November 7
  - Bernard of Offida, Italian saint (d. 1694)
  - Jacques Leneuf de La Poterie, Politician (d. 1687)
- November 26 – Johannes Bach, German composer and musician (d. 1673)
- December 7 – Ambrose Corbie, English Jesuit teacher (d. 1649)
- December 10 – David Barry, 1st Earl of Barrymore, Irish noble (d. 1642)

=== Date unknown ===
- Jasper Mayne, English dramatist (d. 1672)
- Isaac Ambrose, English Puritan divine (d. 1664)
- Menasseh Ben Israel, Jewish Rabbi (d. 1657)
- Giovanni Battista Michelini, Italian painter (d. 1655)
- Edward Pococke, English Orientalist and biblical scholar (d. 1691)

=== Probable ===
- Abraham Bosse, French engraver and artist (d. 1676)
- Egbert Bartholomeusz Kortenaer, Dutch admiral (d. 1665)

== Deaths ==
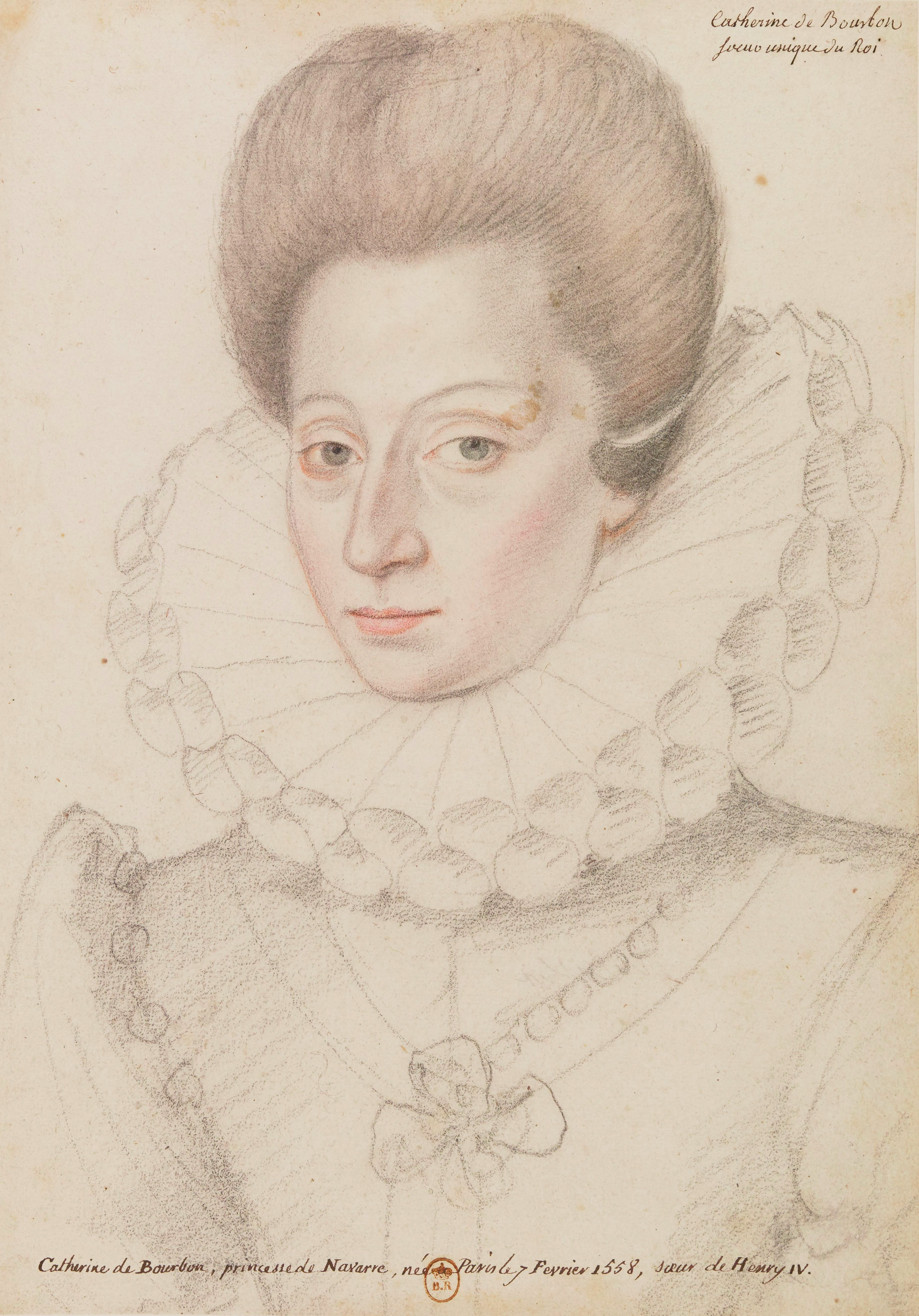
Catherine de Bourbon

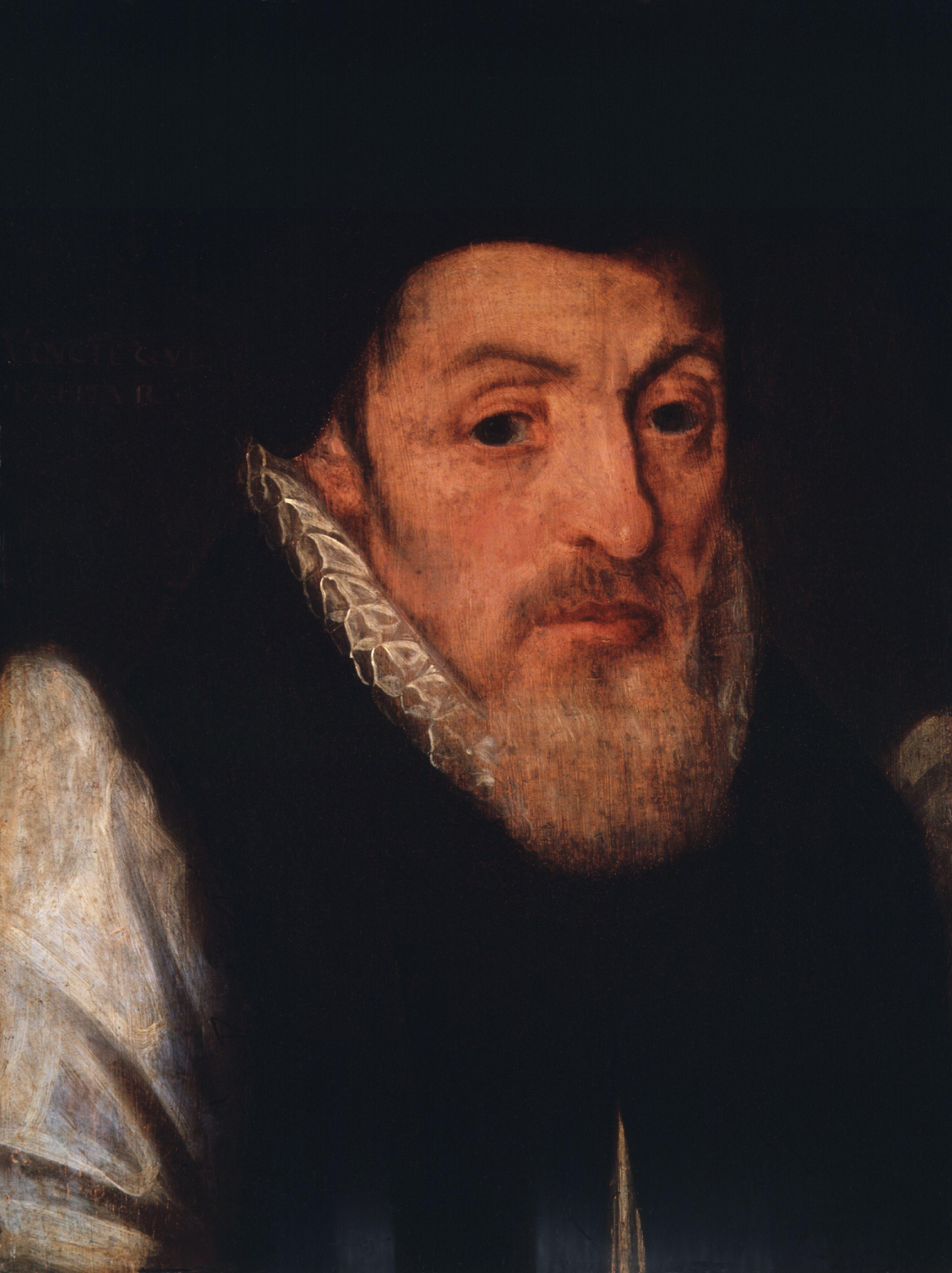
John Whitgift

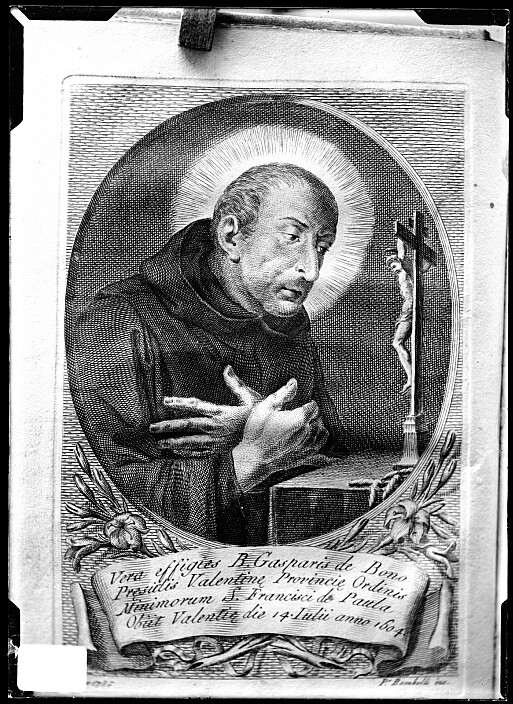
Gaspar de Bono

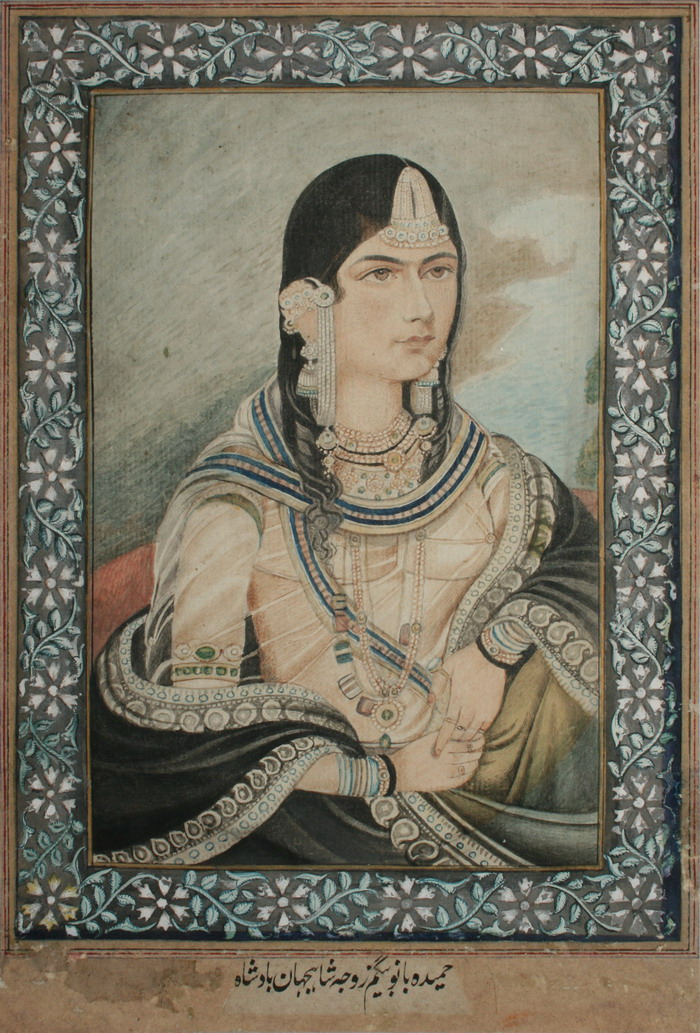
Hamida Banu Begum

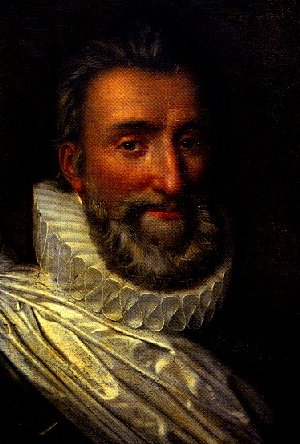
Ercole, Lord of Monaco

=== January–March ===
- January 4 – Ferenc Nádasdy, Hungarian noble (b. 1555)
- January 10 – Juliana of Lazarevo, Russian saint (b. 1530)
- January 17 – Santino Garsi da Parma, Italian musician (b. 1542)
- January 18 – Dorothy Catherine of Brandenburg-Ansbach, Burggräfin of Meissen (b. 1538)
- January 23 – Hyujeong, Korean Seon master (b. 1520)
- February 9 – Anne Russell, Countess of Warwick, wife of Ambrose Dudley, 3rd Earl of Warwick (b. 1548)
- February 10 – Cyriacus Spangenberg, German theologian and historian (b. 1528)
- February 13 – Catherine de Bourbon, French princess (b. 1559)
- February 24 – Christoph Pezel, German theologian (b. 1539)
- February 29 – John Whitgift, Archbishop of Canterbury from 1583 to his death (b. c. 1530)
- March 4 – Fausto Paolo Sozzini, Italian theologian (b. 1539)
- March 13 – Arnaud d'Ossat, French diplomat and writer (b. 1537)

=== April–June ===
- April 8 – Daniyal, Imperial Prince of the Timurid Dynasty, Viceroy of Deccan (b. 1572)
- April 14 – Ernest Frederick, Margrave of Baden-Durlach (1584–1604) (b. 1560)
- April 19 – Kuroda Yoshitaka, Japanese daimyō (b. 1546)
- April 21 – Koide Hidemasa, Samurai (b. 1539)
- April 25 – Pietro de' Medici, Italian noble (b. 1554)
- May 4 – Claudio Merulo, Italian composer (b. 1533)
- May 13 – Christine of Hesse (b. 1543)
- May 22 – Peter Ernst I von Mansfeld-Vorderort, Governor of the Habsburg Netherlands (b. 1517)
- May 26 – Godfrey Goldsborough, English bishop (b. 1548)
- June 5 – Thomas Muffet, English naturalist and physician (b. 1553)
- June 10 – Isabella Andreini, Italian actress (b. 1562)
- June 21 – Jonathan Trelawny, English politician (b. 1568)
- June 24 – Edward de Vere, 17th Earl of Oxford, Lord Great Chamberlain of England, poet and possibly playwright (b. 1550)

=== July–September ===
- July 14 – Gaspar de Bono, Beatified Spanish Army veteran and Minim friar (b. 1530)
- August 3 – Bernardino de Mendoza, Spanish military commander
- August 8 – Horio Tadauji, Japanese warlord (b. 1578)
- August 12 – John I, Count Palatine of Zweibrücken (b. 1550)
- August 20 – Toda Kazuaki, Japanese samurai (b. 1542)
- August 29
  - Hamida Banu Begum, wife of the Mughal emperor Humayun (b. 1527)
  - Otto Henry, Count Palatine of Sulzbach, Counts Palatine of Sulzbach (b. 1556)
- August 30 – John Juvenal Ancina, Italian Oratorian and bishop (b. 1545)
- September 10 – William Morgan, Welsh Bible translator (b. 1545)
- September 12 – Louis Gunther of Nassau, Count of Nassau-Katzenelnbogen (b. 1575)
- September 17 – Lucas Osiander the Elder, German pastor (b. 1534)
- September 22 – Dorothy Stafford, English noble (b. 1526)
- September 23 – Gabriel Vásquez, Spanish theologian (b. 1549)

=== October–December ===
- October 8 – Janus Dousa, Dutch historian and noble (b. 1545)
- October 9
  - Louis IV, Landgrave of Hesse-Marburg, German noble (b. 1537)
  - William Peryam, British judge (b. 1534)
- October 18 – Igram van Achelen, Dutch statesman (b. 1528)
- October 22 – Domingo Báñez, Spanish theologian (b. 1528)
- October 24 – Za Dengel, Emperor of Ethiopia
- October 25 – Claude de La Trémoille, French noble (b. 1566)
- November – Thomas Storer, English poet (b. 1571)
- November 21 – John Thynne, English landowner and politician (b. 1555)
- November 23
  - Olbracht Łaski, Polish alchemist (b. 1527)
  - Francesco Barozzi, Italian mathematician (b. 1537)
- November 29 – Ercole, Lord of Monaco, Monegasque noble (b. 1562)
- December 30 – George Hastings, 4th Earl of Huntingdon, English nobleman (b. 1540)

=== Date unknown ===
- Thomas Churchyard, English author, secretary to Edward de Vere (b. 1520)
- Thomas North, English translator of Plutarch (b. 1535)
- Richard Topcliffe, English politician and torturer (b. 1531)
- Ma Shouzhen, Chinese Gējì, painter, poet, and playwright (b. 1548)
