= 1676 =

1676 in various calendars
- Gregorian calendar: 1676; MDCLXXVI
- Ab urbe condita: 2429
- Armenian calendar: 1125; ԹՎ ՌՃԻԵ
- Assyrian calendar: 6426
- Balinese saka calendar: 1597–1598
- Bengali calendar: 1082–1083
- Berber calendar: 2626
- English Regnal year: 27 Cha. 2 – 28 Cha. 2
- Buddhist calendar: 2220
- Burmese calendar: 1038
- Byzantine calendar: 7184–7185
- Chinese calendar: 乙卯年 (Wood Rabbit); 4373 or 4166 — to — 丙辰年 (Fire Dragon); 4374 or 4167
- Coptic calendar: 1392–1393
- Discordian calendar: 2842
- Ethiopian calendar: 1668–1669
- Hebrew calendar: 5436–5437
- Hindu calendars
- Vikram Samvat: 1732–1733
- Shaka Samvat: 1597–1598
- Kali Yuga: 4776–4777
- Holocene calendar: 11676
- Igbo calendar: 676–677
- Iranian calendar: 1054–1055
- Islamic calendar: 1086–1087
- Japanese calendar: Enpō 4 (延宝４年)
- Javanese calendar: 1598–1599
- Julian calendar: Gregorian minus 10 days
- Korean calendar: 4009
- Minguo calendar: 236 before ROC 民前236年
- Nanakshahi calendar: 208
- Thai solar calendar: 2218–2219
- Tibetan calendar: ཤིང་མོ་ཡོས་ལོ་ (female Wood-Hare); 1802 or 1421 or 649 — to — མེ་ཕོ་འབྲུག་ལོ་ (male Fire-Dragon); 1803 or 1422 or 650

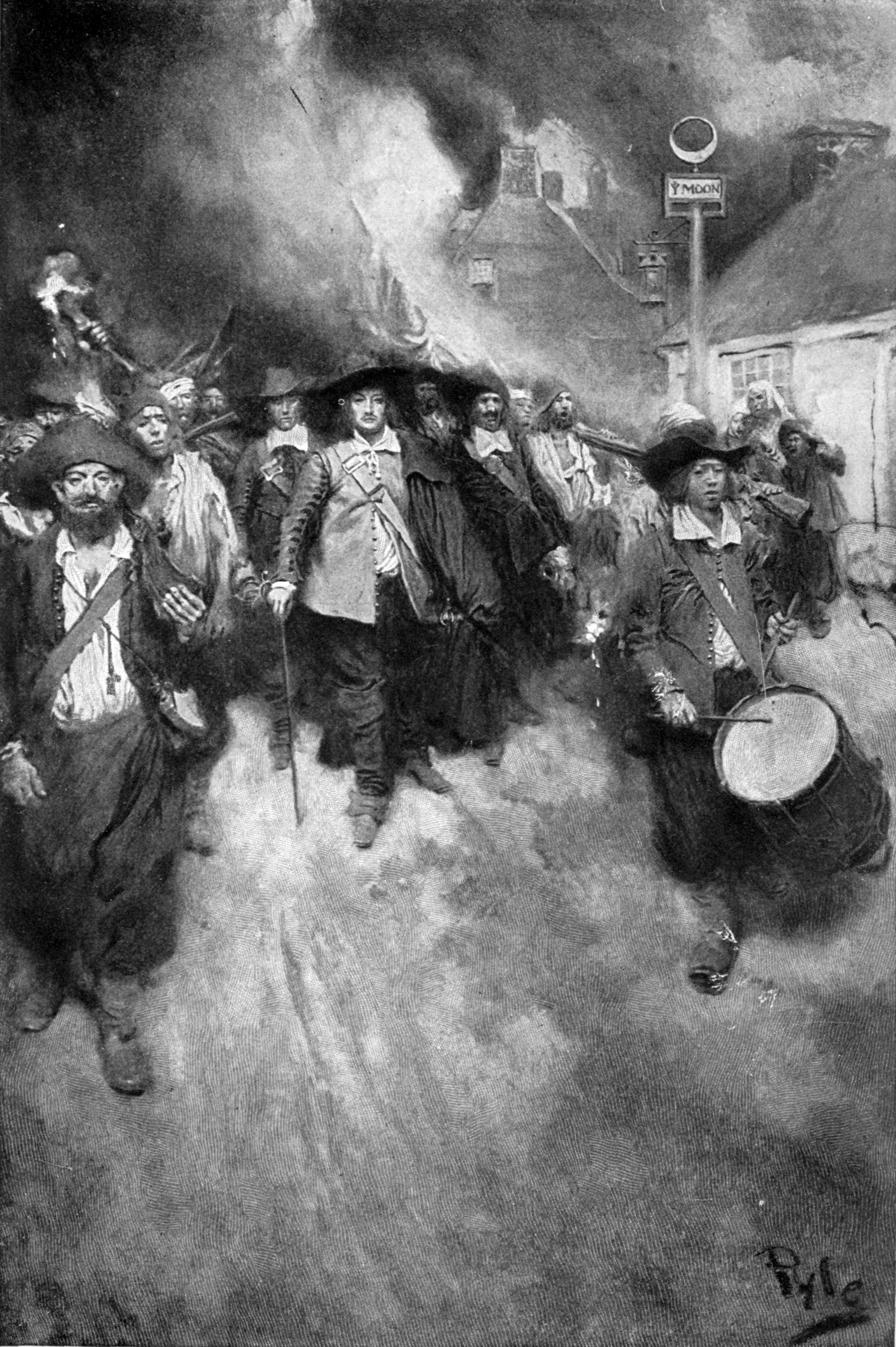
September 19: Virginian rebels commanded by Nathaniel Bacon burn down Jamestown, Virginia during war against British governor.

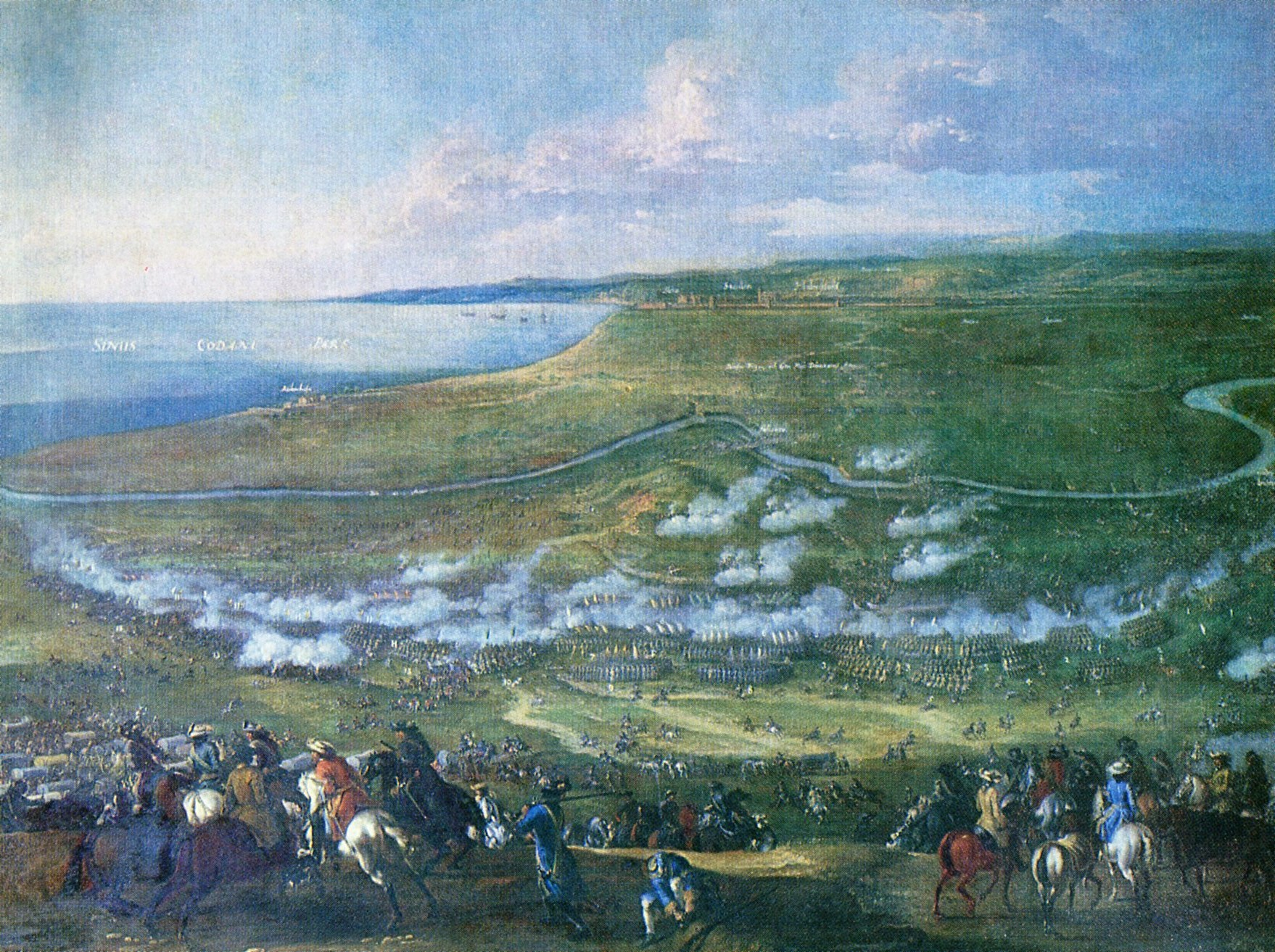
August 17: Sweden defeats Denmark-Norway in Battle of Halmstad.

1676 (MDCLXXVI) was a leap year starting on Wednesday of the Gregorian calendar and a leap year starting on Saturday of the Julian calendar, the 1676th year of the Common Era (CE) and Anno Domini (AD) designations, the 676th year of the 2nd millennium, the 76th year of the 17th century, and the 7th year of the 1670s decade. As of the start of 1676, the Gregorian calendar was 10 days ahead of the Julian calendar, which remained in localized use until 1923.

== Events ==
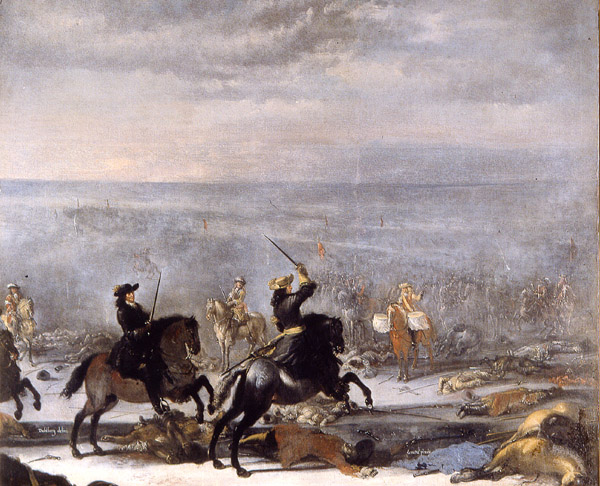
December 4: Battle of Lund

=== January–March ===
- January 29 – Feodor III becomes Tsar of Russia.
- January 31 – Universidad de San Carlos de Guatemala, the oldest institution of higher education in Central America, is founded.
- January – Six months into King Philip's War, Metacomet (King Philip), leader of the Algonquian tribe known as the Wampanoag, travels westward to the Mohawk nation, seeking an alliance with the Mohawks against the English colonists of New England; his efforts in creating such an alliance are a failure.
- February 10 – After the Nipmuc tribe attacks Lancaster, Massachusetts, colonist Mary Rowlandson is taken captive, and lives with the Indians until May.
- February 14 – Metacomet and his Wampanoags attack Northampton, Massachusetts; meanwhile, the Massachusetts Council debates whether a wall should be erected around Boston.
- February 23 – While the Massachusetts Council debates how to handle the Christian Indians they had exiled to Deer Island on October 13, 1675, a coalition of Indians led by Metacomet attacks colonial settlements just 16 km (9.9 mi) outside of Boston.
- March 29 – Providence, Rhode Island is attacked and destroyed by Native Americans.

=== April–June ===
- April 2 – Chief Canonchet of the Narragansett people is captured by mercenaries of the Pequot, Mohegan and Niantic nations who have been hired by English settlers. He is offered a chance to live if he makes peace with the English, refuses, and is executed the next day in Stonington, Connecticut.
- April 12 – Richard Raynsford becomes the new Lord Chief Justice of England and Wales.
- April 21 – Sudbury Fight: The village of Sudbury, Massachusetts is attacked by Metacom's Wampanoag Confederation as one of the last major battles of King Phillip's War. Captain Samuel Wadworth and 28 of his men are killed in the defense of the town.
- April 22 – The Battle of Augusta is fought in the Mediterranean Sea off of the coast of Sicily during the Franco-Dutch War. The French Navy and the combined Dutch Republic and Spanish forces each lose over 500 men.
- May 2 – Mary Rowlandson is ransomed from captivity by Native Americans by a subscription raised by women of Boston.
- May 19 – Peskeomskut Massacre: Battle of Turner's Falls – Captain William Turner leads a raid at first light on an encampment consisting mainly of women and children. An estimated 300-400 lives are taken in less than half an hour, first from gunshot directly into the sleeping tents, then by sword and by drowning as the victims try to flee. This incident happens on the west bank of the Connecticut River, just above the falls known as Turner's Falls in Gill, Massachusetts.
- May 26 – A fire destroys the town hall and 624 houses in Southwark, London.
- May 31 – The Massachusetts Council finally decides to move the Christian Indians from Deer Island to Cambridge, Massachusetts (approximate date).
- June 1 – Scanian War: Battle of Öland – A combined fleet of the Dutch Republic and Denmark–Norway decisively defeats the Swedish Navy, which loses its flagship Stora Kronan. The man-of-war, Kronan, one of the largest seagoing vessels in the world, goes down with at at least 600 members of its 650-man crew and will remain at the bottom of the Baltic Sea for more than 300 years before being rediscovered in 1980.
- June 12 – The Indian coalition attacks Hadley, Massachusetts, but are repelled by Connecticut troops.
- June 19 – Massachusetts issues a declaration of amnesty to any Indian who surrenders.
- June – Bacon's Rebellion begins in the Virginia Colony. On July 30, Nathaniel Bacon and his followers issue the Declaration of the People of Virginia.

=== July–September ===
- July 2 – Major John Talcott and his troops begin sweeping Connecticut and Rhode Island, capturing large numbers of Native Americans from Algonquian tribes and exporting them out of the English colonies as slaves.
- July 4 – Captain Benjamin Church and his soldiers begin sweeping Plymouth Colony, for any remaining Wampanoag tribesmen.
- July 11 – The Wampanoags attack Taunton, Massachusetts, but are repelled by colonists.
- July 17 – In France, Madame de Brinvilliers is executed for poisoning her father and brothers. The case also scares King Louis XIV into starting a series of investigations about possible poisonings and witchcraft (later called the Affair of the Poisons).
- July 27 – Nearly 200 Nipmuc tribesmen surrender to the English colonists in Boston.
- July 30 – Virginia colonist Nathaniel Bacon and his makeshift army issue a Declaration of the People of Virginia, instigating Bacon's Rebellion against the rule of Governor William Berkeley.
- August 2 – Captain Benjamin Church captures Metacomet's wife and son.
- August 12 – King Philip (Metacomet), chief of the Wampanoags that had waged a war throughout southern New England that bore his name, is killed by an Indian named Alderman, a soldier led by Captain Benjamin Church.
- August 17 – Battle of Halmstad (fought at Fyllebro): Sweden gains a decisive victory over Denmark–Norway.
- August 28 – The Irish Donation of 1676 is shipped from Dublin, to relieve Boston in the Massachusetts Bay Colony.
- September 19
  - The Russo-Turkish War (1676–1681) begins, with Russo-Ukrainian troops forcing pro-Ottoman Hetman Ivan Samoylovych to surrender Chyhyryn.
  - Bacon's Rebellion: Jamestown is burned to the ground by the forces of Nathaniel Bacon.
- September 21 – Pope Innocent XI succeeds Pope Clement X, as the 240th Pope of the Roman Catholic Church.

=== October–December ===
- October 13 – Battle of Gegodog: Trunajaya defeats the Mataram Sultanate.
- October 17 – The Treaty of Żurawno is signed, between the Ottoman (Turkish) Empire and Polish–Lithuanian Commonwealth.
- November 16 – A prison is founded on Nantucket Island, in the English colony of Massachusetts.
- November 27 – A fire in Boston, Massachusetts, is accidentally set by a careless and sleepy apprentice, who drops a lighted candle, or leaves it too near some combustible substance; this is the largest fire known at this time in the district. The Rev. Increase Mather’s church, dwelling and a portion of his personal library are destroyed.
- December 4 – Scanian War – Battle of Lund: Sweden defeats the forces of Denmark.
- December 7 – Ole Rømer makes the first quantitative measurements of the speed of light.
- December 21 – Sands baronets created in the Baronetage of Ireland.

=== Date unknown ===
- Emperor Yohannes I of Ethiopia decrees that Muslims must live separately from Christians throughout his realm.
- Anton van Leeuwenhoek discovers microorganisms.
- An Åbo Lantdag (assembly) meets in Turku, Finland.
- The French East India Company founds its principal Indian base at Pondicherry, on the Coromandel Coast.
- The first coffeehouse in North America opens in Boston.

== Births ==
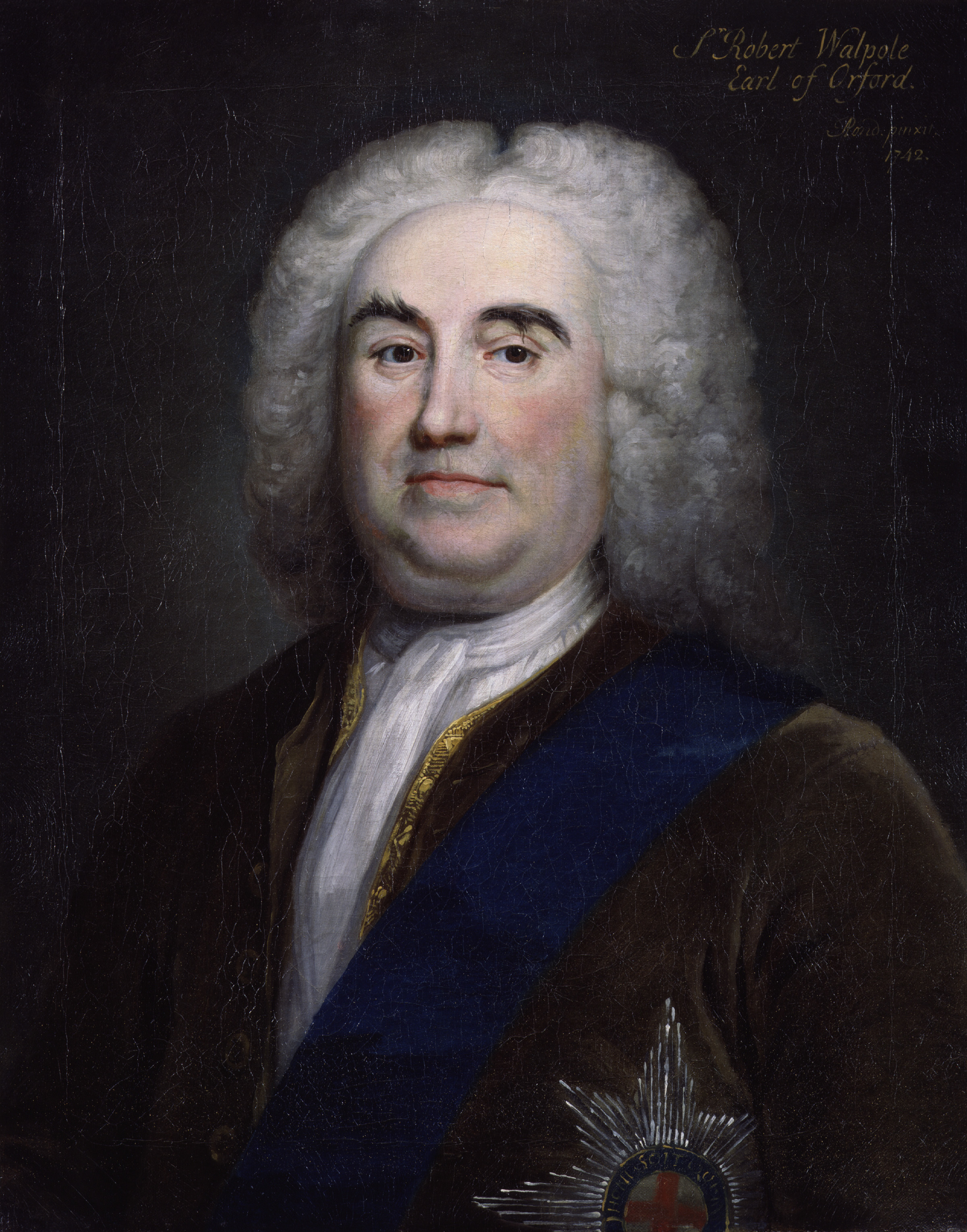
Robert Walpole

- March 17 – Thomas Boston, Scottish church leader (d. 1732)
- March 27 – Francis II Rákóczi, Hungarian rebel against the Habsburgs (d. 1735)
- April 23 – King Frederick I of Sweden (d. 1751)
- May 26 – Maria Clara Eimmart, German astronomer, engraver and designer (d. 1707)
- May 28 – Jacopo Riccati, Italian mathematician (d. 1754)
- June 17 – Louise de Maisonblanche, illegitimate daughter of Louis XIV of France (d. 1718)
- June 21 – Anthony Collins, English philosopher (d. 1729)
- July 3 – Leopold I, Prince of Anhalt-Dessau, Prussian field marshal (d. 1747)
- July 14 – Caspar Abel, German theologian, historian and poet (d. 1763)
- August 26 – Robert Walpole, first Prime Minister of the United Kingdom (d. 1745)
- September 13 – Élisabeth Charlotte d'Orléans, duchess and regent of Lorraine (d. 1744)
- September 18 – Eberhard Louis, Duke of Württemberg (d. 1733)
- October 8 – Benito Jerónimo Feijóo y Montenegro, Spanish scholar (d. 1764)
- October 19 – Rodrigo Anes de Sá Almeida e Meneses, 1st Marquis of Abrantes, Portuguese diplomat (d. 1733)
- November 8 – Louise Bénédicte de Bourbon, duchess of Maine, daughter-in-law of Louis XIV (d. 1753)
- date unknown – Alexander Selkirk, Scottish-born sailor (d. 1721)

== Deaths ==
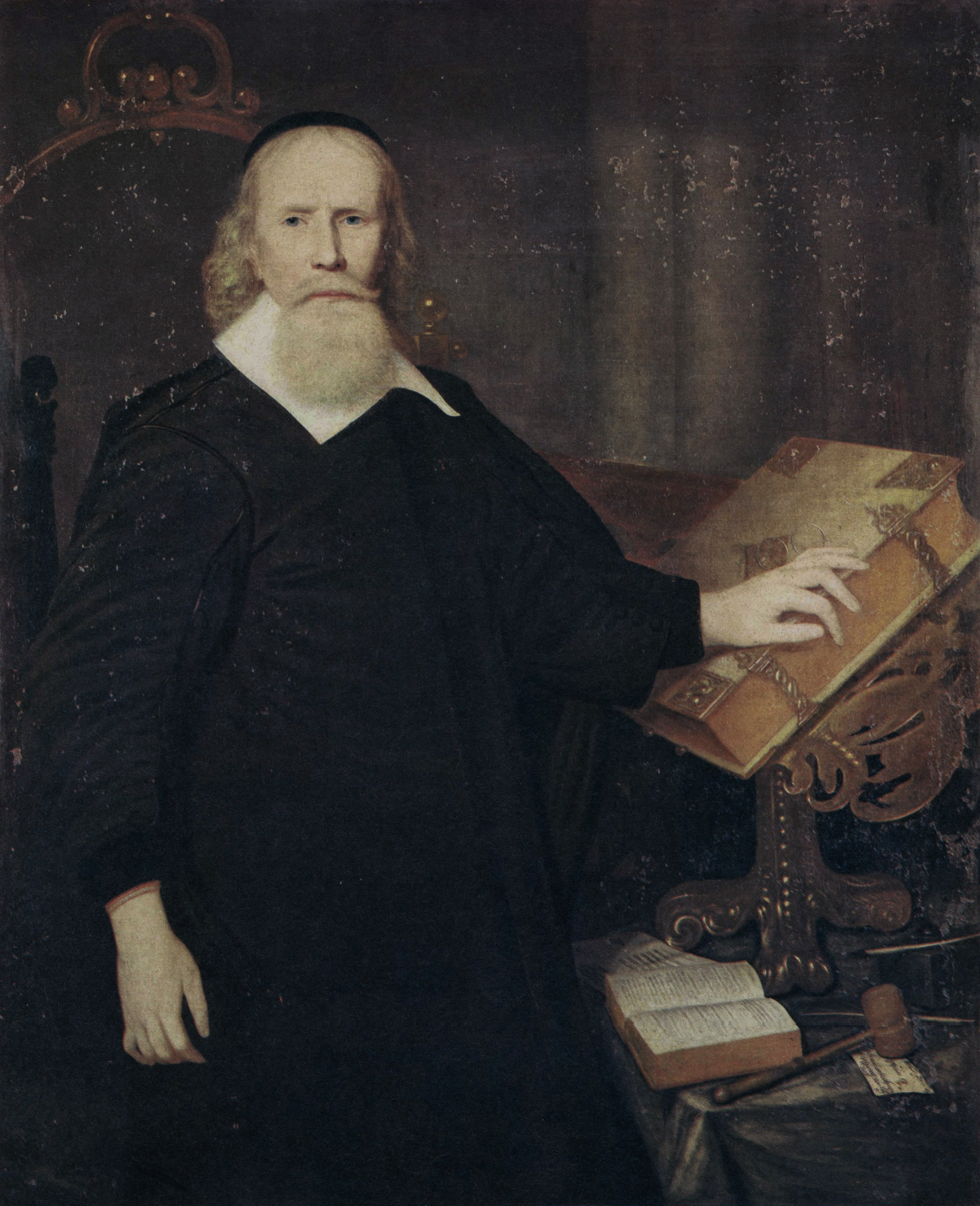
John Clarke

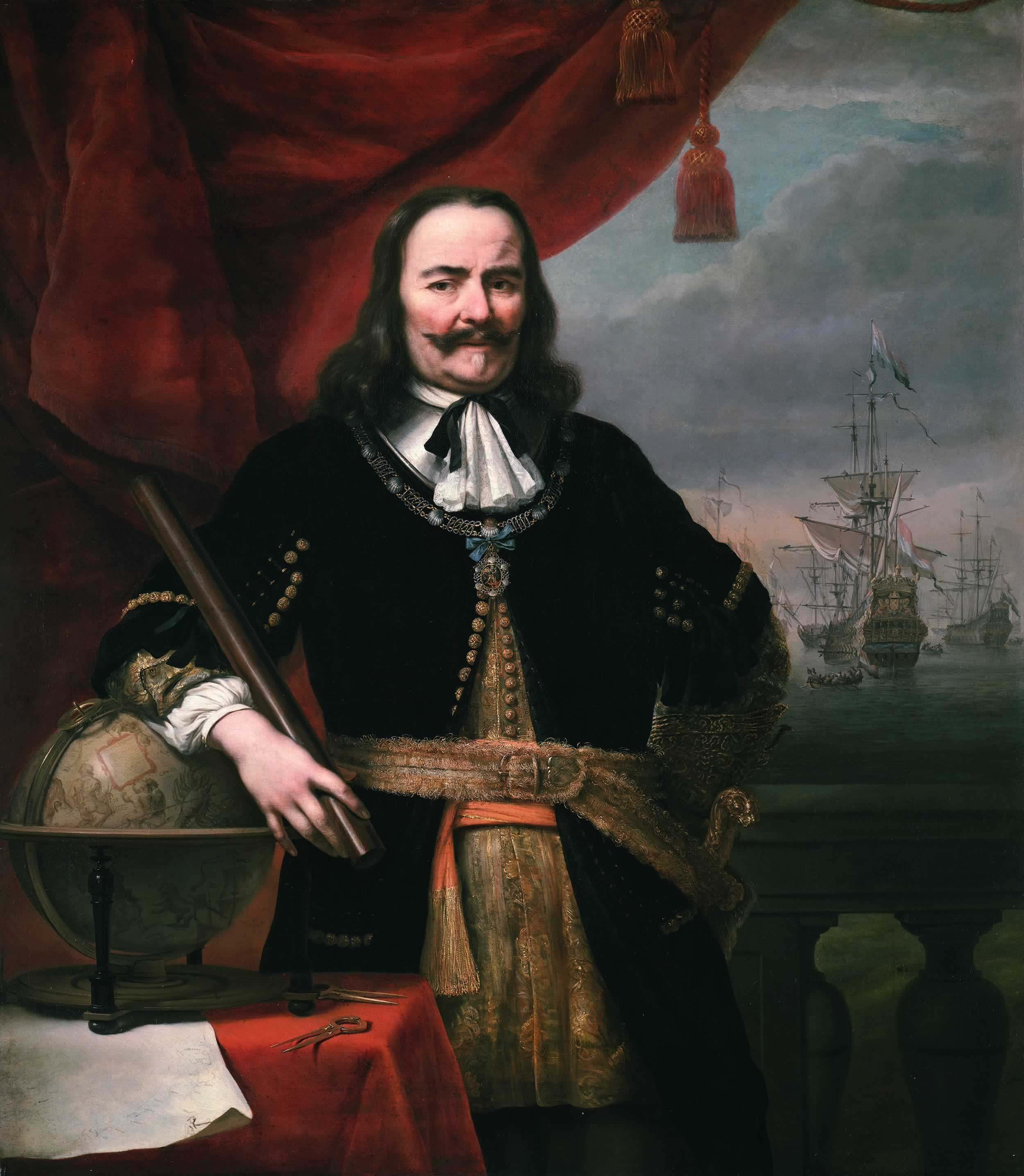
Michiel de Ruyter

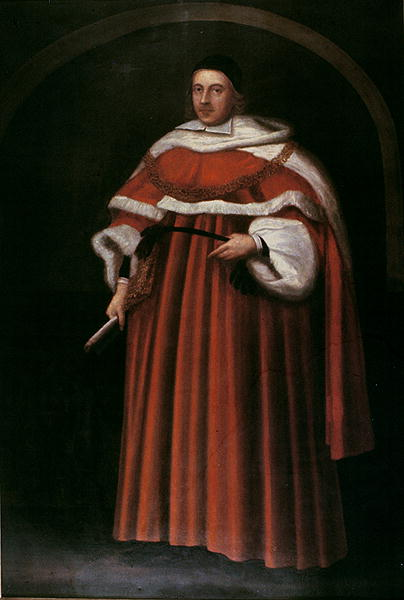
Matthew Hale

- January 7 – Marco Faustini, Italian opera manager (b. 1606)
- January 13 – Isaac Commelin, Dutch historian (b. 1598)
- January 14 – Francesco Cavalli, Italian composer (b. 1602)
- January 16 – Georg Arnold, Austrian musician (b. 1621)
- January 29 – Tsar Alexis of Russia (b. 1629)
- February 3 – François Chauveau, French painter (b. 1613)
- February 14 – Abraham Bosse, French engraver and artist (b. c. 1604)
- February 20 – Hugh Forth, English politician (b. 1610)
- March 2 – Juan de Almoguera, Roman Catholic prelate who served as Archbishop of Lima (1673–1676) and Bishop of Arequipa (1659–1673) (b. 1605)
- March 21 – Henri Sauval, French historian (b. 1623)
- March 22 – Lady Anne Clifford, 14th Baroness de Clifford (b. 1590)
- March 23 – Paul Würtz, Swedish general (b. 1612)
- March 27 – Bernardino de Rebolledo, Spanish poet, soldier and diplomat (b. 1597)
- April 5 – John Winthrop the Younger, Governor of Connecticut (b. 1606)
- April 8 – Claudia Felicitas of Austria, Holy Roman Empress (b. 1653)
- April 20 – John Clarke, English-born Baptist minister, deputy governor of Rhode Island and physician (b. 1609)
- April 29 – Michiel de Ruyter, Dutch admiral (b. 1607)
- May 5 – Sir Richard Lloyd, English politician (b. 1606)
- May 7 – Henri Valois, French historian (b. 1603)
- May 25 – Johann Rahn, Swiss mathematician (b. 1622)
- May 26 – Thomas Rouse, English politician (b. 1608)
- May 27 – Paul Gerhardt, German hymnist (b. 1606)
- June 1 – Karl Kaspar von der Leyen, German Catholic archbishop (b. 1618)
- June 13 – Princess Henriette Adelaide of Savoy, wife of Ferdinand Maria (b. 1636)
- June 16 – Nathaniel Dickinson, American settler (b. 1601)
- June 29 – Hendrik van der Borcht II, German painter (b. 1614)
- July – Jesse Wharton, colonial governor of Maryland
- July 5 – Carl Gustaf Wrangel, Swedish soldier (b. 1613)
- July 8 – Francis I Rákóczi, Hungarian prince of Transylvania (b. 1645)
- July 12 – Duchess Elisabeth Sophie of Mecklenburg, German poet, composer, impresario and (by marriage) Duchess of Brunswick-Lüneburg (b. 1613)
- July 17 – Madame de Brinvilliers, French serial poisoner, executed (b. 1630)
- July 22 – Pope Clement X (b. 1590)
- July 27 – François Hédelin, abbé d'Aubignac, French writer (b. 1604)
- August 11 – Hans Jakob Christoffel von Grimmelshausen, German writer (b. 1621)
- August 14 – Nicolò Sagredo, 105th Doge of Venice (b. 1606)
- August 28 – Margravine Louise Charlotte of Brandenburg, Duchess of Courland by marriage (1645–1676) (b. 1617)
- August 31 – Lars Stigzelius, Swedish Lutheran archbishop (b. 1598)
- September 4 – John Ogilby, Scottish-born impresario and cartographer active in Dublin and London (b. 1600)
- September 9 – Paul de Chomedey, Sieur de Maisonneuve, French military officer, founder of Montreal in New France (b. 1612)
- September 10 – Gerrard Winstanley, English religious reformer (b. 1609)
- September 11 – Anna de' Medici, Archduchess of Austria (b. 1616)
- September 17 – Sabbatai Zevi, Montenegrin rabbi, kabbalist and founder of the Jewish Sabbatean movement (b. 1626)
- September 28 – Anna Maria Antigó, Spanish Catholic nun (b. 1602)
- October 6 – Claudia Rusca, Italian composer, singer and organist (b. 1593)
- October 7 – Richard Neville, English soldier and Member of Parliament (b. 1615)
- October 10 – Sebastian Knüpfer, German composer (b. 1633)
- October 13 – Juan de Arellano, Spanish artist (b. 1614)
- October 15 – Simon de Vos, Flemish painter (b. 1603)
- October 26 – Nathaniel Bacon, Virginian colonist and instigator of Bacon's Rebellion (b. ca 1640s)
- October 28 – Jean Desmarets, French writer (b. 1595)
- November 1 – Gisbertus Voetius, Dutch theologian (b. 1589)
- November 9 – Allart Pieter van Jongestall, Dutch jurist, politician and diplomat (b. 1612)
- November 12 – Shang Kexi, Chinese general (b. 1604)
- December 11 – Roland Fréart de Chambray, French writer (b. 1606)
- December 12 – William Morice, English politician (b. 1602)
- December 18 – Edward Benlowes, English poet (b. 1603)
- December 19 – Adolph, Prince of Nassau-Schaumburg and Count of Nassau-Schaumburg (1653–1676) (b. 1629)
- December 25
  - Matthew Hale, Lord Chief Justice of England (b. 1609)
  - William Cavendish, 1st Duke of Newcastle-upon-Tyne, English soldier, politician and writer (b. 1592)
