= Fuhayd ibn Hasan =

Emir of Mecca
- Reign: Nov 1603 – Jul 1610
- Predecessor: Abu Talib ibn Hasan
- Successors: Idris ibn Hasan; Muhsin ibn Husayn
- Partners: Idris ibn Hasan; Muhsin ibn Husayn
- Died: 1611/1612; Istanbul, Ottoman Empire (in present-day Turkey)
- House: Banu Hasan; Banu Qatadah
- Father: Hasan ibn Abi Numayy

Fuhayd ibn Ḥasan ibn Abī Numayy (Arabic: فهيد بن حسن بن أبي نمي) was Emir of Mecca in partnership with his brother Idris ibn Hasan and his nephew Muhsin ibn Husayn from 1603 to 1610.

Fuhayd and Muhsin assumed the Emirate in partnership with Idris in Jumada II 1012 AH (November 1603), by decision of the ashraf. They were included in the du'a alongside Idris, and were together allotted one quarter of the income of the Hejaz due to the Emir of Mecca. Sultan Ahmed I confirmed the appointment of the three sharifs in a decree that was read out in the Masjid al-Haram on Wednesday, 11 Safar 1013 AH (7 July 1604).

In late Rabi II 1019 AH (July 1610), Idris and Muhsin deposed Fuhayd and exiled him from Mecca. After the Hajj season he journeyed to Egypt and then to Istanbul. He met Sultan Ahmed I, and according to some reports the Sultan granted him the Emirate of Mecca. He died in Istanbul in 1020 AH (1611/1612). The year of his death is recorded numerically in the poet's verse:

مات بالروم فهيد بن الحسن / Died in Rome, Fuhayd ibn al-Hasan

== Sources ==
- al-Ghāzī, ‘Abd Allāh ibn Muḥammad (2009) [Composed 1930]. ‘Abd al-Malik ibn ‘Abd Allāh ibn Duhaysh (ed.). Ifādat al-anām إفادة الأنام (in Arabic). Vol. 3 (1st ed.). Makkah: Maktabat al-Asadī.
- al-Sinjārī, ‘Alī ibn Tāj al-Dīn ibn Taqī al-Dīn (1998) [Composed 1713]. al-Miṣrī, Jamīl ‘Abd Allāh Muḥammad (ed.). Manā'iḥ al-karam fī akhbār Makkah wa'l-Bayt wa-wulāt al-Ḥaram منائح الكرم في أخبار مكة والبيت وولاة الحرم (in Arabic). Vol. 3 (1st ed.). Makkah: Jāmi‘at Umm al-Qurá.
- al-‘Aṣimī, ‘Abd al-Malik ibn Ḥusayn (1998) [Composed before 1700]. ‘Ādil Aḥmad ‘Abd al-Mawjūd; ‘Alī Muḥammad Mu‘awwaḍ (eds.). Samṭ al-nujūm al-'awālī fī anbā' al-awā'il wa-al-tawālī سمط النجوم العوالي في أنباء الأوائل والتوالي (in Arabic). Vol. 4. Bayrūt: Dār al-Kutub al-‘Ilmīyah.
- Uzunçarşılı, İsmail Hakkı (2003) [First published in Turkish in 1972]. Ashrāf Makkat al-Mukarramah wa-umarāʼihā fī al-ʻahd al-ʻUthmānī أشراف مكة المكرمة وأمرائها في العهد العثماني (in Arabic). Translated by Murād, Khalīl ʻAlī (1st ed.). Bayrūt: al-Dār al-‘Arabīyah lil-Mawsū‘āt.
- de Zambaur, E. (1927). Manuel de généalogie et de chronologie pour l'histoire de l'Islam (in French). Hanovre: Heinz Lafaire. p. 22.
