= Idris ibn Hasan =

Emir of Mecca
- Reign: Nov 1603 – Oct 1624
- Predecessor: Abu Talib ibn Hasan
- Successor: Muhsin ibn Husayn
- Co-Emirs: Fuhayd ibn Hasan; Muhsin ibn Husayn
- Born: May/June 1567; Hejaz (in present-day Saudi Arabia)
- Died: Jabal Shammar (in present-day Ha'il Region, Saudi Arabia)
- Burial: Yatab, near Ha'il; Jabal Shammar
- House: Banu Hasan; Banu Qatadah
- Father: Hasan ibn Abi Numayy
- Mother: Hana? bint Ahmad

Abū ‘Awn Idrīs ibn Ḥasan ibn Abī Numayy (Arabic: أبو عون إدريس بن حسن بن أبي نمي) was Emir of Mecca and ruler of the Hejaz from 1603 to 1624.

== Biography ==
Idris was born in Dhu al-Qi'dah 974 AH (May/June 1567), during the joint reign of his father Sharif Hasan and his grandfather Sharif Muhammad Abu Numayy II. His mother was Hana—or Haya—bint Ahmad ibn Humaydah. His kunyah was Abu Awn.

=== Reign ===
After his father's death in Jumada II 1010 AH (November 1601) Idris traveled to Istanbul and resided there for some time. He returned to the Hejaz during the reign of his brother, Sharif Abu Talib ibn Hasan. In Jumada II 1012 AH (November 1603) Abu Talib died, and the ashraf elected Idris as Emir with his brother Fuhayd ibn Hasan and his nephew Muhsin ibn Husayn as co-rulers. Both were included in the du'a alongside Idris, and were together allotted one quarter of the Emirate's income. Sultan Ahmed I ratified the decision and sent the customary khil'ah (robe of honor) and diploma from Istanbul. The royal proclamation was read out in the Masjid al-Haram on Wednesday, 11 Safar 1013 AH (7 July 1604).

In late Rabi II 1019 AH (July 1610), Idris and Muhsin deposed Fuhayd and exiled him from Mecca.

=== Deposition ===
In 1033 AH (1624) a dispute occurred between Idris and Muhsin. In the end, Muhsin convened the ahl al-hall wal-aqd from the ashraf, scholars, jurists, and notables of Mecca, and they decided to remove Idris from office. On Thursday, 4 Muharram 1034 AH (16 October 1624) fighting broke out as Muhsin was proclaimed sole Emir of Mecca. That night a ceasefire was enacted that allowed Idris to stay in Mecca for a few months. On Friday the khutbah was made in the name of Sharif Muhsin alone.

=== Exile and death ===
Idris fell ill in Safar 1034 (November/December 1624) and left Mecca in poor health on the night of 12 Rabi I (c. 22 December). He died in the Jabal Shammar region on 14 Jumada II (c. 24 March 1625) or 17 Jumada II (c. 27 March), according to different sources, and was buried at Yatab. News of his death reached Mecca in early Rajab (April), and salat al-gha'ib (the funeral prayer in absentia) was offered for him in the Masjid al-Haram.

== Sources ==
- al-Ghāzī, ‘Abd Allāh ibn Muḥammad (2009) [Composed 1930]. ‘Abd al-Malik ibn ‘Abd Allāh ibn Duhaysh (ed.). Ifādat al-anām إفادة الأنام (in Arabic). Vol. 3 (1st ed.). Makkah: Maktabat al-Asadī.
- al-Sinjārī, ‘Alī ibn Tāj al-Dīn ibn Taqī al-Dīn (1998) [Composed 1713]. al-Miṣrī, Jamīl ‘Abd Allāh Muḥammad (ed.). Manā'iḥ al-karam fī akhbār Makkah wa'l-Bayt wa-wulāt al-Ḥaram منائح الكرم في أخبار مكة والبيت وولاة الحرم (in Arabic). Vol. 3 (1st ed.). Makkah: Jāmi‘at Umm al-Qurá.
- al-‘Aṣimī, ‘Abd al-Malik ibn Ḥusayn (1998) [Composed before 1700]. ‘Ādil Aḥmad ‘Abd al-Mawjūd; ‘Alī Muḥammad Mu‘awwaḍ (eds.). Samṭ al-nujūm al-'awālī fī anbā' al-awā'il wa-al-tawālī سمط النجوم العوالي في أنباء الأوائل والتوالي (in Arabic). Vol. 4. Bayrūt: Dār al-Kutub al-‘Ilmīyah.
- Uzunçarşılı, İsmail Hakkı (2003) [First published in Turkish in 1972]. Ashrāf Makkat al-Mukarramah wa-umarāʼihā fī al-ʻahd al-ʻUthmānī أشراف مكة المكرمة وأمرائها في العهد العثماني (in Arabic). Translated by Murād, Khalīl ʻAlī (1st ed.). Bayrūt: al-Dār al-‘Arabīyah lil-Mawsū‘āt.
- Hicaz vilayeti salnamesi حجاز ولايتى سالنامه‌سى [Hejaz Vilayet Yearbook] (in Ottoman Turkish) (5th ed.). Hicaz: Vilayet Matbaası [Vilayet Printing House]. 1892. p. 117. hdl:2027/mdp.39015049569422.
- de Zambaur, E. (1927). Manuel de généalogie et de chronologie pour l'histoire de l'Islam (in French). Hanovre: Heinz Lafaire. p. 22.
