= Battle of Neu Titschein =

1621 battle of the Thirty Years' War

Coordinates: 49°35′N 18°00′E

Battle of Neu Titschein (Nový Jičín)
- Part of the Thirty Years War
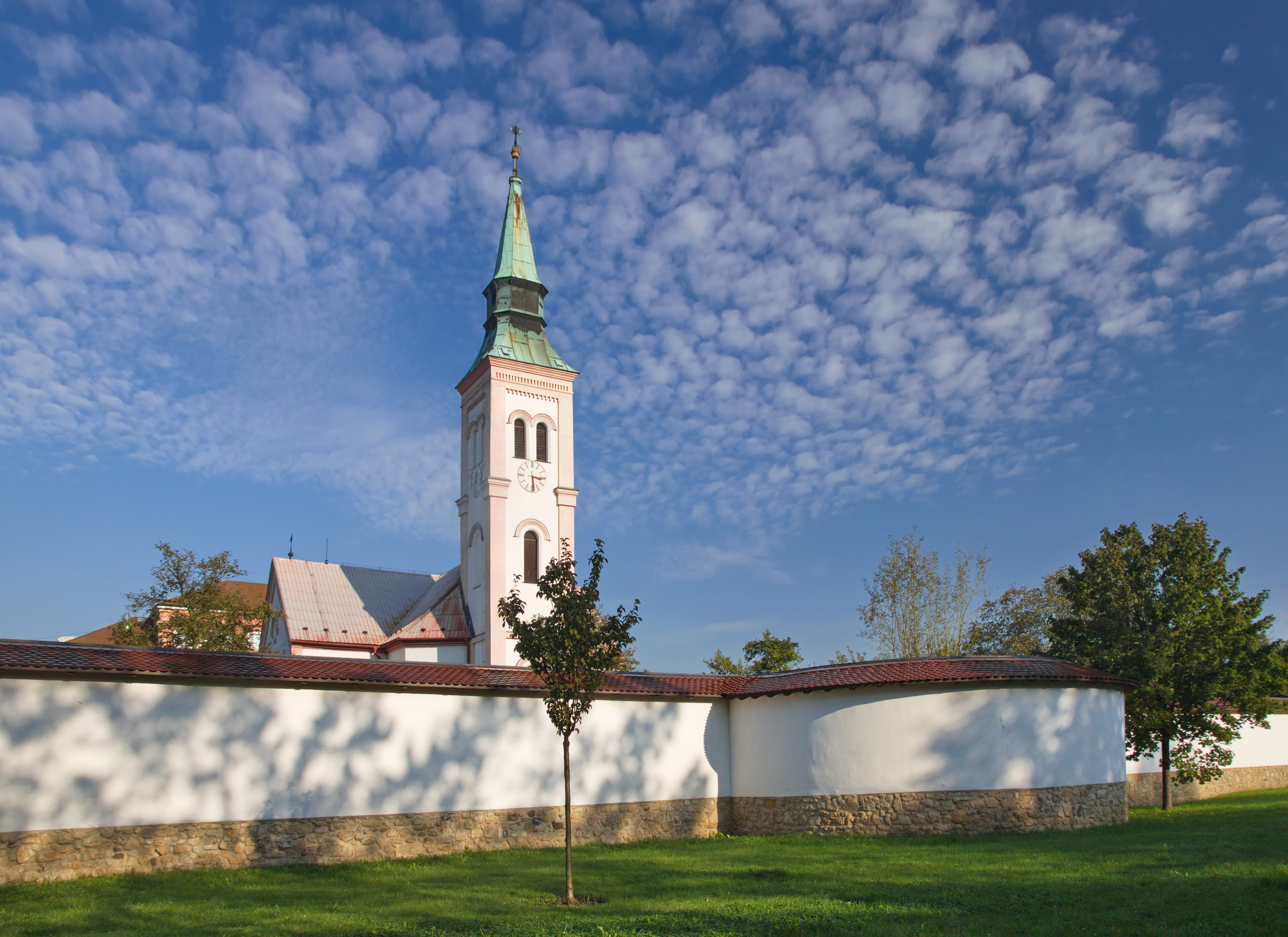
Date	25 July 1621
Location	Nový Jičín / Neu Titschein (present-day Czech Republic)
Result	Protestant victory

Belligerents
(Kingdom of Bohemia) Confederates: Silesian Protestants	Catholic League; Spanish Empire

Commanders and leaders
(Kingdom of Bohemia) Jägerndorf	Jean de Gauchier

Strength
Less than 10,000	2,000

Casualties and losses
Unknown	More than 500 dead
- Location within Czech Republic

The Battle of Neu Titschein or Titschein (Moravia, now Nový Jičín, Czech Republic) was fought on 25 July 1621 during the Thirty Years' War between the Roman Catholic forces of Jean de Gauchier and the Protestant army of Johann Georg von Brandenburg, Duke of Jägerndorf.

After the defeat of the Bohemian Protestant army in the battle of White mountain, part of its forces remained in Silesia. The Duke of Jägerndorf, a Protestant leader in Silesia, decided to restore Protestant power in the Bohemian kingdom. In the northeastern part of nearby Moravia, Protestant Wallachians fought against Roman Catholics, and further east in Slovakia (Upper Hungary) Protestants attempted to ally with forces of Hungarian prince Gabor Bethlen.

At Neutitschein, a strong Catholic force was assembled and engaged the Protestant forces which had occupied towns and castles in Silesia and northern Moravia. During the battle, a huge fire started and all suburbs of Neutitschein burned down. This fire prevented the Catholic forces to successfully defend the town and only a small part of them, led by Jean de Gauchier, escaped to Olomouc (Olmütz), leaving northern Moravia under Protestant control. Yet, since the Protestant forces were unable to conquer Olomouc and occupy all of Moravia, the Duke of Jägerndorf decided to move to Slovakia to join forces with Gabor Bethlen.
