= Muhsin ibn Husayn =

Muḥsin ibn Ḥusayn محسن بن حسين

Emir of Mecca
- Reign: November 1603 – 21 May 1628
- Predecessor: Abu Talib ibn Hasan
- Successor: Ahmad ibn Abd al-Muttalib
- Co-Emirs: Idris ibn Hasan (1603–1610); Fuhayd ibn Hasan (1603–1624)
- Born: August or September 1576; Mecca, Hejaz
- Died: 29 April 1629; Near Sanaa, Yemen
- Burial: Sanaa, Yemen
- House: Banu Qatadah
- Father: Husayn ibn Hasan

Muḥsin ibn Ḥusayn ibn Ḥasan ibn Abī Numayy (Arabic: محسن بن حسين بن حسن بن أبي نمي) was Emir of Mecca and ruler of the Hejaz in partnership with Idris ibn Hasan from 1603 to 1624, then independently from 1624 to 1628.

Muhsin was born in Jumada I 984 AH (August/September 1576). He was raised by his uncle Abu Talib ibn Hasan.

After the death of Sharif Abu Talib in Jumada II 1012 AH (November 1603), the ashraf of Mecca elected Idris ibn Hasan as Emir, with his brother Fuhayd and nephew Muhsin as co-Emirs. Fuhayd and Muhsin were included in the du'a alongside Idris, and were together allotted a quarter of the Emirate's income. Sultan Ahmed I confirmed the appointment of the three sharifs, and sent a decree that was read out in the Masjid al-Haram on Wednesday, 11 Safar 1013 AH (7 July 1604).

In late Rabi II 1019 AH (July 1610), Idris and Muhsin deposed Fuhayd.

On Thursday, 4 Muharram 1034 AH (16 October 1624) the ashraf deposed Idris and proclaimed Muhsin as sole Emir of Mecca. He received an official decree from Sultan Murad IV in Ramadan (June 1625).

In mid-Ramadan 1037 AH (May 1628) Muhsin surrendered the Emirate to Ahmad ibn Abd al-Muttalib, then departed to Yemen. He died near Sanaa on 6 Ramadan 1038 AH (29 April 1629). He was buried in Sanaa, and a qubba was built over his grave.

== Sources ==
- al-Ghāzī, ‘Abd Allāh ibn Muḥammad (2009) [Composed 1930]. ‘Abd al-Malik ibn ‘Abd Allāh ibn Duhaysh (ed.). Ifādat al-anām إفادة الأنام (in Arabic). Vol. 3 (1st ed.). Makkah: Maktabat al-Asadī.
- al-Sinjārī, ‘Alī ibn Tāj al-Dīn ibn Taqī al-Dīn (1998) [Composed 1713]. al-Miṣrī, Jamīl ‘Abd Allāh Muḥammad (ed.). Manā'iḥ al-karam fī akhbār Makkah wa'l-Bayt wa-wulāt al-Ḥaram منائح الكرم في أخبار مكة والبيت وولاة الحرم (in Arabic). Vol. 3 (1st ed.). Makkah: Jāmi‘at Umm al-Qurá.
- Uzunçarşılı, İsmail Hakkı (2003) [First published in Turkish in 1972]. Ashrāf Makkat al-Mukarramah wa-umarāʼihā fī al-ʻahd al-ʻUthmānī أشراف مكة المكرمة وأمرائها في العهد العثماني (in Arabic). Translated by Murād, Khalīl ʻAlī (1st ed.). Bayrūt: al-Dār al-‘Arabīyah lil-Mawsū‘āt.
- de Zambaur, E. (1927). Manuel de généalogie et de chronologie pour l'histoire de l'Islam (in French). Hanovre: Heinz Lafaire. p. 22.
  Muḥsin ibn Ḥusayn ibn Ḥasan ibn Abī Numayy Banu Qatadah
  Regnal titles
  Preceded by Abu Talib ibn Hasan	Emir of Mecca; November 1603 – 21 May 1628	Succeeded by Ahmad ibn Abd al-Muttalib
