= Claude Maltret =

French Jesuit (1621–1674)

Claude Maltret (French pronunciation: [klod maltʁɛ]; 3 October 1621 – 3 January 1674) was a French Jesuit.

== Biography ==
Maltret was born at Puy in Savoy, Kingdom of France. He entered the Society of Jesus on 12 October 1637. Upon the completion of his studies, he was engaged for eleven years in teaching belles-lettres and rhetoric and became widely known as a classical scholar. He was then appointed to a professorship in Sacred Scripture, a position which he held for the next nine years.

In 1662, he was made rector of the College of Montauban. From 1672 to 1674, Maltret was rector of the novitiate of Toulouse, where he died.

== Works ==
In 1663, Maltret published an edition of the histories of Procopius with critical commentary. This work went through many editions, being edited and augmented with notes by other scholars, and was included in the Synopsis Historiae Byzantinae, published at Venice.

Maltret's principal works are the following:

- Procopii Caesariensis Historiarum Libri VIII.
- Procopii Caesariensis Arcana Historia. Qui est. fiber nonus Historiarum. This is an edition, with critical notes, of the Latin translation of Procopius, made by Nicolaus Alemannus. In the preface of this work, Maltret promised a translation, with comments, of a Greek poem by Paulus Silentiarus entitled Descriptio Ecclesiae Santae Sophiae. This translation, however, was never published, and it is not known whether it was ever completed.
- Procopii Caesariensis Historiarum sui temporis de bello Gothico libri quatuor.
