= Sands baronets =

Extinct baronetcy in the Baronetage of Ireland

The Sands Baronetcy, of Blackhall, Kildare, was a title in the Baronetage of Ireland. It was created on 21 December 1676 for William Sands, High Sheriff of Kildare at the time. The title became extinct on the death of the second Baronet in circa 1704.

== Sands baronets, of Blackhall (1676) ==
- Sir William Sands, 1st Baronet (died 1687)
- Sir John Sands, 2nd Baronet (died c. 1704)
