= Friedrich Werner =

See also Zacharias Werner

Friedrich Werner (Gottleuba, Pirna, 3 October 1621 - 1660s?) was a German cornettist under Heinrich Schütz at the Dresden court. He was the brother of the Danzig cantor Christoph Werner (1617-1650).
