= Serafina of God =

Italian Carmelite and founder

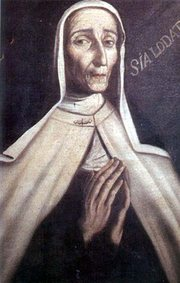
Portrait of Serafina of God

Serafina of God, OCarm, (Italian: Serafina di Dio), also known as Seraphine of Capri, (24 October 1621 – 17 March 1699) an Italian Carmelite who was the founder of seven Carmelite convents of the ancient observance in Southern Italy. The cause for her beatification has been formally accepted by the Holy See, which has declared her to have lived a life of heroic virtue.

== Life ==
Serafina was born as Prudentia Pisa in Naples, then capital of the Kingdom of Naples, on 24 October 1621 into a wealthy merchant family which moved to the island of Capri when she was still a child. She developed a great love of the Lives of the Christian martyrs. As a teenager she refused a marriage proposed by her father and was expelled from the family home for a period of several years, having to live in the equivalent of a chicken coop in the back yard, and her mother would sneak food to her when the father wasn't taking notice. From the age of 15, she would visit and minister to the sick and this ministry would continue notably during the Neapolitan plague of 1656 which took her own mother's life.

After the death of an uncle who had been a priest from this same plague, Prudentia continued her plans for a contemplative convent on the island of Capri, for which she recruited several women from Naples. On 29 May 1661, in the Naples Cathedral, she and her companions made the vows in the Carmelite order, and Prudentia assumed the religious name Serafina of God.

On the following 2 October the women took up residence in the house Pisa's uncle had left her. When that house grew too small for the developing community, a new and elaborate monastery dedicated to the Most Holy Saviour was consecrated in 1675. Mother Serafina was to eventually found seven monasteries in the Naples area and several elsewhere in Italy.

In her prayer life and mysticism, Pisa was often compared to Teresa of Avila, to whom she had a strong devotion, in the deep mystical graces she experienced. She also believed that the best guarantee of authenticity of one's religious experience was a dogged faithfulness to the traditional forms. Thus she had her communities followed a stricter commitment to the Liturgy of the Hours than was common among many monastic communities of the period. Some of the nuns, however, were not as fervent as she, and a resistance began which gathered momentum to the extent that, at the end of her life, she was rejected by the majority of the community she had founded.

At one stage she was accused of quietism, even though she had written a document pointing out the errors of this heretical movement. Because of this accusation, in 1691 the local Inquisition confined her to her cell for two and a half years without the Blessed Sacrament. She was eventually released through the intercession of Cardinal Orsini, later Pope Benedict XIII, a lifelong friend.

When Serafina was taken ill, the nuns refused to visit her, even though she continually asked for them. Two days before her death, she asked the prioress to look after the nuns who had been so contrary to her, making excuses for their behaviour.

Pisa was as notable as a mystic as she was for her practical energy and ability. After her death her cause for beatification was begun. To date she has been named venerable.

== Sources ==
- Douglas, Norman, Siren Land, Penguin books, Harmondsworth (1948). Although he seems to display an anti-Catholic bias, Douglas in Siren Land on page 142 provides reference to additional sources: "An authoritative, religious biography of Sister Serafina di Dio, the Christian ornament of these regions (Capri), was published at Naples in 1723, and further details concerning her can be gleaned from certain Positiones super Dubio – ecclesiastical writings printed at various times with a view to procuring her beatification and containing statements as to her life and habits made by eye-witnesses under oath."
