= Georg Arnold =

Austrian musician

Georg Arnold (23 April 1621 in Feldsberg – 16 January 1676 in Bamberg) was an Austrian composer and organist.

From 1649 he was court organist in Bamberg at the court of Fürstbischof Melchior Otto Voit von Salzburg.

== Works ==
=== Vocal music ===
- Liber primus sacrarum cantionum for 2-5 voices and instruments (Nürnberg, 1651)
- Operis secundi liber I missarum, psalmorum et Magnificat for 5 voices and instruments (Innsbruck, 1656)
- Liber II sacrarum cantionum for 4–7 voices and instruments (Innsbruck, 1661)
- Psalmi de Beata Maria Virgine for 3 voices and instruments (Innsbruck, 1662)
- Psalmi vespertini for 2 solo voices, ripieno choir and Instruments (Bamberg, 1663)
- Opus sextum. Tres missae pro defunctis et alia missa laudativa for 4–7 voices and instruments (Bamberg, 1665)
- Mottetae tredecim selectissimae de nomine Jesu for solo voice and instruments (Kempten, 1672)
- Prima pars. Quatuor missae for 4 voices and instruments (Bamberg, 1672/1673), republished as Missarum quaternio (Bamberg, 1675)

=== Instrumental music ===
- Canzoni, ariae et sonatae for 1-4 violins, Violas and Bc. (Innsbruck, 1659)
