= Joachim Andreas von Schlick =

Czech nobleman (1569–1621)

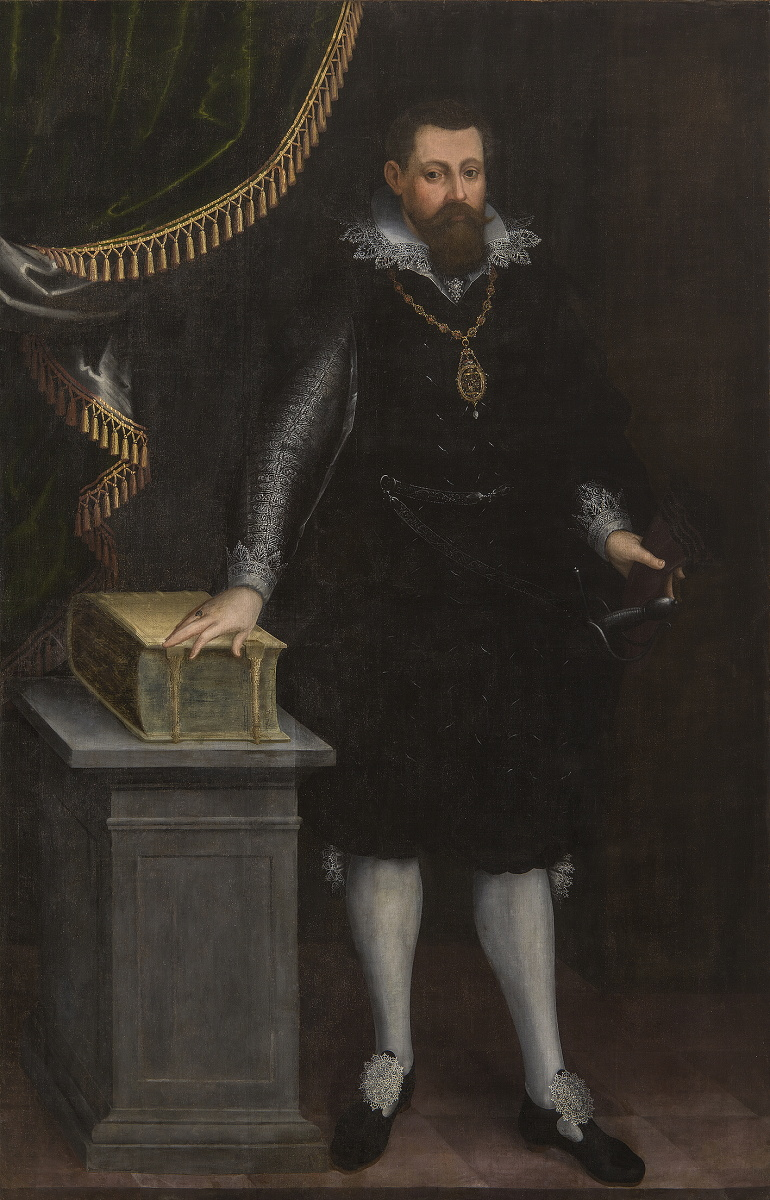
Joachim Andreas von Schlick

Joachim Andreas von Schlick, Count of Passaun and Weißkirchen (in Czech Jáchym Ondřej Šlik z Holíče, hrabě z Passaunu; 9 September 1569, in Ostrov – 21 June 1621, in Prague) was a Bohemian nobleman of the Schlick family in the Kingdom of Bohemia and the Holy Roman Empire. He was one of the leaders of the Protestant estates general in Bohemia and was executed in Prague in 1621 during the Old Town Square executions. He now rests in the Church of the Assumption of the Virgin Mary in Most.

== Youth ==
He studied at the University of Jena, where he worked for several years as its rector, and worked for nine years at the Dresden court as an educator of Saxon princes (e.g., John George, who during the rebellion, served as Elector of Saxony).

== Uprising ==
He was involved since 1608 in the negotiations between the rebellious Bohemian estates, and it was he who convinced Silesia and Lausitz to join the Bohemian revolt. He was one of the leading representatives of the Lutheran wing of the rebel states. During the Battle of White Mountain he did not command a regiment of Moravian German mercenaries, as is sometimes erroneously stated. In fact, the Moravian Regiment was commanded by his relative, Colonel Count Heinrich von Schlick. The latter later had a successful career as imperial Field Marshal and president of the Vienna court war council. Heinrich von Schlick died in 1650.

During the reign of Matthias of Habsburg in 1611, Joachim von Schlick became a royal marshal. Then from the "Winter King" Frederick V, Elector Palatine, to whose election he had contributed, he received the Office of High Court judge. He participated in the Second Prague Defenestration and was probably one of the people who threw the Habsburg officials from the window of Prague Castle.

== Prior to execution ==
Before his execution, he managed to write a letter to the Saxon agent in Prague, Bartholomew Brunner, his old friend, who had promised to deliver it to the Provincial Commissioner, Prince Charles of Lichtenstein. At that time, Schlick served as reeve or bailiff, as appointed by the fugitive King Frederick of the Palatinate.

The letter of 17 January 1621 is intended as a supplication to Lichtenstein, who was a relative of Schlick's wife, asking him to intercede with the Emperor in hopes that a public apology would save him. Moreover, he offered to help to justify the expulsion of Frederick. The letter was, in effect, a confession and a renunciation of his prior beliefs and actions. After a short time in exile, Schlick returned to Bohemia and was caught hiding with his nephew Christopher. Schlick's wife tried unsuccessfully to save him, and Schlick was sentenced to death, along with the loss of his honor and property.

== Execution ==
He was executed 21 June 1621 at the Old Town Square in Prague, along with 26 other nobles, knights and civic leaders who had supported the Protestant regime. His right hand was cut off, then he was beheaded. The original sentence, however, was quartering alive. This execution became known as the execution of 27 Bohemian Lords. He was executed first. Executioner Jan Mydlář hung Schlick's head with his hand laid on his mouth at the Old Town Bridge Tower. His confiscated estates and property were sold soon afterwards.

== Body ==
In May 1622, after frequent pleas from Countess Schlick, Charles of Lichtenstein allowed Joachim Schlick's head and hand to be recovered and buried with his body in the crypt under the pulpit at St. Salvator in Prague Old Town. His tomb was desecrated and emptied during the Saxon invasion of Bohemia during the Thirty Years' War. His skull was recovered and kept by his family. It was reburied in the early 19th century.
