= Jan Mydlář =

Czech executioner (c.1572–1664)

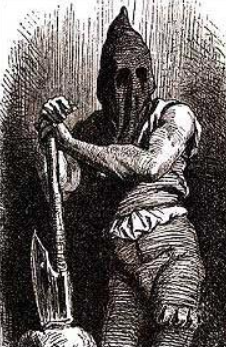
- Born: c. 1572; Chrudim, Bohemia (probably)
- Died: 14 March 1664
- Occupation: Executioner
- Title: Headsman

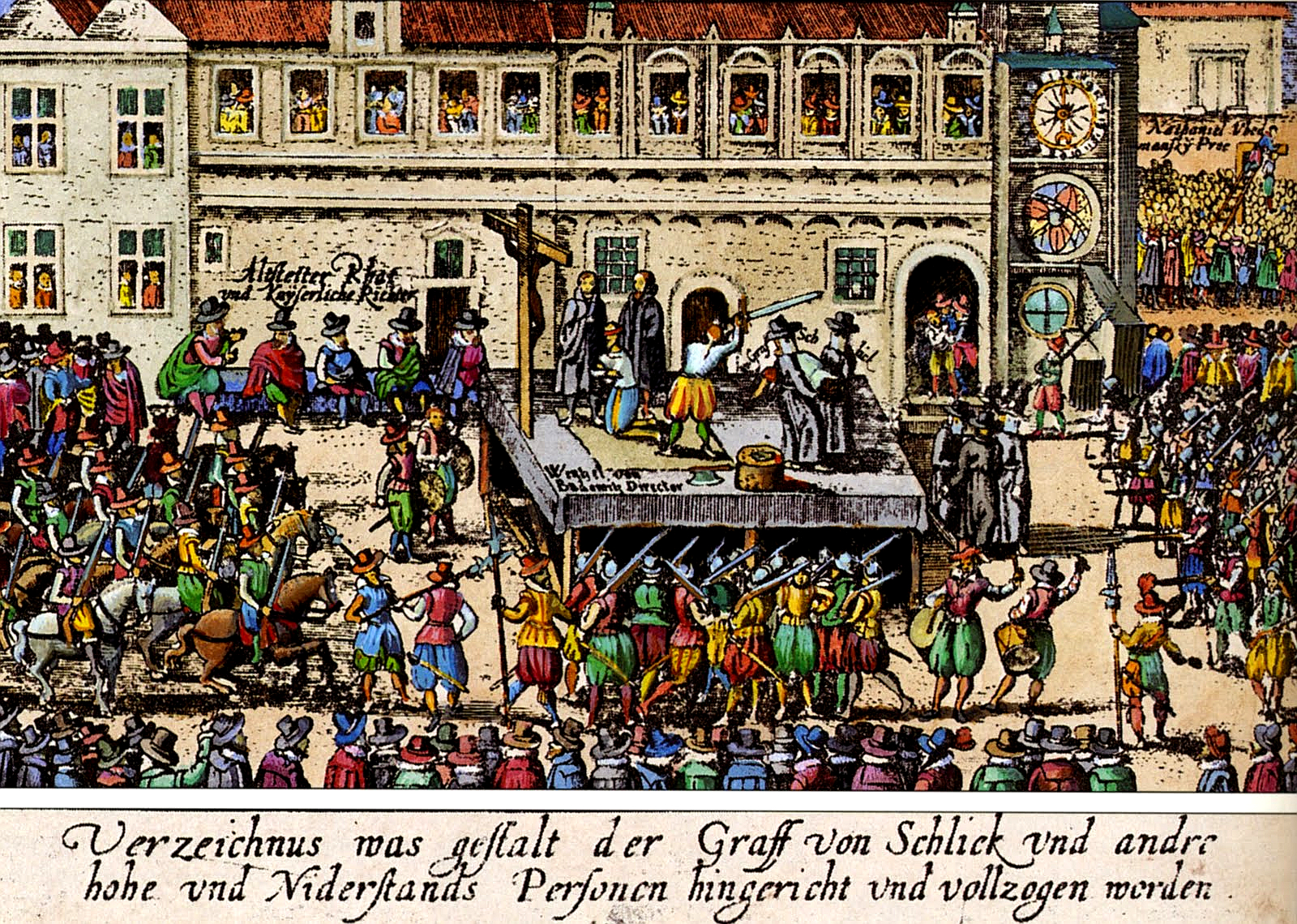
Execution of 27 Bohemian Revolt leaders, Old Town Square, Prague, 21 June 1621

Jan Mydlář (c. 1572 – 14 March 1664) was a Czech executioner known for carrying out the Old Town Square execution of 27 Bohemian Revolt leaders. He is known for the red hood he donned when performing executions.

== Life ==
Jan Mydlář was born probably in 1572, probably in Chrudim. He studied physics and Latin at the University of Prague, but the reasons why he became an executioner are unclear. He was married twice. He had a son, Jan Václav and a daughter, Magdalena, with his first wife. In 1634, Mydlář ended his career as an executioner, bought a house in New Town, Prague and became a knacker. His son Jan Václav took over the post of executioner from his father and held it until his death in 1672. Mydlář's son Jiří from his second marriage also became an executioner, as did his grandsons Jan and Daniel. Jan Mydlář died on 14 March 1664, at the age of at least 90.

== Old Town Square execution ==
Mydlář carried out the Old Town Square execution of 27 Bohemian Revolt leaders in 1621. These leaders were men of high importance, representing various ranks in the society and professions of Bohemia. They had organized an uprising against the Habsburg Emperor Matthias and later Ferdinand II.

On 21 June 1621, Mydlář executed the 27 men on behalf of the House of Habsburg. There were 3 lords, 7 knights and other important men of the land. He beheaded 12 of the men using four swords. He beheaded them without using a block; just a single swing of the sword. He would have lost his job and his reputation if he had needed two sword strokes. He used a new, sharp sword when executing his friend Jan Jesenius, an educated man. Jessenius also happened to be a spokesperson for the noblemen. Mydlář had to cut out Jessenius's tongue first, then behead him, then quarter his body.
