= Hošťálek =

Hošťálek is a Czech surname. Notable people with this surname include:

- Antonín Hošťálek (born 1950), Czech journalist
- Maxmilián Hošťálek (1564–1621), Czech mayor, executed
- Ondřej Hošťálek (born 1991), Czech ice hockey player
