= Maxmilián Hošťálek =

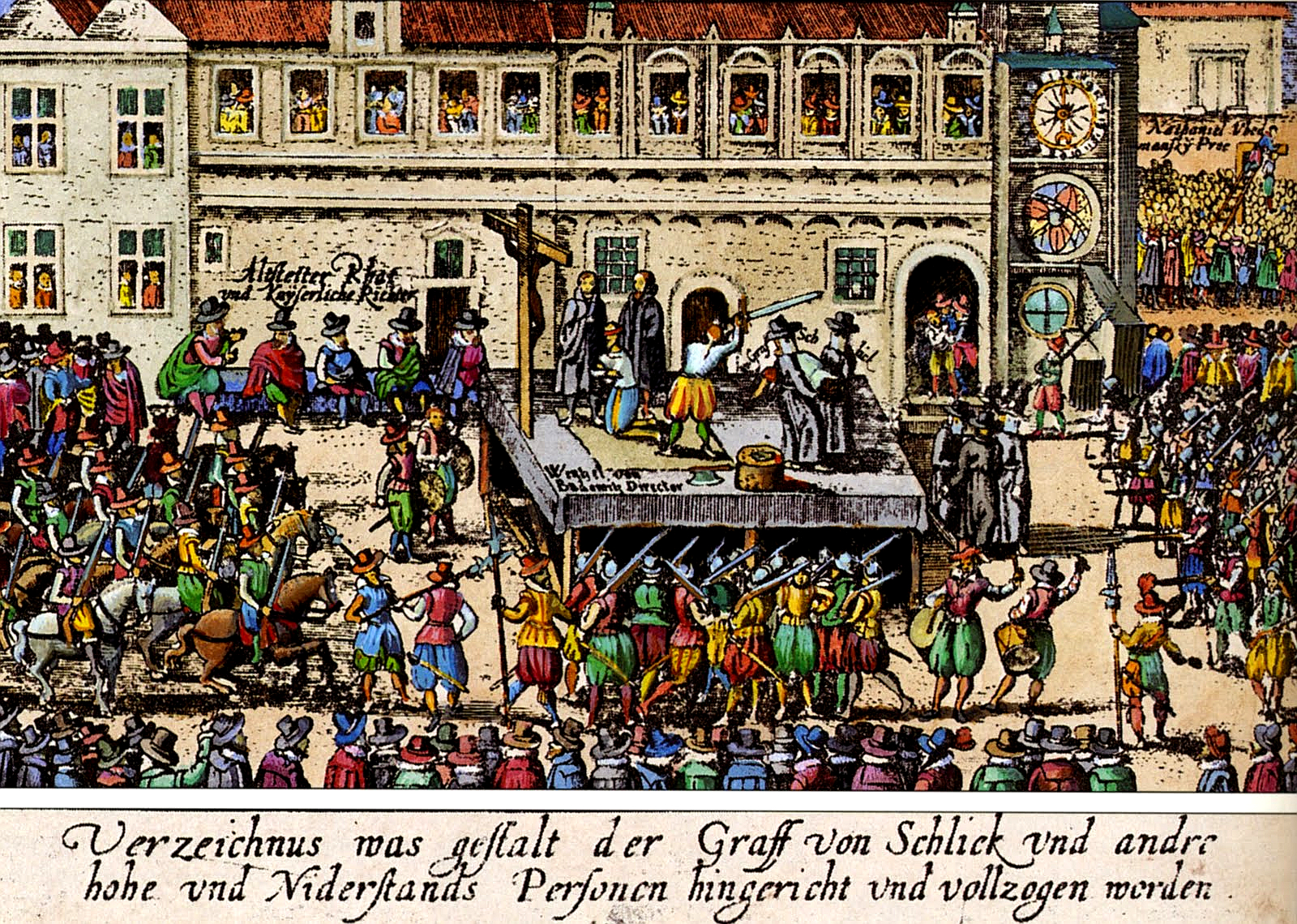
Execution of the 27 burghers

Maxmilián Hošťálek of Javořice (1564 – 21 June 1621 in Prague) was a burgher, mayor of Žatec, beheaded for his role during the Bohemian Revolt (1618–1620) in the Thirty Years' War.

== Life ==
Hošťálek was one of the Protestant councilmen of Žatec opposed to the election of Ferdinand II, Holy Roman Emperor. In May 1618 he was elected as one of the ten members of the council of the Burghers. In the aftermath of the Battle of White Mountain he was beheaded on 21 June 1621 along with 26 other Czech burghers and noblemen, including Jan Jesenius (1566–1621) rector magnificus of Charles University. His head was hung on the Prague gate in Žatec, and his estates were confiscated by the crown. His sons from his first marriage served in the armies of the anti-Habsburg coalition, and information about their lives or deaths is not known. John Sigismund, his son from his second marriage, later became a colonel of the imperial army. By an agreement reached in 1637 with Emperor Ferdinand III, he was allowed to remove his father's remains from the city gate and bury them.
