= Battle of White Mountain =

1620 battle of the Thirty Years' War

- Part of the Bohemian Revolt, and Thirty Years' War
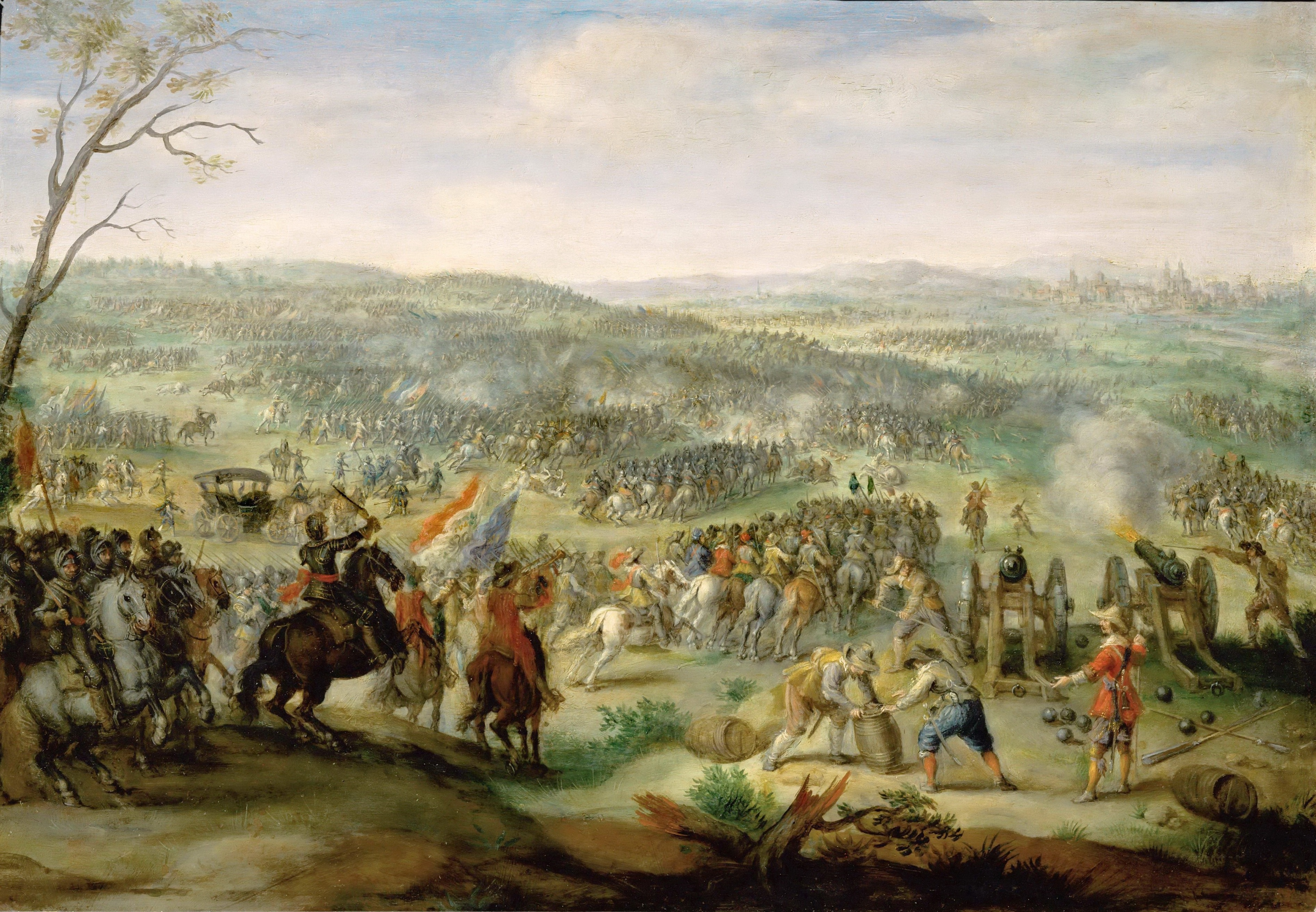
- Battle of White Mountain, oil painting by P. Snaijers
| Date | 8 November 1620 |
| Location | White Mountain, (Note: Czech: Bílá hora) near Prague, Kingdom of Bohemia (nowadays Czech Republic) |
| Result | Imperial victory |

Belligerents
| (Holy Roman Empire) Habsburg Monarchy; Catholic League (Spain) Spanish Empire | (Kingdom of Bohemia) Bohemian Confederation; Electoral Palatinate |

Commanders and leaders
| Johann Tserclaes (Holy Roman Empire) Charles Longueval (Spain) Guillermo Verdugo (Spain) Carlo Spinelli | Christian I Christian II (POW) (Kingdom of Bohemia) Jindřich Thurn (Bohemia) Georg Friedrich (Kingdom of Bohemia) Heinrich Schlick (surrendered) (Kingdom of Bohemia) Johann Ernst I |

Strength
| 23,000; 12 guns | 21,000; 10 guns |

Casualties and losses
| 650 killed or wounded | 2,800 killed or wounded |

The Battle of White Mountain (Note: Czech: Bitva na Bílé hoře; German: Schlacht am Weißen Berg) was fought on 8 November 1620 outside Prague in the early stages of the Thirty Years' War. An army backing Frederick V led by Christian of Anhalt was defeated by forces supporting his rival Ferdinand II, Holy Roman Emperor, under Bucquoy and Count Tilly.

Imperial forces entered Prague on 9 November and Frederick fled into Silesia.

== Prelude ==
In the early 17th century, most of the Bohemian estates, although under the dominion of the predominantly Catholic Holy Roman Empire, had large Protestant populations, and had been granted rights and protections allowing them varying degrees of religious and political freedom.

In 1617, as the health of Emperor Matthias deteriorated, his cousin Ferdinand – a devout Catholic and proponent of the Counter-Reformation – was named his successor as Holy Roman Emperor and King of Bohemia. This led to deep consternation among many Bohemian Protestants, who feared not only the loss of their properties, but also of their traditional semi-autonomy, under which many of the estates had separate, individual constitutions governing their relationship with the Empire, and where the king was elected by the local leaders.

Ferdinand (who would become Emperor Ferdinand II following Matthias's death in 1619) saw Protestantism as inimical to the Empire, and wanted to impose absolutist rule on Bohemia while encouraging conversion to the Catholic faith. He also hoped to reclaim church properties which had been seized by Protestants at the start of the Reformation decades earlier.

Particularly galling to Protestants were perceived violations of Emperor Rudolf II's 1609 Letter of Majesty, which had ensured religious freedom throughout Bohemia. In May 1618, wanting to air their grievances over this and other issues, a group of Bohemian noblemen met representatives of the Emperor at the royal castle in Prague; the meeting ended with two of the representatives and their scribe being thrown out a high window and seriously injured. This incident, known as the Third Defenestration of Prague, triggered the Bohemian Revolt.

In November 1619, Elector Palatine Frederick V, who like many of the rebels was a Calvinist, was chosen as King of Bohemia by the Bohemian Electorate.

== Battle ==
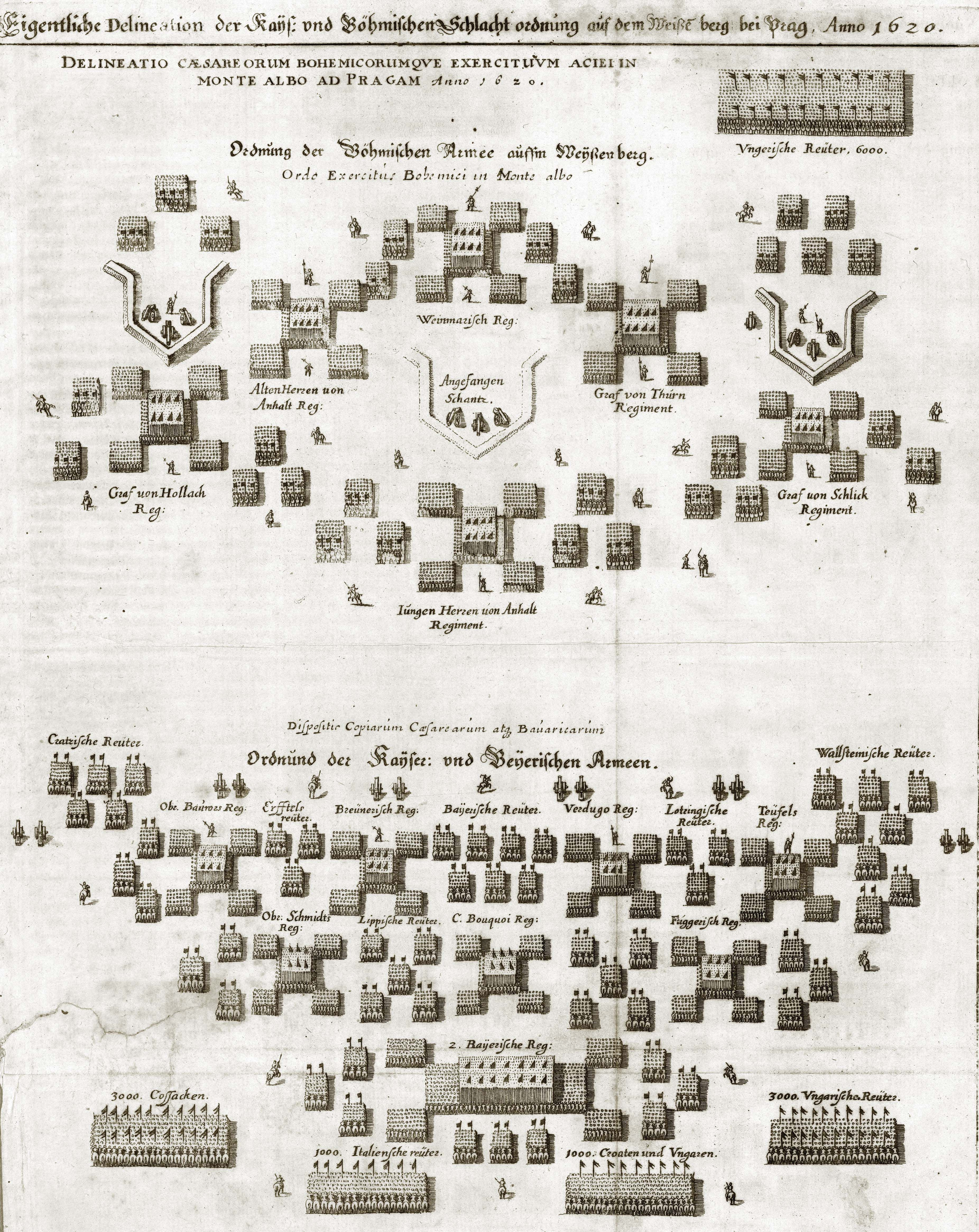
Plan of the battle from Theatrum Europaeum: Bohemians above, Imperial and Bavarian forces below

Battle of White Mountain (1620)

In 1620, now fully established as emperor, Ferdinand II set out to conquer Bohemia and make an example of the rebels. King Frederick and his military commander, Prince Christian of Anhalt, had organized a Protestant army of 30,000 men; Ferdinand countered with a force of 25,000, many of them seasoned soldiers, under the capable leadership of Field Marshal Tilly, a Catholic Spanish-Flemish nobleman. Tilly's army enjoyed the advantage of including two successful military leaders – Tilly himself and the future General Wallenstein. Tilly's force was made up of two distinct groups: Imperial troops commanded by Charles Bonaventure de Longueval, Count of Bucquoy, and soldiers of the German Catholic League, directly under Tilly. Spanish reinforcements under Guillermo Verdugo and Carlo Spinelli were also sent by Philip III from Naples, including mostly Italian and Walloon forces. All of the armies of the day employed numerous mercenaries, including, by some definitions, Tilly himself. Serving with the Catholic League as an official observer was the future "father of modern philosophy", René Descartes.

After conquering most of western Bohemia, the Imperial Army made for Prague, the Bohemian capital, then in rebel hands. The Bohemians attempted to block them by setting up defensive positions, which the Imperial army simply bypassed. Force-marching his men, Christian of Anhalt managed to get ahead of the Imperial army just before Prague. He thus gained an advantageous position on the "White Mountain", actually a low plateau, but had little time to set up defensive works. Enthusiasm for joining battle was low on both sides. After the reverses of the previous several weeks, Christian of Anhalt's army had been reduced to about 15,000 men, with little prospect of victory; the mercenaries on both sides had not been paid in months; and with winter approaching, cold wet weather made for less than ideal combat conditions.

The Bohemian left was commanded by Count Thurn while the center was commanded by Anhalt, the right commanded by Heinrich von Schlick and another force under Johann Ernst I, Duke of Saxe-Weimar. On 8 November a small Imperial force was sent to probe the Protestant flank. To their surprise, the Bohemians retreated at their advance. Tilly quickly sent in reinforcements, and the Bohemian flank began to crumble. Anhalt tried to relieve the situation by sending forward infantry and cavalry led by his son Christian II. The cavalry charged into the Imperial infantry, causing significant casualties and routing their regiments except by Verdugo and his Walloons. Tilly then countered with his own cavalry, forcing the Bohemian horsemen to retire.

Contemporary depiction of the Battle of White Mountain

The Bohemian infantry, who were only now approaching the Imperial army, saw the cavalry retreating, at which they fired one volley at extreme range before retreating themselves. A small group of Imperial cavalry began circling the Protestant forces, driving them to the middle of the battlefield. With the Bohemian army already demoralized, company after company began retreating, most without having actually entered the battle. Tilly and his Imperial cavalrymen advanced with 2,000 Bavarian hussars, steadily pushing Protestant forces back to the Star Palace (just west of Prague), where the rebels tried without success to establish a line of defense. The Protestant entrenchement was assailed by Spinelli and his Neapolitan infantry, who captured the Protestant artillery and shut it down.

Ultimately, the Bohemian army was no match for the Emperor Ferdinand's troops. The actual battle lasted only an hour and left the Bohemian army in tatters. Some 4,000 Protestants were killed or captured, while Imperial losses amounted to only about 700.

== Aftermath ==
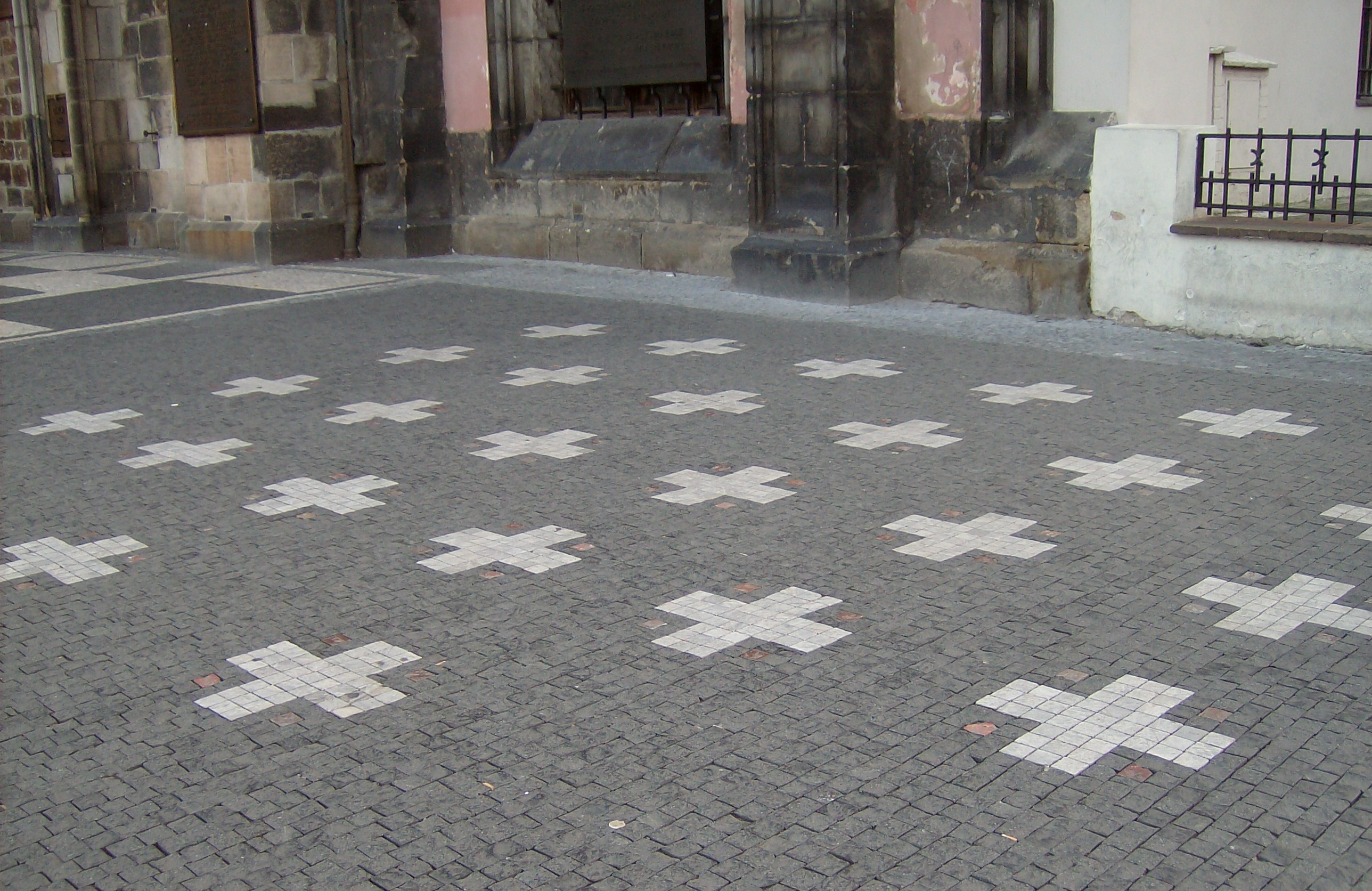
The 27 tributary crosses

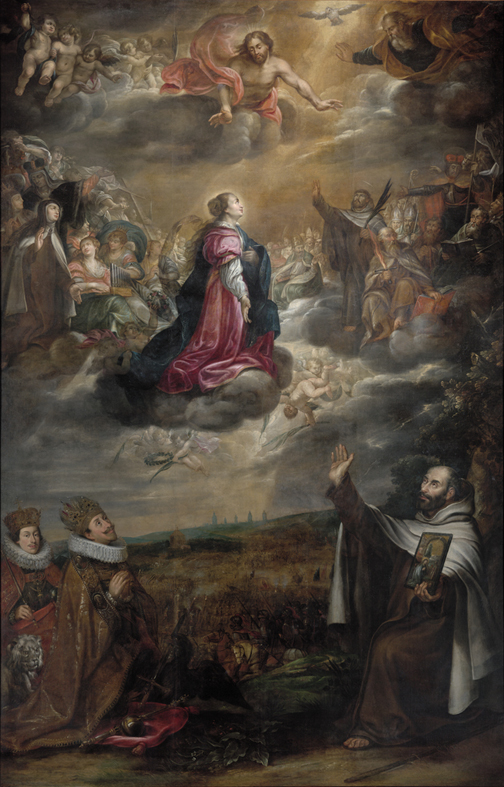
Painting celebrating the Catholic victory, by Anton Stevens (c. 1610–1675). In the upper part there is Our Lady of Victory surrounded by saints; in the lower left-hand corner there is the victorious Emperor Ferdinand II with his son Ferdinand III and the Bohemian lion.

With the Bohemian army destroyed, Tilly entered Prague and the revolt collapsed. King Frederick fled the country with his wife Elizabeth after only a year on the throne (gaining him the mocking nickname the Winter King). Forty-seven leaders of the insurrection were put on trial, and twenty-seven of them were executed in Prague's Old Town Square on what came to be called the "Old Town Square execution". Amongst those executed were Kryštof Harant and Jan Jesenius. Today, 27 crosses have been laid into the cobblestones as a tribute to those executed. An estimated five-sixths of the Bohemian nobility went into exile soon after the Battle of White Mountain, and their properties were confiscated.

There remained a strong Protestant army in Silesia under the command of Johann Georg von Brandenburg, Duke of Krnov, which continued fighting the Imperial army in Moravia and in what today is Slovakia until 1623.

In 1621, the Emperor ordered all Calvinists and other non-Lutherans to leave the realm in three days or to convert to Catholicism. In 1622, he forbade practice of the Lutheran faith. In 1626, he ordered all Lutherans (most of whom had not been involved in the revolt) to convert or else leave the country. By 1627, Archbishop Harrach of Prague and Jaroslav Borzita of Martinice set out to convert the heretics, as they were termed, by peaceful means; most Bohemians converted, but a significant Protestant minority remained.

Spanish troops, seeking to encircle their rebellious Dutch provinces, seized the Palatinate lands. With the prospect of Protestantism being overrun in Germany, Denmark entered the struggle. Sweden was to join the Protestant forces in 1630.

The population in the Lands of the Bohemian Crown declined by about a third until the end of the war.

The result of the 1620 battle brought two centuries of recatholicization of the Czech lands and the decline of the Czech-speaking aristocracy and elite as well as the Czech language (accompanied with the growing influence of Catholic German-speaking elites led by the Austrian Habsburg aristocracy), a process that was slowed by the Czech National Revival starting in the late 18th century. Czech nationalist historians and writers such as Alois Jirásek have referred to the 17th and 18th century in the Czech lands as the Dark Age.

== See also ==
- Letohrádek Hvězda

== Sources ==
- The History of the Thirty Years' War by Friedrich Schiller
- Luca Cristini, 1618–1648 La guerra dei 30 anni. Volume 1, 1618–1632 (2007) (ISBN 978-88-903010-1-8)
- Luca Cristini, 1618–1648 La guerra dei 30 anni. Volume 2, 1632–1648 (2007) (ISBN 978-88-903010-2-5)
- Teich, Mikulas (ed.). Bohemia in history. Cambridge University Press (1998).
- Guthrie, William P. (2002). Battles of the Thirty Years' War: From White Mountain to Nordlingen, 1618–1635. Greenwood Press. ISBN 9780313320286.
- Helfferich, T. (2009). The Thirty Years' War: A Documentary History. Hackett Publishing. ISBN 9781603843638.
- Josef V. Polisensky. La guerra dei trent'anni: da un conflitto locale a una guerra europea nella prima metà del Seicento – Torino: Einaudi, 1982. Translated as Thirty Years' War, University of California Press (June 1971).
- Tomáš Kleisner, Giovanni Pietro de Pomis' Medal of the Battle of the White Mountain
- Vehse, Karl Eduard (1856). Memoirs of the Court, Aristocracy, and Diplomacy of Austria. pp. 313–316.
- Wilson, Peter H. (2009). Europe's Tragedy: A History of the Thirty Years' War. Allen Lane. ISBN 978-0-7139-9592-3.
