= Ondřej Hošťálek =

Czech ice hockey player

- Born: 21 July 1991 (age 34)
- Height: 6 ft 0 in (183 cm)
- Weight: 190 lb (86 kg; 13 st 8 lb)
- Position: Forward
- Shoots: Left
- Czech Extraliga team: HC Plzeň
- Playing career: 2010–present

Ondřej Hošťálek (born 21 July 1991) is a Czech professional ice hockey player. He played with HC Plzeň in the Czech Extraliga during the 2010–11 season.
