= Heinrich von Schlick =

Heinrich von Schlick zu Bassano und Weißkirchen
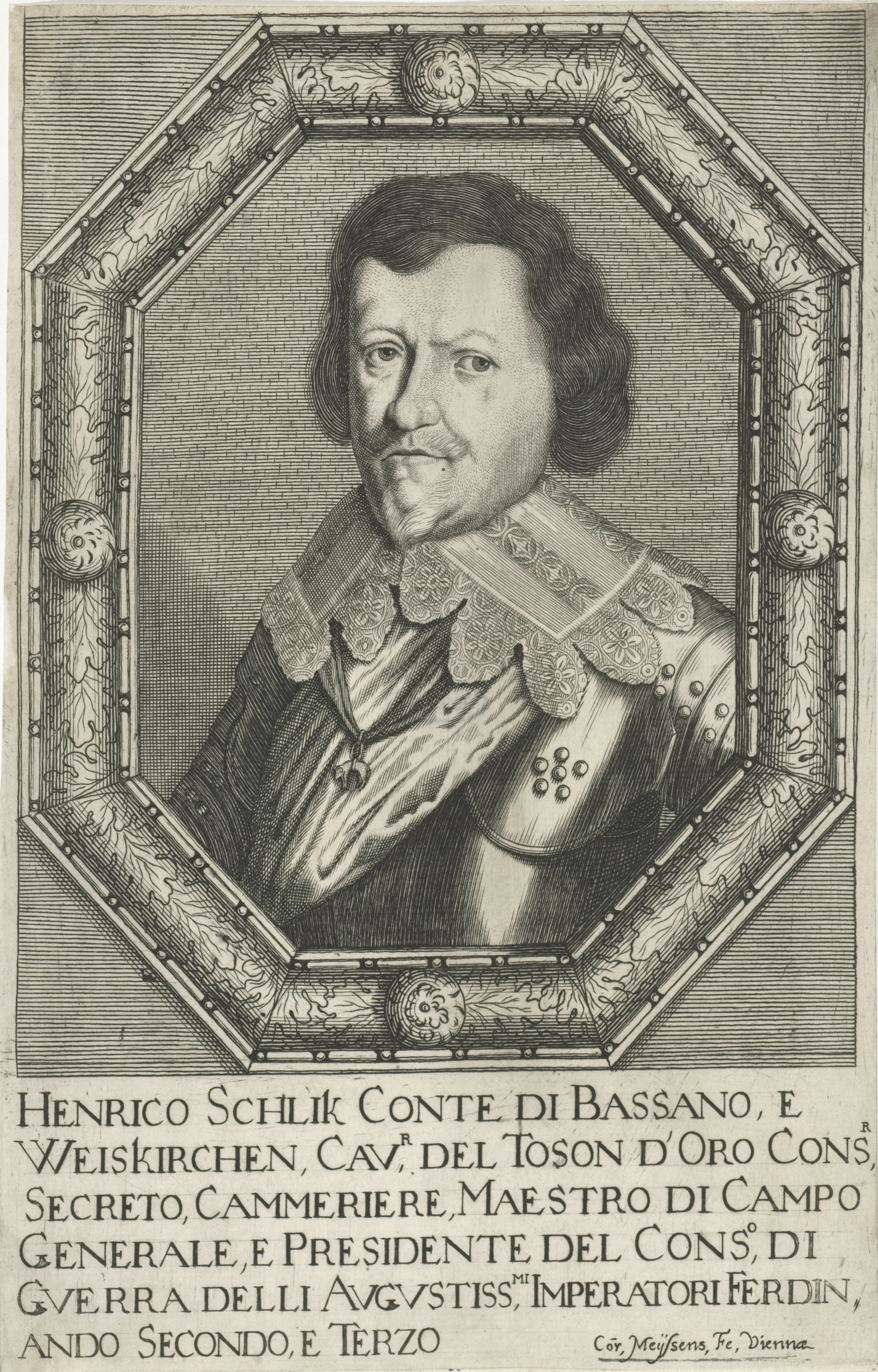
- Portrait of Heinrich von Schlick by Cornelis Meyssens
- Military career
- Rank: Field Marshal
- Conflicts: Thirty Years' War

Count Heinrich von Schlick zu Bassano und Weißkirchen (1580 – 5 January 1650, Vienna) was an Imperial Field Marshal and president of the Hofkriegsrat.

As a young man, he fought in Hungary under Giorgio Basta for Rudolf II against Stephen Bocskay's revolt until 1604. Also served in the Spanish Army in Flanders, Julich and Milan.

As a Lutheran, he sided with the Protestant Bohemians at the beginning of the Bohemian phase of the Thirty Years War, when the province was overrun by Imperial forces. As a competent officer his advice was often overlooked, especially at the Battle of White Mountain that took place on November 8, 1620. The battle was a defeat for the Protestant Bohemians by Imperial forces. After the defeat he changed to the Imperial side and became a member of the Imperial War Council.

Von Schlick continued fighting for the Imperial forces under Johann Tserclaes, Count of Tilly, during the Danish Phase of the Thirty Years War 1626–1628. Von Schlick was at the Battle of Lutter fought on August 26–27, 1626. Von Schlick was also in command of an Infantry Regiment Schlick, composed of Bohemians.

He ended his military career in 1630. At the request of the Emperor, he became president of the Hofkriegsrat in 1632, a post he would hold until 1649. He was one of the most important adversaries of Albrecht von Wallenstein. He returned a last time to the battlefield when Swedish general Königsmarck attacked Prague in July 1648. He died 18 months later.

In 1644, he had become a Knight in the Order of the Golden Fleece.

Heinrich von Schlick converted in 1622 to the Catholic faith and married on 21 February 1623 with Anna Maria von Salm-Neuburg (1598–1647), with whom he had 2 children: Franz Ernst and Maria Sidonia.
