= Karl Eduard Vehse =

German historian and archivist (1802–1870)

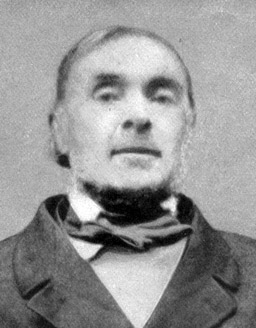
- Vehse ca. 1860
- Born: 18 December 1802; Freiberg
- Died: 18 June 1870 (aged 67); Striesen
- Occupation: Historian
- Known for: Writings about German courts

Karl Eduard Vehse (18 December 1802 – 18 June 1870) was a German historian and archivist.

== Biography ==
Karl Eduard Vehse was born on 18 December 1802 in Freiberg near Dresden. He studied at the Freiberg University of Mining and Technology before studying law and history in Leipzig and Göttingen from 1820 to 1824. He finished his studies in 1925 earning a doctorate.

From 1825 to 1839 he was archivist at the public record office in Dresden, which in the early 19th century was one of the largest collections of source material in Germany.

From 1849 he worked as a historian in Berlin, where he began writing about the history of German courts. His work titled Geschichte der deutschen Höfe seit der Reformation was published in 48 volumes between 1851 and 1858. Heinrich Heine considered himself an avid reader of Vehse's volumes.

Politically a liberal democrat, Vehse faced political persecution. He was imprisoned for six months for libel against Duke William of Mecklenburg-Schwerin.

He died on 18 June 1870 in Striesen, today a district of Dresden.
