= Old Town Square execution =

1621 public execution of leaders of the Bohemian Revolt in Prague

Coordinates: 50.0872°N 14.4209°E

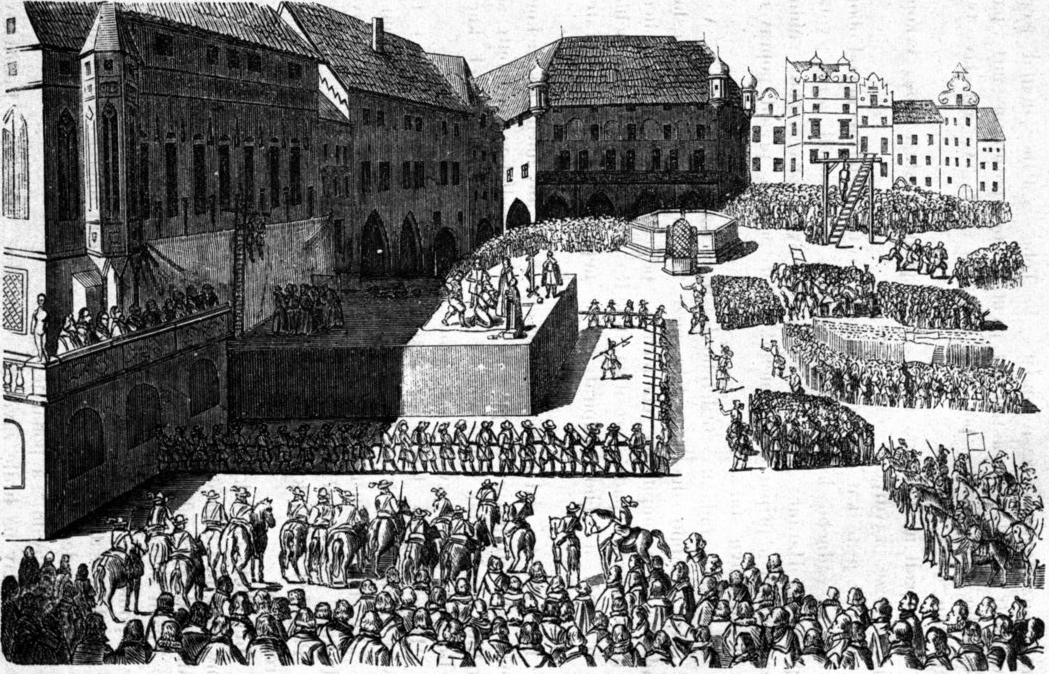
19th century drawing by older woodcut, depicting the execution

Old Town Square execution (Czech: Staroměstská exekuce) was the execution of 27 Bohemian leaders (three noblemen, seven knights and 17 burghers) of the Bohemian Revolt by the Austrian House of Habsburg that took place on 21 June 1621 at the Old Town Square in Prague.

After the Prague Defenestration in 1618 and subsequent Protestant uprising of the Bohemian estates against the Catholic Habsburgs resulted in the Thirty Years' War and a final defeat in the Battle of White Mountain, the Habsburgs took their revenge and executed some of the key leaders of the uprising, although with some others the punishment was reduced and some were pardoned.

== Execution ==
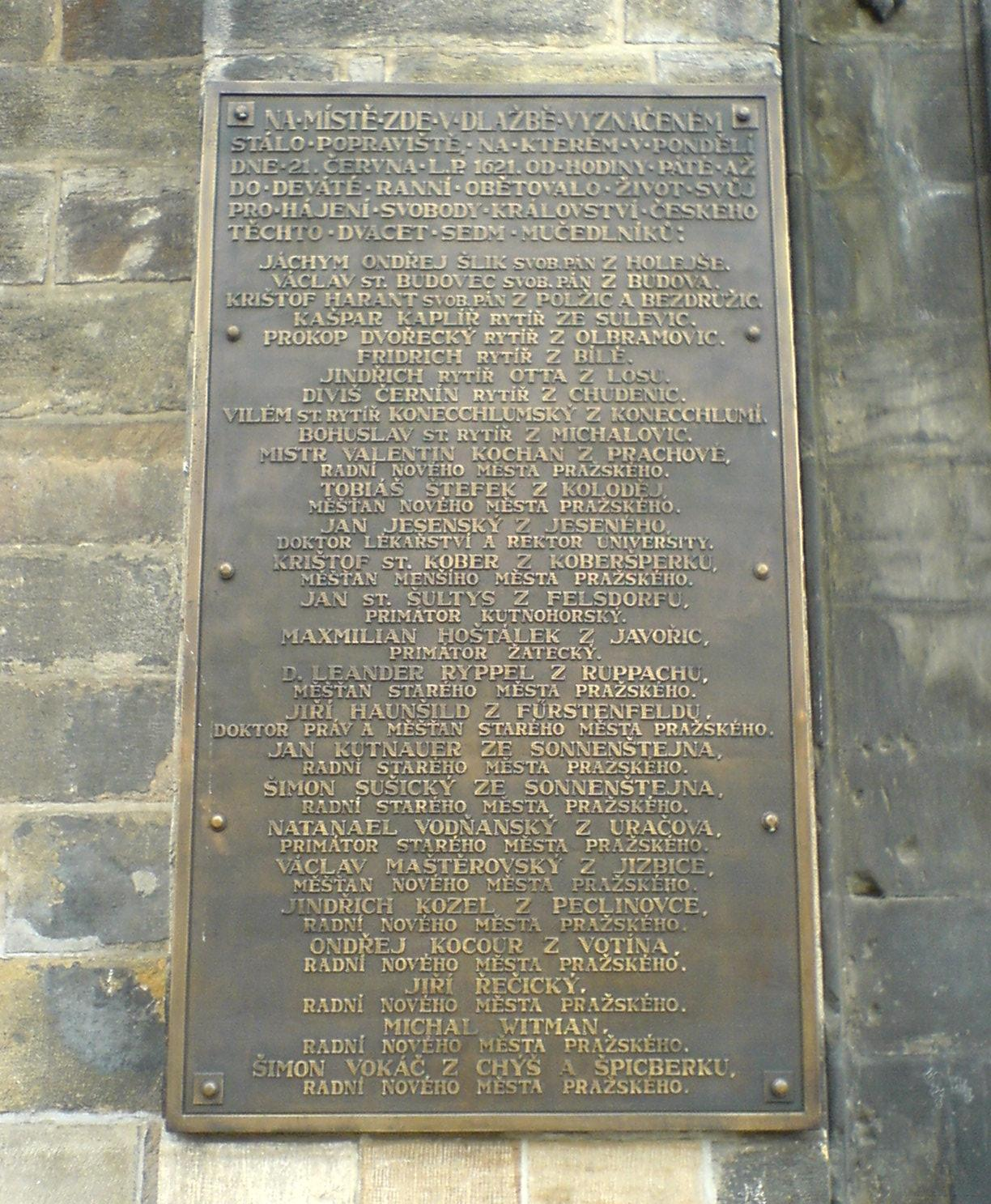
Memorial plaque with names of those executed at the Old Town Hall

The execution of the 27 leaders of the Bohemian Estates Uprising began on 21 June 1621 in Prague on the Old Town Square. The executioner was an utraquist, so they could pray before the execution.

Joachim Andreas von Schlick was beheaded first. This was followed by the execution of Jan Jesenius, whose tongue was cut out first, then he was beheaded. His body was quartered and the parts impaled on stakes. Jan Jesenius was punished most severely for several reasons: firstly, he persuaded Hungary to break with the emperor and secondly, he wrote a political-philosophical treatise Pro vindiciis contra tyrannos (en: Can a tyrant be overthrown by people?). Others were beheaded by the sword; some of them had their right hands cut off first. The members of the Unity of the Brethren were hanged, which was the most disgraceful death for them.

Headless bodies were handed over to the families, who buried them. Twelve heads were put into iron baskets and attached by the executioner to the Old Town Bridge Tower. The heads hung there until the invasion of the Saxon army took place here in 1631.

City clerk Mikuláš Diviš was nailed to the gallows by the tongue for one hour for welcoming Frederick V of the Palatinate on his arrival to Prague. Some nobles involved in the uprising escaped into exile, such as Jindřich Matyáš Thurn. Martin Fruwein z Podolí (cs, de) was also expected to be executed, but he committed suicide by jumping from the White Tower of Prague Castle.

== List of the executed ==
=== Nobles ===
1. Joachim Andreas von Schlick
2. Václav Budovec of Budov (Václav Budovec z Budova, Václav Budovec z Budova)
3. Kryštof Harant of Polžice and Bezdružice

=== Knights ===
1. Kašpar Kaplíř of Sulevice (Kašpar Kaplíř ze Sulevic, Kaspar Cappleri de Sulewicz)
2. Prokop Dvořecký of Olbramovice (Prokop Dvořecký z Olbramovic)
3. Fridrich of Bílá (Fridrich z Bílé, Friedrich von Bila)
4. Jindřich Otta of Los (Jindřich Otta z Losu)
5. Diviš Černín of Chudenice (Diviš Černín z Chudenic, Diwisch Czernin von Chudenitz)
6. Vilém Konecchlumský of Konecchlumí (Vilém Konecchlumský z Konecchlumí)
7. Bohuslav of Michalovice (Bohuslav z Michalovic)

=== Burghers ===
1. Valentin Kochan of Prachová (Valentin Kochan z Prachové)
2. Tobiáš Štefek of Koloděje (Tobiáš Štefek z Koloděj)
3. Jan Jesenius
4. Kryštof Kobr of Koberštejn (Kryštof Kobr z Koberštejna)
5. Jan Šultys of Felsdorf (Jan Šultys z Felsdorfu)
6. Maxmilián Hošťálek of Javořice
7. Jan Kutnauer of Sonnenštejn (Jan Kutnauer ze Sonnenštejna)
8. Simeon Sušický of Sonnenštejn (Simeon Sušický ze Sonnenštejna)
9. Nathanaél Vodňanský of Uračov (Nathanaél Vodňanský z Uračova)
10. Václav Maštěrovský of Jizbice (Václav Maštěrovský z Jizbice)
11. Jindřich Kozel of Peclinovec (Jindřich Kozel z Peclinovce)
12. Ondřej Kocour of Votín (Ondřej Kocour z Votína)
13. Jiří Řečický (Jiří Řečický)
14. Michal Witmann (Michal Witmann)
15. Simeon Vokáč of Chyše (Simeon Vokáč z Chýš)
16. Leander Rüppel of Ruppach (Leander Rüppel z Ruppachu)
17. Jiří Hauenšild of Fürstenfeld (Jiří Hauenšild z Fürstenfeldu)

== Consequences ==
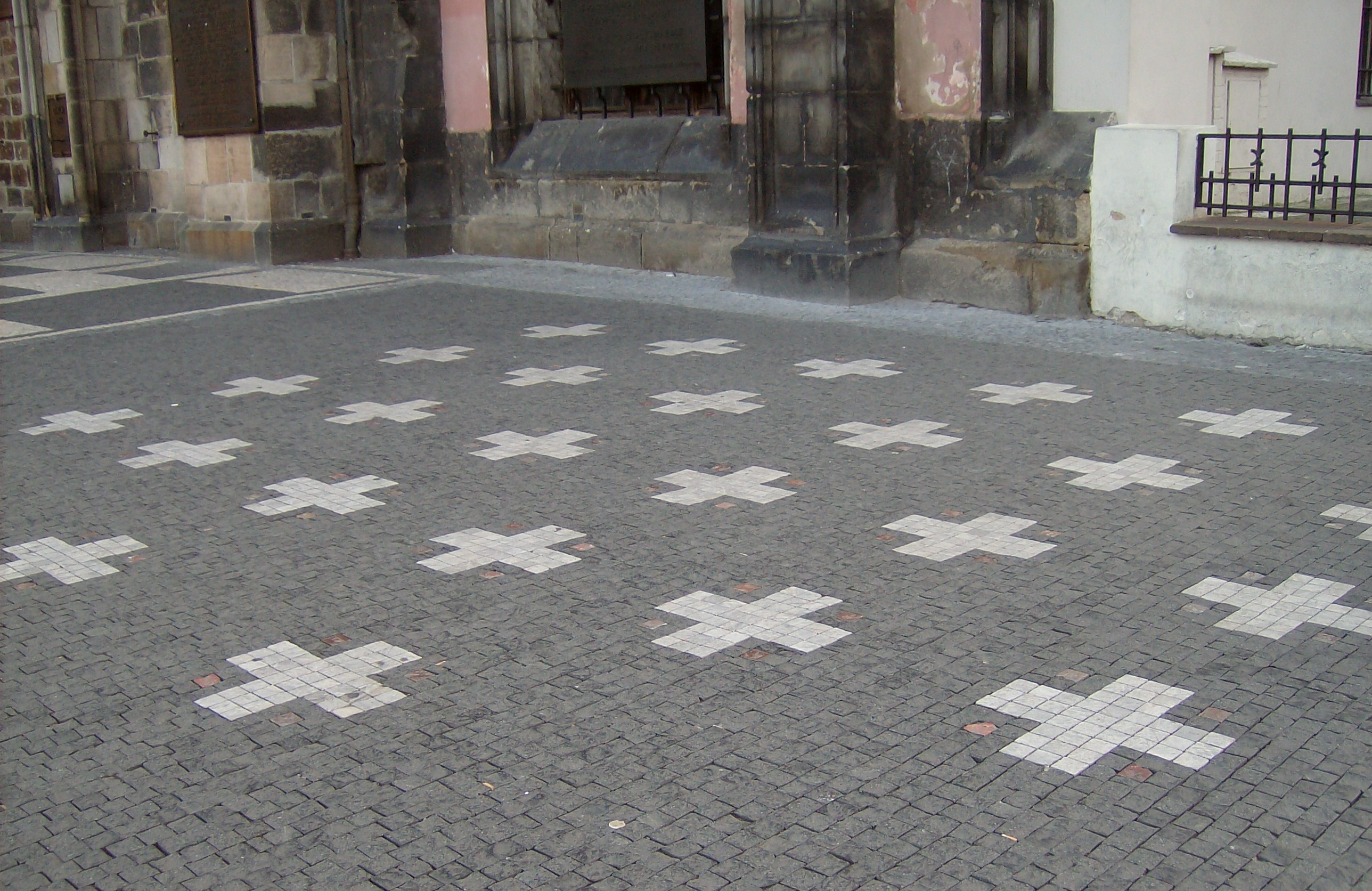
27 tributary crosses in the place of execution at the Old Town Square

Execution was only one of the consequences of the Bohemian Revolt, which failed. Other consequences were the possession of the Bohemian royal crown in the hands of the Habsburgs (now hereditary), which meant another nearly 300 years of their domination. Another major consequence was the subsequent re-Catholization, and since 75-90% of Bohemians were Protestant, it meant a great emigrant wave (which was the majority of Bohemian intelligentsia). The German language was made fully equal to the Czech language, so Germanization of the entire population (not only the nobility) was also carried out.

The executioner's sword, on whose blade the names of eleven executed are engraved, is in the collections of Hus House (Husův dům) in Prague. However, it is likely that it is a fake sword, as in the list on the blade is engraved the name of Jan Kutnauer, who was actually hanged.

At that time there was a struggle for balance in Europe, Europe was divided into Catholic and Protestant, absolutist and estates monarchy. The uprising itself triggered a conflict to which the powers were already heading. Execution in the Old Town Square celebrated for the Spanish-Catholic party the triumph of victory.

== Sources ==
- Josef Svátek: Paměti katovské rodiny Mydlářů - rozličné příběhy katovské Volume 2, Publisher: XYZ, Prague 2005, ISBN 80-86864-25-1 (in Czech)
