= Jan Jesenius =

Bohemian physician, politician and philosopher

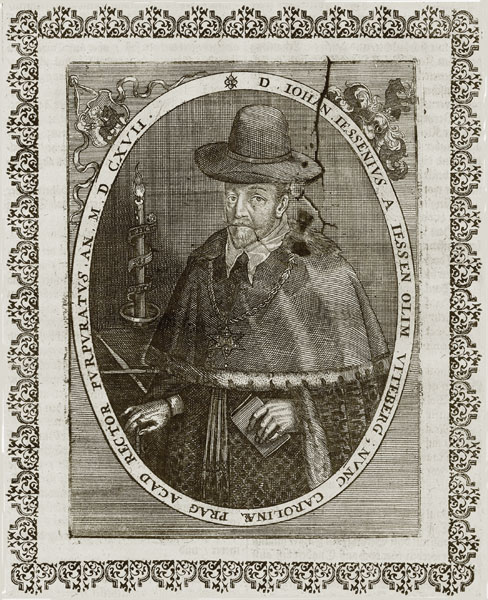
- D(ominus) Iohan(nes) Iessenius a Iessen olim Vitenberg, nunc Carolinae Prag(ae) Acad(emiae) rector purpuratus. A contemporary copperplate by Matthäus Merian, 1617
- Born: 27 December 1566; Breslau, Bohemia
- Died: 21 June 1621 (aged 54); Prague, Bohemia
- Known for: physician, politician, philosopher
- Scientific career
- Doctoral advisor: Hieronymus Fabricius
- Doctoral students: Daniel Sennert

Jan Jesenius, also written as Jessenius (German: Johannes Jessenius, Hungarian: Jeszenszky János, Slovak: Ján Jesenský; 27 December 1566 – 21 June 1621), was a Bohemian physician, anatomist, politician and philosopher. He was active in Prague, where he gained fame after he conducted a public dissection of a human body for scientific purposes. He was publicly executed following the Battle of White Mountain.

== Life ==
=== Early years ===
Jesenius was from an old noble family, the Jeszenszky family, originally from the Kingdom of Hungary. His father Boldizsár (Baltazar) Jeszenszky de Nagyjeszen was from Turóc County (today the Turiec region in Slovakia) and had settled in Breslau (today Wrocław, Poland) around 1555 following the Ottoman campaign in Upper Hungary. He worked as a diplomat and was married to Martha Schiller who was of German origin. He presented himself in his own works as eques Ungarus ("Hungarian knight"). Authors have variously noted that he had Slovak, Polish or German roots.

Jan Jesenius was born in Breslau in Bohemia, where he studied at the Elisabeth gymnasium. From 1583, he studied philosophy and medicine at the University of Wittenberg, from 1585 at the University of Leipzig, where he conducted vivisection of a cat under the anatomist Georg Walther. He received a bachelors degree with a dissertation titled De animae humanae immortalitate (On the Immortality of the Human Soul) in 1587. From 1588 he was at the University of Padua where he was taught by Girolamo Fabrizio. In 1591 he defended his medical thesis De Putrescentis Bilis in Febre Tertiana Exquisita Intermittente Loco (On the role of Putrifying Bile in Acquired Malaria Tertiana) and another in philosophy Pro vindiciis contra tyrannos (For the Defence Against Tyrants). As a protestant he was not eligible for the degree by the Catholic university of Padua but recommendations from his professors allowed him to obtain one. He returned to Breslau where he worked as a physician.

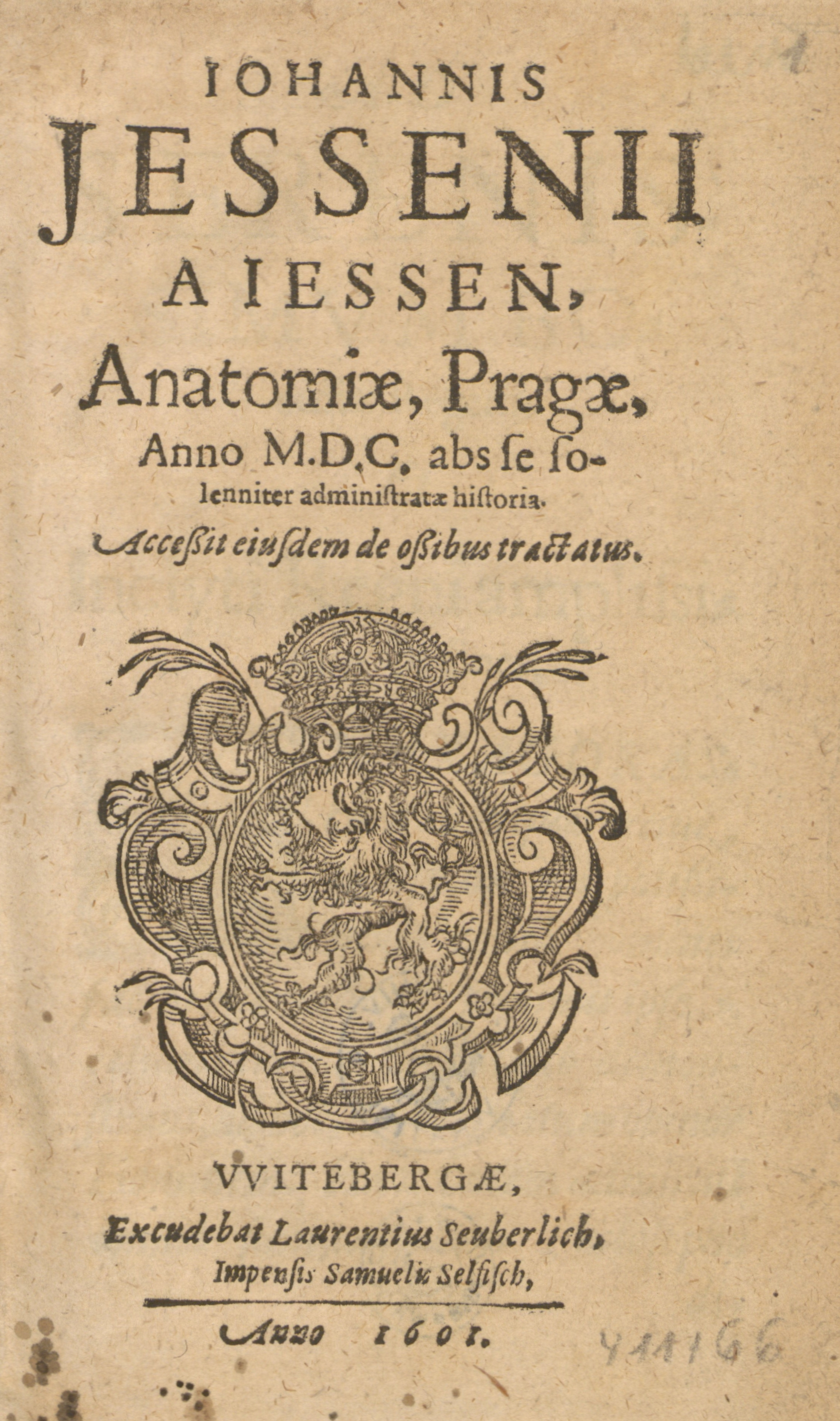
Title page of Anatomiae, Pragae (1601) with the Jessenius coat of arms

He married Maria Fels, daughter of the Imperial Registrar of the Silesian Chamber, Adamus Fels Sr, in 1595. She died in 1612 in Sopron, Hungary.

=== Professional achievements ===
Jesenius was made court physician in Dresden in 1593. His most important philosophical work was Zoroaster (1593), a work of universal philosophy which attempted to recover the lost wisdom of the ancients. This work was dedicated to duke Friedrich Wilhelm von Sachsen-Weimar. In 1594, he became professor of anatomy at the University of Wittenberg. In 1597, he was dean of medical faculty. Tycho Brahe visited him in 1598–1599 and invited him to Prague. After 1600, he settled down in Prague as professor and anatomical consultant for Emperor Rudolf II.

In 1600 he attracted considerable public interest by performing a public autopsy in Prague at the Reček College. A male cadaver of an executed man was used. This resulted in Anatomiae Pragae (1601). In this 160 page work he described the organs of the human body including a clear description of the larynx. His notes on the autopsy were republished in 2005 by Karolinum, a publishing house of Charles University of Prague. In 1601 he was among the first to consider the idea of skin diseases and their origins in his De cute, et cutaneis affectibus. During the 1606 plague he wrote De cavenda peste (On Evading the Plague) and in 1608 he wrote De sanguine, vena secta dimisso, iudicium (Treatise on Blood and Blood-Letting).

In 1617, he was elected rector of Charles University in Prague. He was forced to resign the position in 1620.

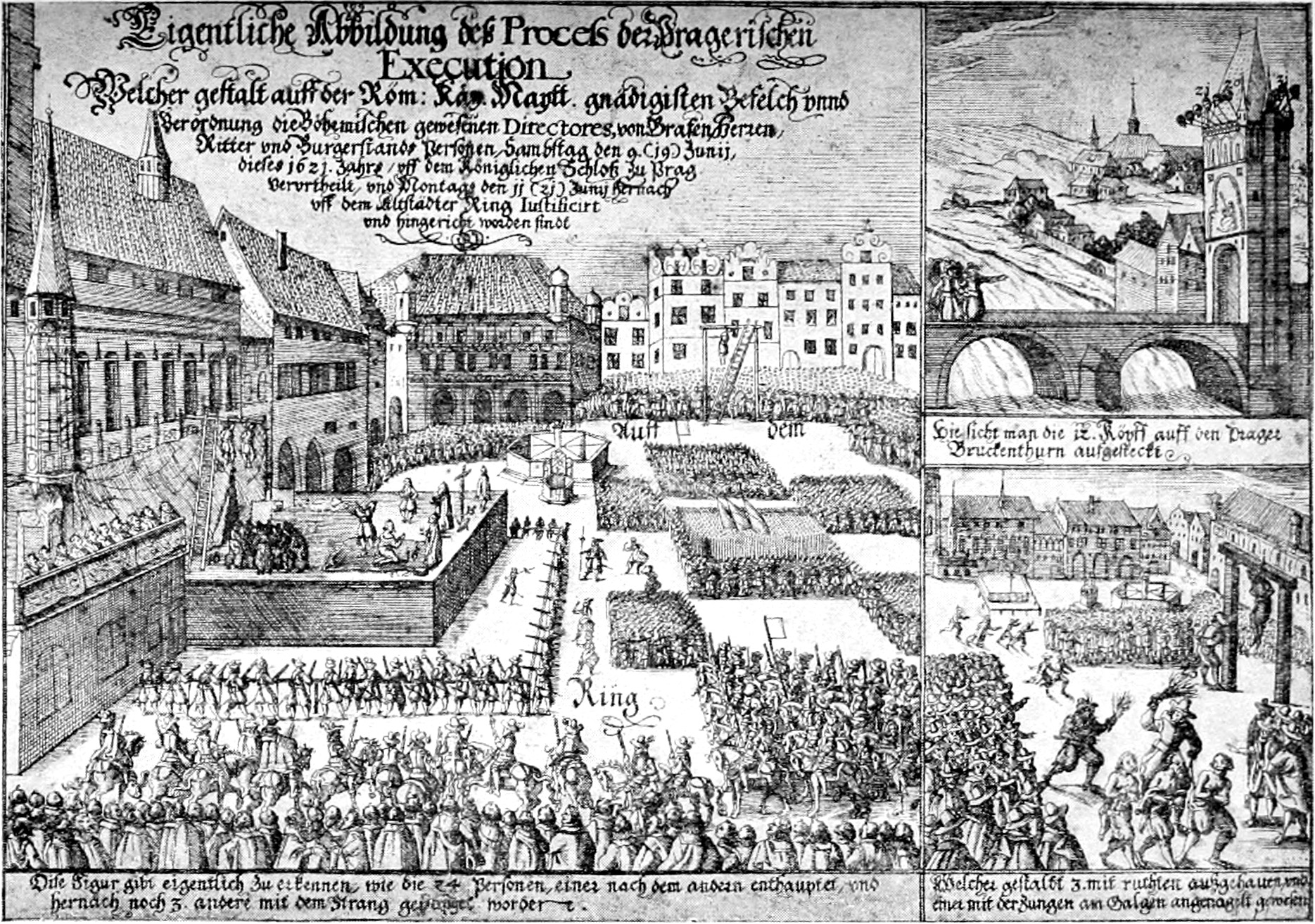
The scene of the execution in Prague

=== Political career ===
Jesenius was also a diplomat and orator, and after the dethroning of Habsburgs in the Crown of Bohemia, he took several diplomatic missions for Bohemian estates and for the newly elected king Frederick of the Palatinate. After three years much of which was associated with religious conflict between the Catholics and Protestants (Bohemian Revolt) he returned in 1612 to Prague and became rector at the university. Jesenius was mostly on the Czech protestant side and allied with the rebels to prevent Ferdinand II from becoming king of Hungary.

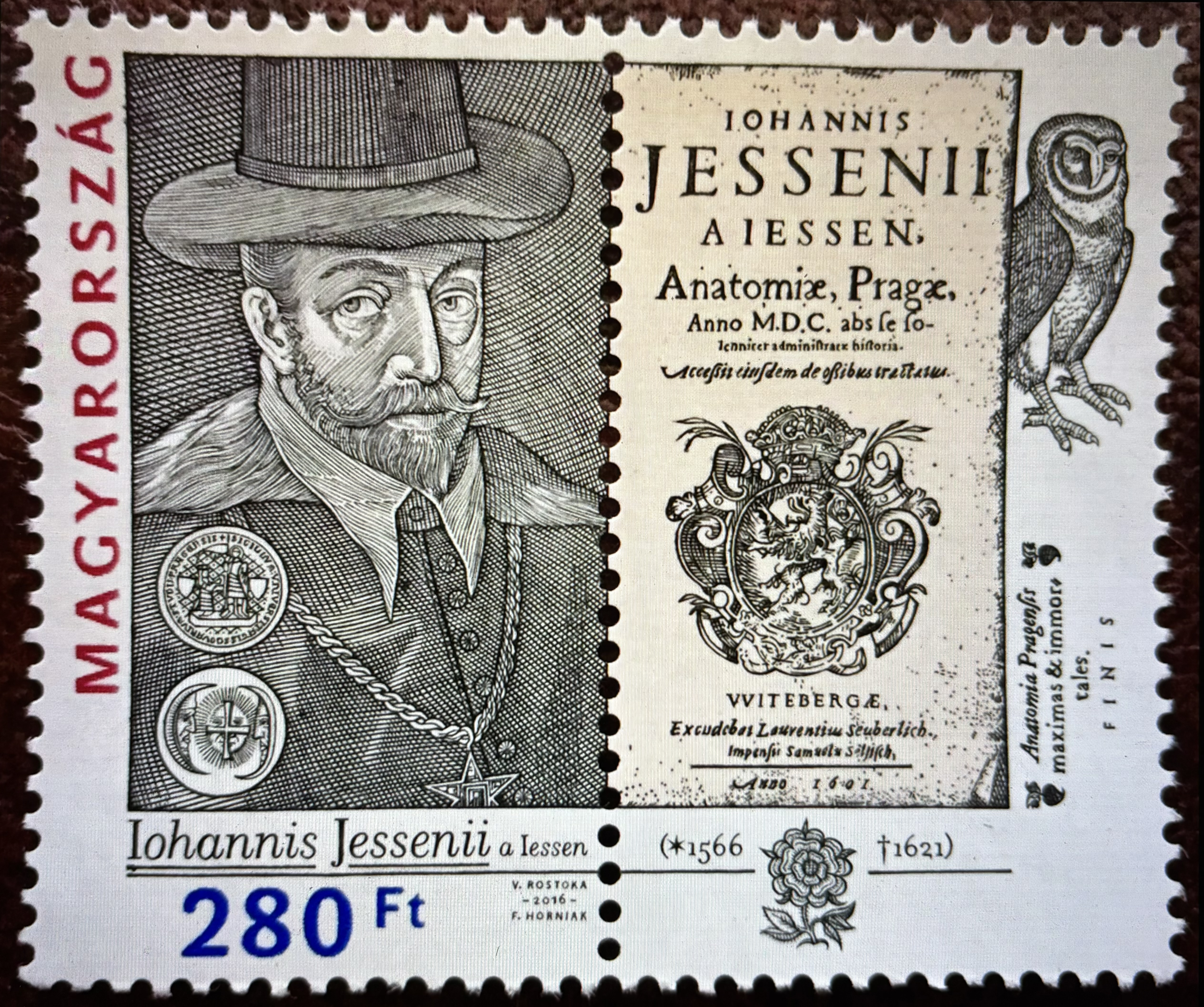
Hungary stamp #5874 commemorating Jan Jesenius

In 1618, Jesenius was arrested in Pressburg (Bratislava) after being sent as a deputy by the Bohemian estates, and was held in a prison of Vienna. In December, he was released in exchange for two Habsburg captives. There is a legend that, before his release, he wrote the inscription IMMMM on the wall of his prison cell. Ferdinand interpreted this as Imperator Mathias Mense Martio Morietur (Latin for "Emperor Mathias will die in the month of March"), and he wrote another prophecy next to it: Iesseni, Mentiris, Mala Morte Morieris ("Jesenius, you lie, you will die a horrible death").

Emperor Mathias died in March 1619, and Jesenius was arrested after the defeat of King Frederick of Bohemia by Emperor Ferdinand II in 1620 (Battle of White Mountain) and executed, along with 26 other Bohemian estates leaders, on the Old Town Square in 1621. The committee that interrogated him came to the verdict "ex gratia imperalia his tongue will be cut out alive, then he will be beheaded and quadrisected and hung at a crossroads close to the scaffold; his head with his tongue will be placed at the bridge" and after the execution his head was displayed on the Old Tower bridge along with eleven others.

== Legacy ==
Jesenius was honored during the 450th anniversary of his birth (2016) by a postage stamp jointly issued by Hungary, Czech Republic, Poland, & Slovakia.

== Other sources ==
- Ľudo Zúbek: Doktor Jesenius, Szlovákiai Szépirodalmi Könyvkiadó-Móra Ferenc Könyvkiadó, Bratislava(Pozsony)-Budapest, 1958. (in Hungarian)
- Ľudo Zúbek: Doktor Jesenius, Móra Ferenc Könyvkiadó, Budapest, 1966. (in Hungarian)
- Ruttkay László: Jeszenszky (Jessenius) János és kora 1566–1621, Semmelweis Orvostörténeti Múzeum és Könyvtár, Budapest, 1971. (in Hungarian)
- Philippe Malgouyres, La Science de l'émerveillement. Artistes et intellectuels à la cour de Rodolphe II (1552-1612), Paris, Mare & Martin, 2025, 978-2-36222-125-5 (in French)
