= 1570s =

Decade

The 1570s decade ran from January 1, 1570, to December 31, 1579.

Abraham Ortelius publishes the first modern atlas in 1570.

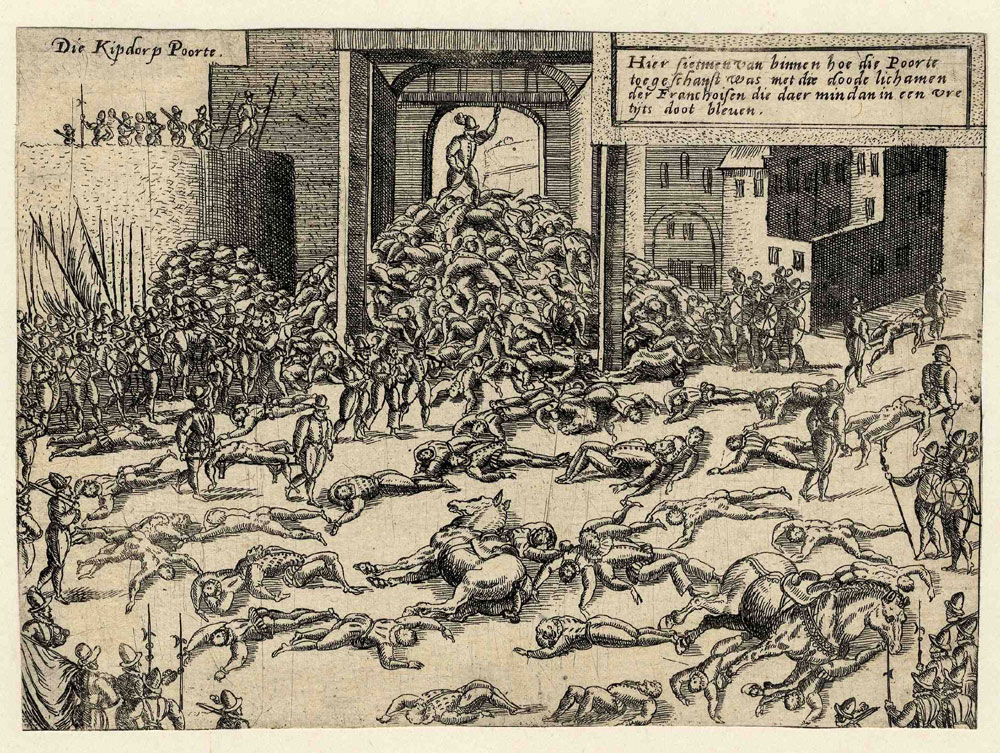
November 4, 1576: Sack of Antwerp

== Events ==
=== 1570 ===
==== January–March ====
- January 8 – Ivan the Terrible begins the Massacre of Novgorod.
- January 23 – The assassination of Scottish regent James Stewart, 1st Earl of Moray, by James Hamilton, the first known shooting of a national leader, throws Scotland into civil war. Having loaded a carbine rifle and carried it into the Linlithgow home of his uncle, the Archbishop of St Andrews, Hamilton stands at an upstairs window overlooking the street where Moray will ride by on horseback as part of cavalcade. Once Moray comes into range, Hamilton fires and fatally wounds the regent for King James VI.
- February 8 – An estimated 8.3 magnitude earthquake occurs in Concepción, Chile.
- February 5 – Venus occults Jupiter; this will next happen in 1818.
- March 28 – The ambassador of the Ottoman Sultan Selim II goes before the governing Council of the Venetian Republic and requests that Venice surrender the island of Cyprus. The Council rejects the demand and prepares to go to war with the Ottoman Empire.

==== April–June ====
- April 7 – In Scotland, Colin Campbell of Glenorchy receives permission from the Regent, the Earl of Morton, to execute the chief of Clan Gregor, his son-in-law Gregor Roy MacGregor, and carries out MacGregor's beheading at Balloch in front of the Earl of Atholl.
- April 27 – Pope Pius V excommunicates Queen Elizabeth I of England, and all persons who show allegiance to her, with the bull Regnans in Excelsis.
- May 20 – Abraham Ortelius publishes the first modern atlas, Theatrum Orbis Terrarum, in Antwerp.
- May 24 – Battle of Manila: The Spanish, led by Martín de Goiti, defeat the forces of Raja Sulayman.
- June 10 – The Kingdom of Livonia is established.

==== July–September ====
- July 3 – The Ottoman conquest of Cyprus begins as more than 350 Ottoman ships and over 60,000 troops land near Larnaca and then march toward the Cypriot capital, Nicosia.
- July 14 – Pope Pius V issues Quo primum, promulgating the 1570 edition of the Roman Missal.
- July 22
  - Thomson Snell & Passmore is founded, the oldest law firm in operation.
  - The siege of Nicosia by the Ottoman Empire begins in Cyprus and lasts for seven weeks.
- July 30 – (28th day of 6th month of Genki 1 Battle of Anegawa: The allied forces of Oda Nobunaga and Tokugawa Ieyasu defeat the combined forces of the Azai and Asakura clans.
- August 8 – The Peace of Saint-Germain ends the Third War of Religion in France. Again, the Huguenots are promised religious freedom and political autonomy.
- August 16 – The Treaty of Speyer is signed between John Sigismund Zápolya, Prince of Transylvania and Maximilian II, King of Hungary.
- September 9 – Nicosia falls to the Turks under the command of General Lala Mustafa Pasha. After the Ottomans breach the walls, the Venetian defenders are massacred and the women and boys are sold into slavery.
- September 10 – A party of ten Spanish Jesuit missionaries land on the Virginia Peninsula of North America to establish the Ajacán Mission, which will be massacred in February 1571.
- September 25 (26th day of 8th month of Genki 1 – The 10-year-long Ishiyama Hongan-ji War begins in Japan as Oda Nobunaga stages simultaneous attacks on two fortresses (Ishiyama Hongan-ji and Nagashima) of the Ikkō-ikki faction near Osaka.

==== October–December ====
- October 3 – Princess Anna of Austria arrives in Spain to become the Queen Consort of Spain as the bride of her uncle King Philip of Spain, whom she had married by proxy on May 4. Having traveled through the Netherlands, she asks King Philip to spare the life of the rebel Floris of Montmorency, but the King arranges the strangulation of Floris on October 14.
- November 17 – A major earthquake strikes the Italian city of Ferrara at 3:00 in the morning local time, destroying 40 percent of the buildings in the city, but causing only 171 deaths. After the initial shocks, a sequence of aftershocks continue for four years, with over 2,000 in the period from November 1570 to February 1571.
- December 13 – The Treaty of Stettin ends the Northern Seven Years' War.

==== Date unknown ====
- Spanish conquistador Juan de Salcedo (in the service of Miguel López de Legazpi) begins the conquest of the Kingdom of Maynila.
- Construction of the original Catedral Nuestra Señora de La Asunción, the oldest church in Venezuela, begins.
- The Whitechapel Bell Foundry is known to be in existence in London. By 2017, when it closes its premises in Whitechapel, it will be the oldest manufacturing company in Great Britain.
- Andrea Palladio publishes I quattro libri dell'architettura in Venice.
- Volcanic eruption in the Santorini caldera begins.
- The Andean population of the Viceroyalty of Peru reaches 1.3 million.

=== 1571 ===
==== January–March ====
- January 11 – The Austrian nobility are granted freedom of religion.
- January 23 – The Royal Exchange opens in London, England.
- February 4 – The Spanish Jesuit missionaries of the Ajacán Mission, established on the Virginia Peninsula of North America in 1570, are massacred by local Native Americans.
- March 18 – The Order of the Knights of Saint John transfers the capital of Malta, from Birgu to Valletta.

==== April–June ====
- April 2
  - The 3rd Parliament of Elizabeth I, with 438 members, assembles in England at Westminster after being summoned on February 17.
  - Dumbarton Castle is recaptured from Lord Fleming by the forces of Matthew Stewart, 4th Earl of Lennox, the Regent for King James VI of Scotland.
- April 12 – The Ridolfi plot to assassinate Queen Elizabeth I of England is foiled by the capture of Ridolfi's messenger, Charles Baillie.
- April 17 – Pope John XIV of Alexandria begins a 15-year reign as leader of the Coptic Christian Church.
- April 21
  - In China, General Altan Khan is granted authority to rule the western provinces by the Ming dynasty Emperor Longqing in return for his payment of a tribute.
  - In the German Duchy of Palatinate-Zweibrücken, the serfs are emancipated by John, Count of Palatine and Duke of Zweibrucken.
- May 24 – Moscow is burnt by the Crimean army, under Devlet I Giray.
- May 25 – The Holy League is established as an alliance of the Papal States, the Republic of Venice, the Republic of Genoa, the Grand Duchy of Tuscany, the Duchy of Savoy, the Duchy of Urbino, the Kingdom of Naples and Kingdom of Sicily(under the rule of the Spanish Empire and the Knights of Malta for mutual defense against attacks by the Ottoman Empire on ships in the Mediterranean Sea.
- May 29 – Queen Elizabeth I of England gives royal assent to laws that had been passed by the 3rd Parliament, including the Bulls from Rome Act 1571 to prevent the publication in England of papal bulls as well as "writings or instruments and other superstitious things from the See of Rome"
- June 3 – Following the Battle of Bangkusay Channel, the conquest of the Kingdom of Maynila is complete; Spanish Conquistador Miguel López de Legazpi makes Manila a city, and the capital of the Philippines.
- June 24 – On the island of Luzon in the Philippines, Miguel López de Legazpi of Spain establishes a Spanish fortress at Manila Bay and, after making a peace pact with the Crown Prince of Luzon, Rajah Sulayman declares Manila to be the administrative capital of the Spanish East Indies.
- June 25 – Queen Elizabeth's Grammar School, Horncastle, is founded in Lincolnshire, England.
- June 27 – Jesus College is established "within the City and University of Oxford of Queen Elizabeth's foundation" in England, by Welsh cleric and lawyer Hugh Price.

==== July–September ====
- July 14 – In what is now the state of Kerala in India, the Siege of Chaliyam begins as the Zamorin of Kozhikode, Mana Vikrama, sends troops to starve out the Portuguese Empire's Chale fortress. The Portuguese defender, Dom Jorge de Castro, is allowed to surrender the fort in November and the Portuguese are allowed to march out of the fort. De Castro is executed by the Portuguese Governor-General after returning to Portuguese controlled Goa.
- July 25 – St Olave's Grammar School is founded in Tooley Street, London.
- August 1 – The Ottoman conquest of Cyprus is concluded, by the surrender of Famagusta. Cyprus is established as an eyalet of the Ottoman Empire, and the first Turkish colony moves into the island.
- August 29 – Liliw, Laguna, Philippines is founded by Gat Tayaw, followers and residents as a municipality of Laguna.
- September 5 – John Erskine, Earl of Mar is selected by the Scottish royal family to be the new Regent of Scotland to rule on behalf of the 5-year-old King James VI. The Earl of Mar replaces Matthew Stewart, 4th Earl of Lennox, the King's grandfather, who was assassinated the day before by supporters of his daughter-in-law the imprisoned Mary, Queen of Scots.
- September 28 – The House of Commons of England introduces the first pro forma bill, symbolizing its authority over its own affairs.
- September 30 (12th day of 9th month of Genki) – In Japan, the Siege of Mount Hiei is carried out by Oda Nobunaga at Ōmi Province (now the Shiga Prefecture). After Nobunaga's 30,000 troops overwhelm the monks of the 4,000 warriors of the Sōhei, Nobunaga orders the massacre of more than 1,500 survivors.

==== October–December ====
- October 7 – Battle of Lepanto: Spanish, Venetian, and Papal naval forces, under Don John of Austria, defeat the Ottoman fleet of Müezzinzade Ali Pasha.
- November 4 – The Mexican Inquisition, for investigation and punishment of heresy against the Roman Catholic Church in the New World, begins with the first session of the Tribunal of the Holy Office of the Inquisition in New Spain.
- November 16 – Michele Bonelli is sent as the legate a latere by Pope Pius V to work directly with King Charles IX of France. From June 18 until his new assignment, Bonelli had been the legate to the King of Spain and the King of Portugal.
- November 20 – Clan Gordon defeats Clan Forbes in the Battle of Craibstone, fought near Aberdeen in Scotland. Clan Forbes sustains 300 deaths and 200 men are taken prisoner out of its original contingent of 900, while Clan Gordon suffers 200 deaths of its 800 men.
- December 24 – Henry XI, Duke of the German Duchy of Liegnitz (now part of Poland), who had increased the Duchy's debts from 80,000 thalers to 700,000 thalers over 11 years, attempts to get the representatives of the Congress of Estates to pledge their own goods and valuables as collateral for refinancing the debt. When the representatives of the different parts of the Duchy refuse, he has them jailed until they agree to pay taxes for 10 percent of the debt owed.

==== Date unknown ====
- Using mercury in the silver extraction process dramatically increases the output of the Potosí mine; thus begins the great silver flow that links the New and Old Worlds.
- The Swedish Church Ordinance 1571 creates the first complete order of the Protestant Swedish church. The church ordinance also includes a chapter about schooling, in which all children in the cities, regardless of sex, are to be given elementary schooling.
- Taipalsaari is founded.

=== 1572 ===
==== January–March ====
- January 16 – Thomas Howard, 4th Duke of Norfolk, is tried for treason, for his part in the Ridolfi plot to restore Catholicism in England. He is executed on June 2.
- February 13 – Elizabeth I of England issues a proclamation which revokes all commissions, on account of the frauds which they had fostered.
- February 19 – Harrow School is founded, with a royal charter from Queen Elizabeth I of England.
- February 28 – In what is now the Rajasthan state in India, Maharana Pratap is crowned as the new Rana of Mewar at the Kingdom's capital at Udaipur after the death of his father, Udai Singh II.
- March 2 – Mem de Sá, the Portuguese Governor-General of Brazil, dies after 14 years in office. He is succeeded by Lourenço da Veiga.
- March 11 – Pope Pius V issues the papal bull Supremi omnipotentis Dei, granting an indulgence reducing 50 days of punishment in the afterlife for Roman Catholics who recited the penitential psalms.
- March 28 – Queen Elizabeth I of England summons a new Parliament, which assembles on May 4.

==== April–June ====
- April 1 – Capture of Brielle: The Sea Beggars, Netherlandish Calvinist rebels, capture the port city of Brielle. This leads to a wave of uprisings in Holland and Zeeland against Spanish Habsburg rule, leaving most of those provinces (with the exception of Amsterdam) under rebel control.
- May 13 – Pope Gregory XIII succeeds Pope Pius V, as the 226th pope.
- June 14 (4th day of 5th month, Genki 3) – At the Battle of Kizaki, Shimazu Yoshihiro leads an army of just 300 men to defeat the 3,000 strong Ito clan of Itō Yoshisuke.
- June 25 – The Sea Beggars capture the city of Gorkum; several Roman Catholic priests are imprisoned.

==== July–September ====
- July 4 – The city council of Haarlem, one of the largest cities of the Netherlands, votes to join the Dutch Revolt against King Philip II of Spain. King Philip orders sent an army north under command of Don Fadrique, son of the Duke of Alva, to lead an army to conquer the rebelling cities.
- July 9 – The Sea Beggars hang 19 previously imprisoned Roman Catholic priests (the Martyrs of Gorkum) at Brielle.
- July 11 – Humphrey Gilbert leads 1,500 volunteers from England, on an expedition to assist the Sea Beggars.
- July 19 – Wanli Emperor of China ascends the throne at the age of nine; he will rule for 48 years.
- July 29–August 2 – Battle of Molodi: A large Crimean Tatar–Ottoman army which invaded Russia is routed.
- August 18 – Huguenot King Henry III of Navarre marries Margaret of Valois, sister of King Charles and daughter of Catherine de' Medici, in a supposed attempt to reconcile Protestants and Catholics in France.
- August 24 – St. Bartholomew's Day massacre: Catholics in Paris murder thousands of Protestants, including Gaspard de Coligny and Petrus Ramus, at the order of King Charles IX, with Catherine de Medici's connivance. Henry of Navarre and the Prince of Condé barely escape the same fate. This brings about the Fourth War of Religion in France.
- September 19 – The Siege of Mons, which started on June 23, ends with the recapture of Valenciennes by the Spanish Army from the Dutch Huguenots in what is now Belgium. Louis of Nassau, the Dutch rebel commander, surrenders to the Duke of Alba.
- September 24 –
  - Tupac Amaru and other Inca Empire nobles are executed in Peru at Cuzco on orders of the Spanish colonial Viceroy, Francisco de Toledo, who then carries out the destruction of the relics of the Incan civilization.
  - The Ottoman Empire begins the deportation of 10 percent of families of the provinces of Anatolia, Rum (Sivas), Karaman and Zülkadriye, mostly craftsmen or peasants, to the newly-conquered island of Cyprus. In exchange for relocating, the transferees are made exempt from taxes for two years.
- September 25 – The coronation of Rudolf as King of Hungary takes place at St. Martin's Cathedral in Pozsony (now Bratislava, Slovakia).

==== October–December ====
- October 2 – Spanish Fury at Mechelen: The mostly Catholic population of the Netherlands city of Mechelen (now in Belgium) surrenders to the Spanish Army and signifies its intention to offer no resistance, singing Catholic psalms of penitence to welcome the Catholic Spaniards. Nevertheless, the Duke of Alba authorizes his troops to conduct three days of slaughter, rape and pillaging.
- October 20 – Eighty Years' War – Relief of Goes: Soldiers of the Spanish Tercios wade across the estuary of the Scheldt, to relieve the siege of Goes in the Spanish Netherlands.
- November 9
  - Siege of Sancerre: Catholic forces of the king lay siege to Sancerre, a Huguenot stronghold in central France. The fortified city holds out for nearly eight months, without bombard artillery. This is one of the last times that slings are used in European warfare.
  - Supernova SN 1572 is first observed in the constellation Cassiopeia, by Cornelius Gemma. Tycho Brahe, who notes it two days later, will use it to challenge the prevailing view that stars do not change. The supernova remnant remains visible through 1574.
- November 14 – Residents of the Belgian city of Zutphen are massacred by the Spanish Army.
- November 22 – All but 60 of the 3,000 residents are massacred by the Spanish Army in the Belgian city of Naarden.
- December 10 – For administrative purposes, the Kingdom of Portugal divides its colony in Brazil into two colonies, with one Governor-General at Rio de Janeiro and another at Bahia. The two colonies will be reunified on April 12, 1578.
- December 11 – The Siege of Haarlem is begun by the Duke of Alva, Spanish Army commander in the Netherlands, and lasts until July 13, 1573.

==== Date unknown ====
- The Neo-Inca State in Vilcabamba, Peru, the last independent remnant of the Inca Empire, is conquered by Spain.
- Girolamo Mercuriale from Forlì (Italy) writes the work De morbis cutaneis ("On the diseases of the skin"), the first scientific tract on dermatology.
- Imaginary numbers are defined by Rafael Bombelli.
- Portugal's national epic Os Lusíadas by Luís de Camões is first published.
- Georg Braun begins publication of his urban atlas, Civitates orbis terrarum, in Cologne.

=== 1573 ===
==== January–March ====
- January 25 (22nd day of 12th month of Genki 3 – At the Battle of Mikatagahara in Japan, Takeda Shingen defeats Tokugawa Ieyasu.
- January 28
  - Articles of the Warsaw Confederation are signed, sanctioning religious freedom in Poland.
  - The Croatian–Slovene Peasant Revolt, started by Matija Gubec, breaks out against the Croatian nobility, but is suppressed after 18 days.
- February 2 – The Wanli Era begins in Ming dynasty China on the first New Year after 9-year-old Zhu Yijun ascends the throne.
- February 6 – In the battle of Kerestinec, General Gašpar Alapić defeats the rebel troops led by Gubec.
- February 9 – Croatian troops, led by General Alapic, defeat the peasant rebellion in the Battle of Stubica, then begin a violent campaign of vengeance against the conquered rebels. Rebellion leaders Matija Gubec and Ivan Pasanec are taken as prisoners of war for a trial for treason at Zagreb.
- February 11 – Fourth War of Religion: France's Marshal Henri de Montmorency, begins the Siege of Sommières in southern France. The Huguenots, French Protestants, hold out for almost two months against Montmorency's Catholic troops.
- February 15 – On orders of the Croatian Viceroy Juraj Drašković, Matija Gubec, the defeated leader of the Croatian–Slovene Peasant Revolt is publicly tortured with the placement of a red-hot iron crown on his head, dragged through the streets of Zagreb, and then dismembered.
- February 16–March – The siege of Noda Castle begins near what is now the city of Shinshiro in Japan, after the leader of the Takeda clan, the warlord Takeda Shingen, is shot by a sniper after offering generous terms of surrender to the Tokugawa clan, led by Tokugawa Ieyasu. By March 10, the Noda Castle surrenders.
- February 23– In the province of Munster in Ireland, the first Desmond Rebellion, led by James FitzMaurice FitzGerald, cousin of the Earl of Desmond, ends at Kilmallock as FitzGerald makes a humiliating surrender to John Perrot, the provincial leader.
- March 7 – The Ottoman–Venetian War (1570–1573) is ended by a peace treaty, confirming the transfer of control of Cyprus from the Republic of Venice to the Ottoman Empire, and also confirming Turkish occupation of the more fertile region of Dalmatia.

==== April–June ====
- April 1 – On his expedition to the New World, Francis Drake and his crew make their most lucrative capture by seizing a wagon train of silver at Panama, near the settlement of Nombre de Dios.
- April 5 – 1573 Polish–Lithuanian royal election: Polish and Lithuanian nobles gather at Warsaw to elect a successor to King Sigismund II Augustus, who had died the previous July 7. The vote comes down to four candidates, from France, the Holy Roman Empire, Sweden and Russia.
- April 9 – The Siege of Sommières ends with the surrender of the Huguenot defenders, who are spared retaliation by General Montmorency, despite the loss of 2,500 royal troops.
- April 22 – Eighty Years' War: The Battle of Borsele is fought as a fleet of Spanish ships is intercepted by Dutch Calvinist rebels (the Geuzen). While some of the ships are able to complete their mission of supplying the Spanish-governed Netherlands cities of Middelburg and Arnemuiden, most are forced to retreat to Amberes in the Spanish Netherlands, now Antwerp in Belgium.
- May 16– The Henry, Duke of Anjou, son of the late King Henry II of France is elected to the throne of the Polish–Lithuanian Commonwealth by the Polish nobility, after being nominated on May 11.
- May 26 – Battle of Haarlemmermeer: Geuzen ships, attempting to break the siege of Haarlem, are defeated by a combined Spanish and Amsterdam fleet.
- June 24 – After Henry, Duke of Anjou learns that he has been elected the King of Poland, he agrees to negotiate an end to the Siege of La Rochelle, which has continued for almost nine months against the Huguenots in the western French city, and reaches an agreement with the Huguenot defender, the Count of Montgomery.

==== July–September ====
- July 6 – Córdoba, in the Viceroyalty of Peru, is founded by Jerónimo Luis de Cabrera.
- July 11 – The Edict of Boulogne is signed by Charles IX of France, granting limited rights to Huguenots, and ending the Fourth War of Religion in France.
- July 12 – Siege of Haarlem: Spanish forces under the Duke of Alva capture Haarlem, after a seven-month siege.
- August 21 – The Duke of Alva begins the siege of Alkmaar in North Holland, before retreating after seven weeks.
- August 27 – Oda Nobunaga drives the 15th Ashikaga shōgun Ashikaga Yoshiaki out of Kyoto, effectively destroying the Ashikaga shogunate, and historically ending the Muromachi and Sengoku periods. The Azuchi–Momoyama period of Japan begins.
- September 16 – In Japan, elimination of the Asakura clan is completed by Oda Nobunaga after the siege of Hikida Castle and the siege of Ichijōdani Castle are completed in eight days.
- September 26 – The Azai clan is eliminated by Oda Nobunaga after the four day siege of Odani Castle in Japan.

==== October–December ====
- October 8 – The Spanish abandon the siege of the city of Alkmaar and concede the city to the Geuzen, the Dutch Calvinist rebels.
- October 11 – The Spanish under John of Austria take Tunis with little resistance.
- November 15 – Santa Fe, Argentina, is founded by Juan de Garay.
- November 29 – The Duke of Alva resigns as the Spanish Governor-General of the Netherlands, and is succeeded by Luis de Requesens, who attempts to pursue a more conciliatory policy.
- December 3 – The French Duke of Anjou, recently elected as King Henry of Poland, departs from Metz with an entourage of 1,200 people, arriving at Kraków on February 18.
- December 11 – The Governor of Portuguese India issues an edict depriving Hindu followers of most rights, including the right to receive Jonoa, the share of the village community income.
- December 17 – Portuguese colonists are expelled from the Maldives, where Portugal has had a presence since 1558, by order of the Sultan's son, Mohamed Bodu Takurufanu al-Azam.
- December 23 – In the Republic of Venice, the Council of Ten votes to grant safe conduct to Venice for Spanish and Portuguese Jews.

==== Date unknown ====
- Sarsa Dengel, emperor of Ethiopia, defeats the Oromo in a battle near Lake Zway.
- The first Spanish galleon, laden with silver for the porcelain and silk trade with the Ming Dynasty of China, lands at Manila in the Philippines. This occasion marks the beginning of the Spanish silver trade to China, that will trump that of the Portuguese, the latter of whom acted as an intermediary between the silver mines of Japan, and the luxury items in China to be purchased with that silver. Most of the silver entering China comes from what is now Mexico, Bolivia, and Peru in the New World.
- The Luzhou Laojiao liquor is made.
- Queen Elizabeth's Grammar School for Boys, Barnet, England, is formed.

=== 1574 ===
==== January–March ====
- January 22 – Mohammed II becomes the new Sultan of Morocco upon the death of his father, Abdallah al-Ghalib.
- January 27 – At Agra, Bhagwant Das becomes the new Maharaja of the Kingdom of Amber in what is now India's state of Uttar Pradesh, upon the death of his grandfather, the Raja Bharmal.
- January 29 – Off of the coast of the Netherlands, the Battle of the Scheldt is fought between the Spanish Fleet and a combined Dutch and English fleet of ships. The Spanish Navy loses 15 ships and 1,200 men are killed, wounded or captured.
- February – The fifth War of Religion against the Huguenots begins in France.
- March 2 – Swedish troops attack Wesenberg Castle in Estonia and lose at least 1,000 men in attempting to capture it from the Russian Army.
- March 17 – Within the Swedish Army, a fight between Scottish and German mercenaries is fought. By the end of the battle, several hundred Scots are dead, compared to 30 Germans.

==== April–June ====
- April 14 – Battle of Mookerheyde: Spanish forces under Sancho de Avila defeat the rebel forces of Louis of Nassau, who is killed.
- April – The fort of Narnala in the Deccan falls to the Ahmadnagar Sultanate, and with it the Berar sultanate is annexed by Ahmadnagar.
- May 30 – On the death of King Charles IX of France of a tubercular condition at the Château de Vincennes, he is succeeded by his brother King Henry of Poland, who becomes King Henry III of France. His mother, Catherine de' Medici, acts as Regent, until Henry arrives from Poland.
- June 10
  - Construction of The White Tower begins in the Czech Republic.
  - Manila, Philippines gains cityhood.

==== July–September ====
- July 12 – Selim II, Sultan of the Ottoman Empire, launches the attempt to reclaim Tunis from control of the Holy Roman Empire with more than 250 warships and 100,000 troops, and to restore North Africa to Muslim control.
- July 13 – In Berlin, John George, Elector of Brandenburg, orders the founding of the Evangelisches Gymnasium zum Grauen Kloster, which remains 450 years later as one of the most prestigious preparatory schools in Germany.
- July 26 – Kılıç Ali Pasha begins construction of an Ottoman fortress on the coastline of Morocco, directly across Andalusia in mainland Spain.
- August 24 – The Tunisian port of La Goulette falls to Ottoman troops after six weeks.
- August 30 – Guru Ram Das becomes the fourth of the Sikh gurus.
- September 13 – The last Holy Roman Imperial defenders surrender Tunis to the Ottoman General Cığalazade Yusuf Sinan Pasha.
- September – A plot to assassinate John III of Sweden is discovered, headed by Charles de Mornay and implicating Charles Dancay, Hogenskild Bielke, Gustaf Banér, Pontus De la Gardie, Princess Elizabeth of Sweden, Princess Cecilia of Sweden, and Duke Charles.

==== October–December ====
- October 3 – The city of Leiden, besieged by the Spanish, is relieved by a Sea Beggars fleet under Louis Boisot.
- November 22 – The Juan Fernández Islands in the South Pacific Ocean are discovered by Spanish sailor Juan Fernández.
- November 29 – Limahong and Juan de Salcedo quarrel during the Battle of Manila.
- December 15 – Selim II, the 50-year-old Sultan of the Ottoman Empire, is killed after becoming drunk, falling, and fracturing his skull on the floor of the Topkapi Palace.
- December 22 – Prince Murad bin-Selim of the Ottoman Empire completes the murders, by strangulation, of his four younger brothers, Süleyman, Abdüllah, Osman, and Cihangir.
- December 27 – Murad III, eldest son of Selim II, is formally enthroned as the Ottoman Sultan after eliminating his other brothers as rival claimants to the throne.

==== Undated ====
- Prince El-Mirza of Kakheti is defeated in his bid for the throne by his half-brother, Alexander II.
- The Liturgical Battle royal between the Reformation and Counter Reformation begins in Sweden, and continues until the Uppsala Synod of 1593.
- La Alameda, Seville, is laid out in Spain, as Europe's first public garden.

=== 1575 ===
==== January–March ====
- January 21 – Queen Elizabeth I of England grants a monopoly on producing printed sheet music, to Thomas Tallis and William Byrd.
- February 8 – William I of Orange founds Leiden University.
- February 11 – Portuguese explorer Paulo Dias de Novais arrives in southeastern Africa to colonize what is now Angola.
- February 13 – The formal coronation of Henry III as King of France takes place at the Reims Cathedral. Henry inherited the throne on May 30, 1574, upon the death of his older brother, Charles IX. He marries Louise de Lorraine-Vaudémont.
- March 3 – Battle of Tukaroi: The Mughal Empire decisively defeats the Karrani dynasty of Bengal. The battle took place near the village of Tukaroi in present-day Balasore District of Odisha.

==== April–June ====
- April 2 – English privateer Gilbert Horseley and his crew sail into the Bay of Honduras in Central America and conduct three days of raids of Spanish settlements and ships.
- April 6 – Antoine I de Gramont, Lord Sovereign of the Principality of Bidache in the French Pyrennees Mountains, promulgates a legal code for his people.
- April 18 – Bayinnaung, King of Burma, returns to his capital at Pegu from Vientiane after installing Voravongsa I as the Burmese-appointed monarch of the Kingdom of Lan Xang (now Laos).
- May 12 – KIng Henry III of France, who had been selected in 1573 by the nobles of Poland and Lithuania to be King of Poland as Henryk Walezy, is stripped of his Polish and Lithuanian titles after failing to return to Kraków by the deadline imposed by the Polish nobility.
- May 24 – In an attempt to reform the Eastern Orthodox Church, Lutheran missionaries meet with Jeremias II Tranos, the Ecumenical Patriarch, at his residence in Constantinople, and present him with a Greek translation of the Augsburg Confession. Jeremias sends the missionaries, Jakob Andreae and Martin Crusius, three rebuttals to define the objections he has to the Lutheran document, declaring the reasons why the Eastern Orthodoxy has no desire for reformation.
- June 24 – William I of Orange marries Charlotte of Bourbon.
- June 28 – Battle of Nagashino: Oda Nobunaga defeats Takeda Katsuyori in Japan's first modern battle.

==== July–September ====
- July 7 – Raid of the Redeswire: Sir John Carmichael defeats Sir John Forster, in the last battle between England and Scotland.
- July 26 – Edmund Grindal succeeds Matthew Parker as Archbishop of Canterbury.
- August 5 – Henry Sidney is appointed Lord Lieutenant of Ireland.
- September 22
  - Paulo Dias de Novais becomes the first Portuguese Governor of Angola.
  - Ottoman forces led by Ferhad Pasha Sokolović defeat the Austrian Army, led by Herbard VIII von Auersperg, in the Battle of Budačka. Auersperg is decapitated and Ferhad Pasha leaves Croatia with the head as a trophy.
- September 1 –As a result of the Eighty Years' War, the government of the Kingdom of Spain is in bankruptcy and stops paying its troops, beginning in March.
- September 25 – At St. Vitus Cathedral in Prague, Rudolf of Habsburg, son of the Holy Roman Emperor Maximilian II, is crowned King of Bohemia by the Archbishop Antonín Brus of Mohelnice.
- September 26 – Future Spanish author and playwright Miguel de Cervantes, then 28, is taken hostage by the Ottoman Albanian pirate Arnaut Mami after an attack on the Spanish galley Sol off of the Catalan coast. Cervantes spends the next five years as a slave in Algeria before his family pays a ransom to free him.

==== October–December ====
- October 10 – Battle of Dormans: Catholic forces under Henry I, Duke of Guise defeat the Protestants, capturing Philippe de Mornay among others.
- October 22 – The city of Villa de la Asunción (today Aguascalientes) is founded in New Spain, by permission from Philip II of Spain.
- November 8 – The Sejm of Poland meets in Warsaw to elect a new King of Poland after King Henryk has failed to return from France, and considers 11 candidates.
- November 9 – Ferhad Pasha Sokolović returns to Constantinople in triumph with the head of General Auersperg as a trophy after his September 22 victory at Budecka.
- November 22 – Portuguese navigator Manuel de Mesquita Perestrelo departs from Mozambique on a mission for to map the coastline, completing the task on March 13.
- December 12 – Under pressure from Papal nuncio Vincenzo Lauro when a majority of the Sejm has still not agreed on a candidate, the Primate of Poland, Jakub Uchański, declares Maximilian II new King of Poland and Grand Duke of Lithuania.
- December 16 – An earthquake hits Valdivia.

==== Date unknown ====
- Russians occupy Pernau in western Estonia, and the fortress of Weissenstein.
- The seat of the Audiencia Real in Chile moves from Concepción to Santiago.
- Abraham Ortelius becomes a geographer to Philip II of Spain.
- The bubonic plague decimates Venice.
- Captains of vessels flying the Spanish flag are legally required to maintain a logbook.

=== 1576 ===
==== January–March ====
- January 20 – Martín Enríquez de Almanza, Viceroy of New Spain, founds the settlement of León, in what is later the state of Guanajuato in Mexico.
- January 20 – The establishment of Roman Catholic Diocese of Macau.
- January 25 – Portuguese explorer Paulo Dias de Novais founds the settlement of São Paulo da Assumpção de Loanda on the southwestern coast of Africa, now Luanda, capital of Angola.
- February 5 – King Henry of Navarre, captive in France since 1572 and alive only because he converted to Catholicism, escapes to Tours and formally reverts to the Protestant faith. Dupuy, Trevor N.; Johnson, Curt; Bongard, David L. (1995).
- February 8 – Peter Wentworth, a Puritan M.P. of the Parliament of England, is arrested in the middle of giving an address criticizing "rumours and messages" given to suppress freedom of speech. When he says that "the devil was the first author of them, from whom proceedeth nothing but wickedness", he is interrupted and taken to the Tower of London for imprisonment.
- March 11 – The city of Fez, part of the Saadi Sultanate in what is now Morocco is captured by Ottoman forces led by Abd al-Malik, in an attempt to overthrow the Sultan Muhammed al-Mutawakkil and to make the Sultanate a vassal of the Ottoman Empire.

==== April–June ====
- April 14 – Ishiyama Hongan-ji War: In Japan, the Third Battle of Ishiyama begins as Oda Nobunaga sends 10,000 soldiers against the Ashikaga shogunate to capture the Honganji Temple.
- April 25 – Documents for the Union of Delft are signed by Dutch leader Willem van Oranj to create a federation of Holland and Zeeland.
- May 1 – Stephen Báthory, the Hungarian Prince of Transylvania, is crowned king of Poland.
- May 6 – The Edict of Beaulieu, negotiated by Monsieur Francois, Duke of Anjou and brother of King Henry III of France, ends the Fifth War of Religion. By the terms of the "Peace of Monsieur" that led to agreement on the Edict, freedom of worship is granted again to the Protestant Hugueonots.
- May 14 – Tahmasp I, the Shah of Safavid Iran for almost 52 years, is accidentally poisoned after being treated by the palace physician, Abu Naser Gilani. Tahmasp's death is followed by a deadly struggle for control of Iran.
- May 15 – Tahmap's son Haydar Mirza Safavi declares himself the new Safavid Shah of Iran, the day after the death of his father. Later in the day, Haydar is assassinated by members of the palace guard who are loyal to Haydar's brother, Ismail Mirza. Haydar attempts to disguise himself as a woman in the royal harem, but is discovered and beheaded.
- May 27 – An attempt by the Dutch Republic to end the Siege of Zierikzee and free the city from Spain fails after Spanish forces are tipped off about a surprise attack. Dutch Admiral Lodewijk van Boisot is killed in the battle.
- June 13 – Dutch forces withdraw from their attempt to free Zierikzee, and the city is left to defend itself. The defenders then begin negotiations with the Spanish attackers, commanded by General Cristóbal de Mondragón.
- June 18 – In the Battle of Haldighati in India, Mughal Imperial forces, led by Man Singh I of Amer, decisively defeat the Mewar Kingdom led by Maharana Pratap.

==== July–September ====
- July 4 – Alonso de Solís, who was appointed by Spain as Governor of the colony of La Florida, is killed in the colonial capital at San Augustin, now the U.S. city of St. Augustine, Florida.
- July 11 – English navigator Martin Frobisher sights Greenland.
- July 12 – The Mughal Empire annexes Bengal after defeating the Bengal Sultanate at the Battle of Rajmahal.
- July 25 – Rebellious Spanish troops plunder the Flemish city of Aalst and then use it as their base of operations to attack other cities.
- July 29 – The Siege of Zierikzee in the Netherlands ends with the surrender of the defenders to the Spanish Army.
- August 11 – English navigator Martin Frobisher, on his search for the Northwest Passage through North America, enters the bay now named after him in Canada.
- August 23 – On the island of Kyūshū in Japan, near what is now Takaharu, Miyazaki prefecture, Takahara Castle of the Itō clan is captured by 30,000 men led by the warlord Shimazu Yoshihisa, after a siege of four days.
- September 1 – Ismail Mirza, who has proclaimed himself the Shah of Safavid Iran, marches into the capital at Qazvin and ascends the throne as Shah Ismail II.
- September 2 – Simeon Bekbulatovich, who has served since the previous October as the Grand Prince of All Russia after the Tsar Ivan IV ("Ivan the Terrible") had taken leave of absence from the throne, steps down as Ivan returns to Moscow. Ivan rewards Bekbulatovich with the title of Grand Prince of Tver.
- September 4 – In Brussels, rebels led by Jacques de Glymes of Brabant arrest the members of the Council of State that administers the city.
- September 8 – The States General of the Netherlands is convened by the leaders of the States of Brabant and the County of Hainaut in order to respond to mutineering Spanish troops.
- September 10 – After a siege that has lasted a year and two days, the Spanish Army abandons its siege of the Dutch city of Woerden.
- September 16 – The States of Flanders convene a meeting near Ghent, where the Roman Catholic clergy, led by Martinus Rythovius, insist on measures to protect the practice of the Catholic faith in the predominantly Protestant Low Countries.

==== October–December ====
- October 12 – Maximilian II, ruler of the Holy Roman Empire and most of Central Europe since 1564, dies suddenly in Regensburg while preparing for an Imperial invasion of Poland. Maximilian's 24-year-old son Rudolf, King of the Romans as well as the King of Hungary and of Bohemia, proceeds to Vienna to assume the Imperial Throne.
- October 20 – Spanish rebels plunder the city of Maastricht in Flanders and kill many of the civilian residents in what is later called the "Spaanse Furie" or Fury of Spain.
- October 26 – In Germany, Ludwig of Simmern becomes the new Elector Palatine of the Rhine 10 days after the death of his father, Frederick III, taking office at the Palatinate capital at Heidelberg as Ludwig VI.
- November 1 – Rudolf II is crowned Holy Roman Emperor.
- November 4 – Eighty Years' War – Sack of Antwerp: In the Low Countries, mutinous Spanish soldiers sack Antwerp; after three days the city is nearly destroyed.
- November 8 – Pacification of Ghent: The States General of the Netherlands meet and unite to oppose pillaging Spanish mutineers.
- November 9 – Shah Ismail II of Iran begins the execution of all persons whom he believes are a threat to his rule, starting with his half-brothers Suleiman Mirza, Governor of Shiraz, and Mustafa Mirza. Over the next seven months, Ismail arranges the execution of six other half-brothers, Mustafa, Junayd, Mahmud, Qoli, Ahmad, and Murza.
- December 6 – Representatives of France's three estates convene at the Estates General of 1576 in Blois at the invitation of King Henri III. Of the 383 delegates, the 187 of the Third Estate (commoners) narrowly vote in favor of outlawing Protestantism and expelling Protestant pastors from the kingdom, while the 110 of the First Estate (clergy) and 86 of the Second Estate (the nobility) strongly oppose ending hostility in the name of religious tolerance.
- December 19 – Representatives of the nobility of the Second Estate vote in favor of outlawing Protestantism in France.
- December 22 – Representatives of the clergy of the First Estate join the Second vote in favor of outlawing Protestantism. By January, the Edict of Beaulieu fails and the Sixth War of Religion begins later in 1577.
- December – James Burbage opens the first permanent public playhouse in Britain, The Theatre.

==== Date unknown ====
- The 1576 Cocoliztli epidemic causes millions of deaths in the territory of New Spain, in modern-day Mexico.
- An early example of autobiography is written in English, by Thomas Whythorne.
- The Loci Communes of Peter Martyr Vermigli (d. 1562), edited by Robert le Maçon, are published in London.
- The following schools are founded in England:
  - Dartford Grammar School, by William d'Aeth, Edward Gwyn and William Vaughn.
  - Sutton Valence School, by William Lambe.
- Konstanty Wasyl Ostrogski founds Ostroh Academy, the first university-level school in Eastern Europe.

=== 1577 ===
==== January–March ====
- January 9 – The second Union of Brussels is formed, first without the Protestant counties of Holland and Zeeland (which is accepted by King Philip II of Spain), later with the Protestants, which means open rebellion of the whole of the Netherlands.
- February 12 – The "Perpetual Edict", providing for the removal of Spanish troops from what is now the Netherlands, is signed in the city of Marche-en-Famenne in the Spanish Netherlands (now Belgium) by the Spanish Governor-General, Don Juan de Austria and representatives of the Dutch rebellion. The Perpetual Edict will last only five months, before Don Juan begins new attacks on the rebels.
- February 23 – The new Shah of Iran, Ismail II, has most of the advisers of his late father executed, including Prince Ibrahim Mirza.
- March 17 – The Cathay Company is formed, to send Martin Frobisher back to the New World for more gold.

==== April–June ====
- April 17 – Battle of Lubieszów: General Jan Zborowski leads the army of the Polish–Lithuanian Commonwealth in the catastrophic defeat of most of Jan Winkelbruch's 12,000 rebels and mercenaries from the Commonwealth's richest city, Danzig, killing 4,420 of the men and capturing another 5,000 as prisoners. Only 88 of Zborowski's 2,500 troops are killed. The Danzig Rebellion ends at the end of the year.
- May 27 – English explorer Martin Frobisher departs from Blackwall in his flagship, HMS Ayde, along with the ships Gabriel and Michael, to begin the English expedition to North America.
- May 28 – The Bergen Book, better known as the Solid Declaration of the Formula of Concord, one of the Lutheran confessional writings, is published. The earlier version, known as the Torgau Book (1576), had been condensed into an Epitome; both documents are part of the 1580 Book of Concord.
- June 11 – Sebastiano Venier becomes the new Doge of the Republic of Venice, succeeding Alvise Mocenigo, who died on June 4.
- June 12 – The French city of Issoire surrenders and 3,000 of its Protestant Huguenots are massacred by the troops of the French Catholic General Francis, Duke of Anjou, on orders by King Henry III of France. The massacre is carried out 20 months after the October 15, 1575 killing of Catholic residents by Matthieu Merle. Most of Issoire's buildings are torn down, and the royal troops leave an inscription on a pillar, Ici fut Issoire ("Here stood Issoire.")
- June 13 – Mirza Salman Jaberi is appointed as the new Grand Vizier of Persia by Shah Ismail II, replacing Mirza Shokrollah Isfahani.
- June 29 – Mehmed II Giray becomes the new Khan of Crimea for the Ottoman Empire, after the death of his father, Devlet I Giray, from a plague.

==== July–September ====
- July 9 – Ludvig Munk is appointed Governor-General of Norway.
- August 1 – Göran Boije becomes the new Duke of Estonia, ruling what is, at the time, a dominion of the Swedish Empire.
- August 23 – Martin Frobisher ends his expedition to Canada and he and his crew begin the journey back to England on the ships Ayde, Gabriel and Michael.
- September 8 – (11th waning of Tawthalin 939 ME) Min Phalaung, King of Arakan in what is now northern Myanmar and southern Bangladesh on the Bay of Bengal, enters his new palace in dedication ceremonies at the capital at Mrauk U.
- September 17 – The Treaty of Bergerac is signed between Henry III of France and the Huguenots.
- September 23 – The first Inuit people to see Europe— Kalicho, Arnaq, and Arnaq's son, Nutaaq— are brought as captives of Martin Frobisher when HMS Gabriel arrived in England at Bristol. All three were captured on Baffin Island, and none of the three survive to the end of the year.

==== October–December ====
- October 19 – In Italy, Giovanni Battista Gentile Pignolo is elected as the new Doge of the Republic of Genoa for a two-year term, replacing Prospero Centurione Fattinanti.
- October 28 – In Flanders (now part of Belgium), two Protestant members of the city council of Ghent, Jan van Hembyze and François van Ryhove, proclaim the Calvinist Republic of Ghent. The stadtholder of Flanders, Philippe III de Croÿ, Duke of Aarschot is arrested, along with the Roman Catholic bishops Martin Rythovius of Ypres and Remi Drieux of Bruges. The Calvinist Republic will exist for seven years until the Spanish conquest of Ghent in 1584.
- November 6 – The first recorded observation from Earth of the Great Comet of 1577 takes place by Aztec astronomers in Mexico, followed by reports from Italy on November 7 and Japan on November 8. Astronomer Tycho Brahe will track the comet from November 13 until January 26 before it departs the Solar System.
- November 13 – In the Battle of Tedorigawa, Uesugi Kenshin's forces decisively defeat the forces of Oda Nobunaga, in what will be Kenshin's last victory before his death the following year.
- November 19 – With defeat coming close in the siege of Shigisan, Matsunaga Hisahide commits suicide.
- December 13 – Francis Drake leaves Plymouth, England, aboard the Pelican, with four other ships and 164 men, on an expedition against the Spanish, along the Pacific coast of the Americas, which will become his circumnavigation.

==== Date unknown ====
- Supposed massacre of the MacDonald inhabitants of the Scottish island of Eigg, by the Clan MacLeod.
- Mehmed Paša Sokolović Bridge over the Drina in Višegrad is completed in the Ottoman Empire.
- The church in San Pedro de Atacama is built, in the Atacama Desert in Chile.
- Casiodoro de Reina publishes his "Declaracion, o confesion de fe", the first and only Spanish confession of faith in the post Reformation period.

=== 1578 ===
==== January–March ====
- January 13 – The Siege of Gvozdansko ends in the Kingdom of Croatia as Ottoman Empire troops led by Ferhad Pasha Sokolović capture the fortress at Gvozdansko.
- January 31 – Battle of Gembloux: Spanish forces under Don John of Austria and Alexander Farnese defeat the Dutch; Farnese begins to recover control of the French-speaking Southern Netherlands.
- February 6 – Pope Gregory XIII issues the papal bull Illius fulti praesidio and creates the Diocese of Manila, the first Roman Catholic diocese in the Philippines, with Domingo de Salazar as the first Bishop of Manila. The diocese will be raised to the status of archdiocese on August 14, 1595.
- February 8 – The city council of Amsterdam in the Netherlands ratifies a treaty placing the city under the authority of Willem, Prince of Orange, and joining the States of Holland.
- February 12 – Mohammad Khodabanda, older brother of the late Shah Ismail II, begins his reign as the new Shah of Persia (now Iran) after entering the Persian capital at Qazvin, after removing his sister Pari Khan Khanum, who had exercised regal authority after Ismail's death. His first act as ruler is to have Pari Khan Khanum strangled to death.
- February 13 – Two days after the Battle of Gembloux, Spanish troops capture the city of Leuven, forcing Willem, Prince of Orange, to flee Brussels and relocate to Antwerp.Geoffrey Parker, The Dutch Revolt (Cornell University Press, 1977) p.186
- March 11 – Nicolò da Ponte is elected as the new Doge of the Republic of Venice after 44 ballots, following the March 3 death of Sebastiano Venier.
- March 20
  - James Douglas, 4th Earl of Morton, the last of the regents for King James VI of Scotland, resigns after having served as regent since November 24, 1572.
  - The Belgian city of Bruges, controlled by Spain, falls to Dutch rebels.

==== April–June ====
- April 23 – (17th day of 3rd month, Tensho 6) The Siege of Otate begins in Japan after the death of Uesugi Kenshin, the warlord of the Echigo Province.
- April 27 – The Duel of the Mignons claims the lives of two favorites of Henry III of France, and two favourites of Henry I, Duke of Guise.
- May 26 – The Alteratie takes place in Amsterdam, expelling the 24 Catholic members of the 40-man city government, and forming a new council is formed with 30 Calvinist Protestants and 10 Catholics.
- May 31 – Martin Frobisher sails from Harwich in England with 15 ships to North America, where he will arrive at Frobisher Bay in July on his third expedition.
- June 11 – Humphrey Gilbert is granted letters patent from the English crown to establish a colony in North America.
- June 20 – The Frobisher expedition reaches Greenland.
- June 30 – After having come into conflict on May 17 with his fellow officer, Thomas Doughty, during their circumnavigation of the world, Francis Drake puts Doughty on trial while the flagship Pelican is docked at what is now Argentina. A jury of sailors convicts Doughty of treason and attempted mutiny. Doughty is beheaded on July 2.

==== July–September ====
- July 2 – The Frobisher expedition reaches Canada and enters what is now Frobisher Bay. One of the ships, the Dennis, is wrecked on an iceberg.
- July 31
  - At the Battle of Rijmenam, fought near Antwerp in what is now Belgium, a combined Dutch and English force under the command of the Count of Boussu and England's John Norreys defeats Spanish troops commanded by Don Juan de Austria.
  - According to some accounts, Englishman Martin Frobisher holds the first Thanksgiving celebration by Europeans in Canada, on Newfoundland, after he and his fleet encounter two ships that they feared had been lost. However, the celebration involves no feast and is limited to a sermon by the expedition's minister and Frobisher's men giving praise.
- August 4 – King Sebastian of Portugal is killed in the Battle of Alcácer Quibir in North Africa while fighting Moors kill. Sebastian's elderly uncle, Cardinal Henry, is named as the heir to the throne, initiating a succession crisis in Portugal.
- August 20–September 6 – After renaming this flagship, Pelican to the Golden Hind, Francis Drake and his fleet begin their passage through the Strait of Magellan.
- August 31 – The Forbisher expedition departs North America for its journey back to England.
- September 6 – After 16 days travel, the fleet of Francis Drake completes its traverse of the Strait of Magellan between the tip of South America and Tierra del Fuego. Upon entering the Pacific Ocean, the fleet encounters violent storms. The supply ship Marigold, with over 100 men under the command of John Thomas, is lost with all hands off of Cape Horn. The rest of the fleet continues its voyage around the world.

==== October–December ====
- October 1 – Alessandro Farnese succeeds his uncle, Don John, as Governor of the Spanish Netherlands.
- October 21 – Battle of Wenden: The Russians are defeated by the Swedes, who proceed to take Polotsk.
- November 19 – Humphrey Gilbert and Walter Ralegh set out from Plymouth in England, leading an expedition to establish a colony in North America. They will be forced to turn back six months later.
- December 9 – After more than five years of combat in southern France, the Protestant Huguenot citadel of Ménerbes negotiates a surrender to its French Catholic attackers.

==== Date unknown ====
- Battle of the Spoiling Dyke at Trumpan on the Scottish Isle of Skye: the Clan MacLeod are victorious over the MacDonalds of Uist in a feud.
- The Ottoman Empire conquers Abkhazia.
- Sarsa Dengel, Emperor of Ethiopia, defeats and kills Bahr negus Yeshaq along with his Ottoman allies, finally ending his rebellion.
- Sonam Gyrso receives from Prince Atlan Khan the title of Talaï, and becomes the third Dalai Lama of Tibet.
- The last outbreak of sweating sickness occurs in England.
- The Portuguese assist Lord Ōmura Sumitada, the first Christian Japanese daimyo, in repulsing an assault on Nagasaki by the Ryūzōji clan.
- Fur trade begins in Newfoundland in North America.

=== 1579 ===
==== January–March ====
- January 6 – The Union of Arras unites the southern Netherlands under the Duke of Parma, governor in the name of king Philip II of Spain.
- January 23 – The Union of Utrecht unites the northern Netherlands in a confederation called the United Provinces. William I of Orange becomes Stadtholder, and the Duc d'Anjou, younger brother of Henry III of France, is invited to become hereditary sovereign.
- February 4 – The Ghent Republic joins the Union of Utrecht.
- February 28 – The seizure in September by Willem IV van den Bergh, of the Boxmeer Castle in September in the Netherlands is condemned by the other Dutch members of the Union of Utrecht.
- March 1 – Off of the coast of what is now Ecuador, the English galleon Golden Hind, captained by Francis Drake, captures the Spanish freighter Nuestra Señora de la Concepción (unofficially called "Cagafuego") and its cargo, including 26 tons of silver and 1,000 pounds of gold.
- March 2 – Battle of Borgerhout in Flanders (now Belgium): Spanish troops under the command of the Duke of Parma overwhelm rebels fighting for the Union of Utrecht.
- March 12 – The Siege of Maastricht, a center of the Dutch resistance to Spanish rule, is started in the Netherlands by Spanish troops under the command of Alexander Farnese, Duke of Parma. The siege will last almost four months before Maastricht falls on July 1.

==== April–June ====
- April 10 – In the village of Cuers in France, near Toulon rebel peasants kill 600 nobles and upper-class gentlemen of the Catholic League serving the Count of Carces.
- May 17 – The Treaty of Arras is concluded between Spain (represented by the Duke of Parma), and members of the Union of Arras that had been formed in January. The Union of Utrecht continues its resistance against Spain while the County of Hainaut, the County of Artois, and the cities of Douai, Lille, Orchies and Arras agree to a separate peace under Spanish rule.
- May 21 – Battle of Mimaomote: In Japan, Doi Kiyonaga defeats the forces of Kumu Yorinobu.
- June 17 – Francis Drake, during his circumnavigation of the world, lands in modern-day California, which he claims for Queen Elizabeth I. With an English claim here and in Newfoundland, it becomes the basis for English colonial charters which will claim all land from the Atlantic to the Pacific, from "sea to sea." Drake's claim is called Nova Albion (New England), and subsequent maps will show all lands north of New Spain and New Mexico under this name.

==== July–September ====
- July 1 – Maastricht surrenders to Spanish troops after a surprise attack by the Duke of Parma, who had besieged the city for more than three months.
- July 13 – Karlovac in Croatia is founded.
- July 17 – James FitzMaurice FitzGerald lands with a small force of Irish, Spanish, and Italian troops at Smerwick, on the Dingle Peninsula in south-western Ireland, and commences the Second Desmond Rebellion against the rule in Ireland of Elizabeth I of England.
- August 6 – In the Spanish-controlled Netherlands, the representatives of the Union of Utrecht declare that they will no longer respect the authority of King Philip of Spain.
- August 17 – "Yasuke", a man of African origin who has been hired as a manager by the Chancellor of the Realm, Oda Nobunaga, arrives in Japan. Called "The Black Samurai" in dramatizations of his experience, he begins a service of three years to the Chancellor, ending on June 21, 1582.
- August 30 – Livonian War: In what is now Belarus, the city of Polotsk falls to the forces of Stephen Báthory, Grand Duke of Lithuania and King of Poland.
- September 10 – (5th waning of Tawthalin 941 ME) In the Kingdom of Mrauk U in what is now Myanmar and Bangladesh, King Min Phalaung becomes the owner of the first of three white elephants, and gives himself the title of Hsinbyushin.
- September 12 – Amendments are made to the May 17 Treaty of Arras, with further concessions to Spain by the Union of Arras. The final version is promulgated by King Philip of Spain in Mons, one of the regions in the Arras Union.
- September 28 – In Switzerland, a mutual assistance pact was signed at Lucerne between representatives of Roman Catholic cantons by the efforts of the Catholic Bishop of Basel, Jakob Christoph Blarer von Wartensee.

==== October–December ====
- October 5 – At Banda Aceh, on the island of Sumatra in what is now Indonesia, Alauddin Mansur Syah becomes the new Sultan of Aceh upon the death of Sultan Zainul Abidin.
- October 11 – Sokollu Mehmed Pasha, Grand Vizier of the Ottoman Empire for more than 14 years, is assassinated in Constantinople.
- October 13 – Semiz Ahmed Pasha is appointed as the new Ottoman Grand Vizier by Sultan Murad III.
- October 19 – King James VI of Scotland makes his ceremonial entry into Edinburgh to assume the throne at the age of 13, after being declared to have reached the age of majority. Scotland had been ruled by regents since 1567, when James was declared king.
- October 20 – Nicolò Doria is elected to a two-year term as the new Doge of the Republic of Genoa.

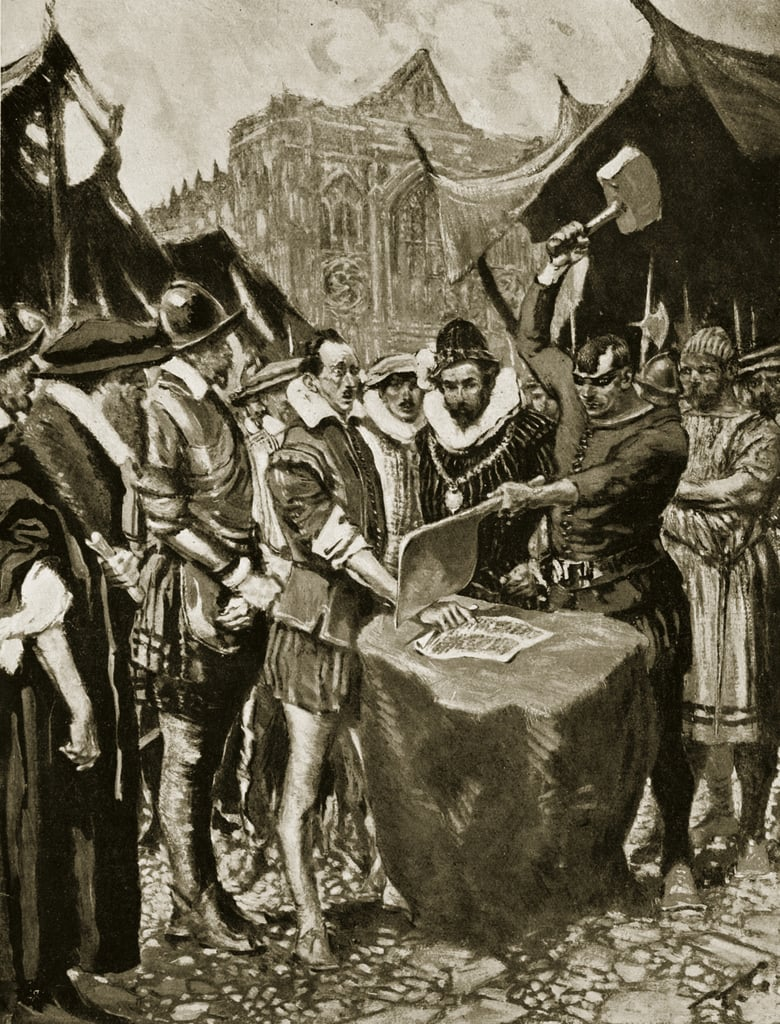
November 3: Seditious writer John Stubbs is barred from writing again

- November 3 – The English puritan John Stubbs, author of numerous pamphlets against the doctrines of the Church of England, is convicted of sedition, and his right hand is amputated as punishment.
- November 13 – During the Second Desmond Rebellion, rebel troops in Ireland, led by Gerald FitzGerald, 14th Earl of Desmond, carry out the Sack of Youghal and massacre the English Army garrison, then pillage and burn the homes of local residents.
- November 21 – Iancu Sasul becomes the new Prince of Moldavia as Peter the Lame steps down for the second time. Peter will replace Sasul on October 17, 1582.
- November 23 – Jeremias II Tranos is removed from office as Ecumenical Patriarch of Constantinople, leader of the Eastern Orthodox Church, and replaced by his rival Metrophanes III of Constantinople, whom he deposed on May 4, 1572.
- December 16 – After Willem van Pamele, the Spanish Governor of Flanders, is forced to flee during the Dutch Revolt, the Duke of Parma orders Pamele and the Catholic members of the Council of Flanders to convene at Douai as the temporary Flemish capital.
- December 24 – German astronomer Michael Maestlin makes the first cataloging of the Pleiades cluster, recording 11 separate stars visible to the naked eye, with a detailed illustration and measurements.
- December 25 – In France, Protestant French troops under the command of Matthieu Merle, make a surprise attack on the Roman Catholic cathedral in the village of Mende during Mass, and kill 400 civilians.

==== Date unknown ====
- In the Mughal Empire in India, Akbar abolishes the jizya, the tax placed upon non-Muslim residents.
- Akbar issues a mazhar signed by the leading ulamas, putting himself as the highest religious authority, allowing him to interpret the Quran.
- The municipality of Boac in Marinduque, Philippines is founded.
- The Bible of Kralice begins publication. The first complete translation of the Bible into the Czech language (with notes), it is prepared by the Unity of the Brethren, and published at Kralice nad Oslavou, Bohemia.

== Births ==
1570

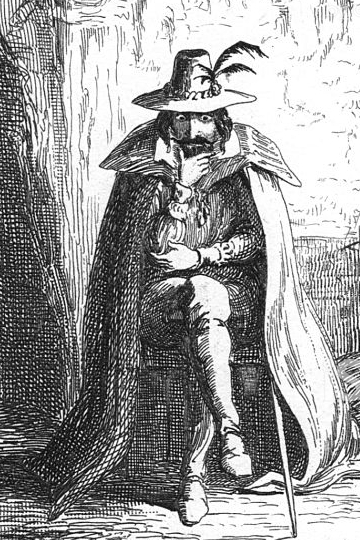
Guy Fawkes

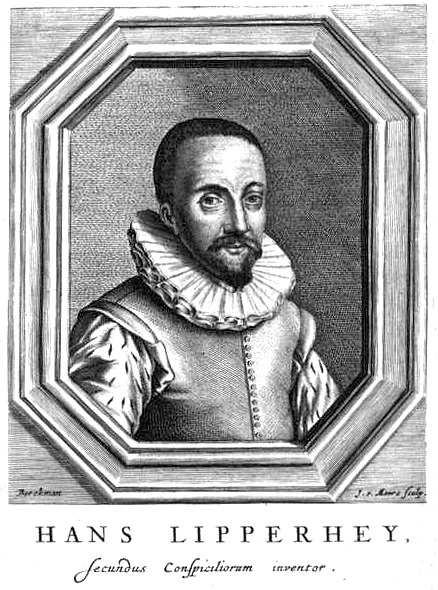
Hans Lippershey

- January 1 – Dorothea of Brunswick-Lüneburg, Spouse of Charles I, Count Palatine of Zweibrücken-Birkenfeld (d. 1649)
- January 19 – Wolfgang Hirschbach, German legal scholar (d. 1620)
- March 25 – Henry Lennard, 12th Baron Dacre, English baron and politician (d. 1616)
- April 13 – Guy Fawkes, English conspirator (d. 1606)
- May 8 – Tamás Esterházy, Hungarian writer (d. 1616)
- May 22 – Johann II, Duke of Saxe-Weimar, German duke (d. 1605)
- June 7 – Sultan Murad Mirza, Mughal prince (d. 1599)
- June 13 – Paul Peuerl, German organist (d. 1625)
- August 10 – Philip, Duke of Holstein-Gottorp (1587–1590) (d. 1590)
- August 19 – Salamone Rossi, Italian violinist and composer (d. 1630)
- August 21 – Christopher, Duke of Brunswick-Harburg, co-ruler of Brunswick-Lüneburg-Harburg (1603–1606) (d. 1606)
- August 22 – Franz von Dietrichstein, German Catholic bishop (d. 1636)
- August 31 – Gustav of Saxe-Lauenburg, German noble (d. 1597)
- October 3 – George Coke, British bishop (d. 1646)
- October 4 – Péter Pázmány, Hungarian cardinal and statesman (d. 1637)
- October 7 – Volkert Overlander, Dutch mayor (d. 1630)
- November 1 – Phineas Pett, English shipwright and member of the Pett Dynasty (d. 1647)
- November 15 – Francesco Curradi, Italian painter (d. 1661)
- November 20 – Giovanni Battista Agucchi, Italian churchman, papal diplomat, and writer on art theory (d. 1632)
- November 26 – Christian, Duke of Schleswig-Holstein-Sonderburg-Ærø (1622–1633) (d. 1633)
- November 28 – James Whitelocke, English judge (d. 1632)
- December 7 – Richard Cecil, English politician (d. 1633)
- December 29 – Wilhelm Lamormaini, Luxembourgian theologian (d. 1648)
- date unknown
  - Diego Aduarte, Prior of Manila (d. 1637)
  - Robert Aytoun, Scottish poet (d. 1638)
  - Ebba Bielke, Swedish baroness and conspirator (d. 1618)
  - John Cooper, English composer and lutenist (d. 1626)
  - Simon Grahame, Scottish-born adventurer (d. 1614)
  - Nakagawa Hidenari, Japanese daimyō (d. 1612)
  - Hans Lippershey, Dutch lensmaker (d. 1619)
  - Asprilio Pacelli, Italian Baroque composer (d. 1623)
  - Girolamo Rainaldi, Italian architect (d. 1655)
  - Claudia Sessa, Italian composer (d. 1617/19)
  - Katharina Henot, German General Postmaster and alleged witch (d. 1627)
  - Urszula Meyerin, politically influential Polish courtier (d. 1635)
  - Christina Rauscher, German official and critic of witchcraft persecutions (d. 1618)
  - John Dackombe, Chancellor of the Duchy of Lancaster (d. 1618)

1571

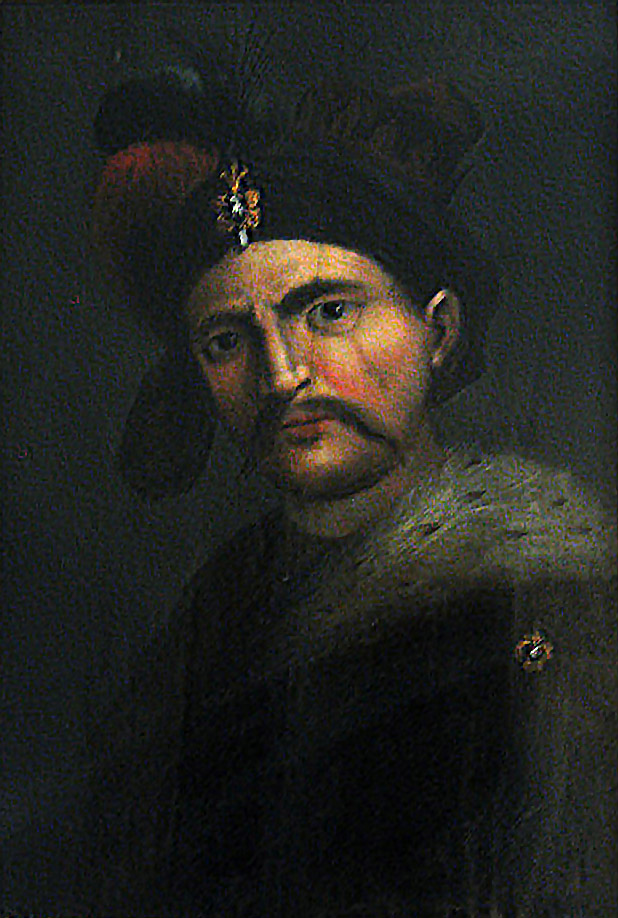
Abbas I of Safavid

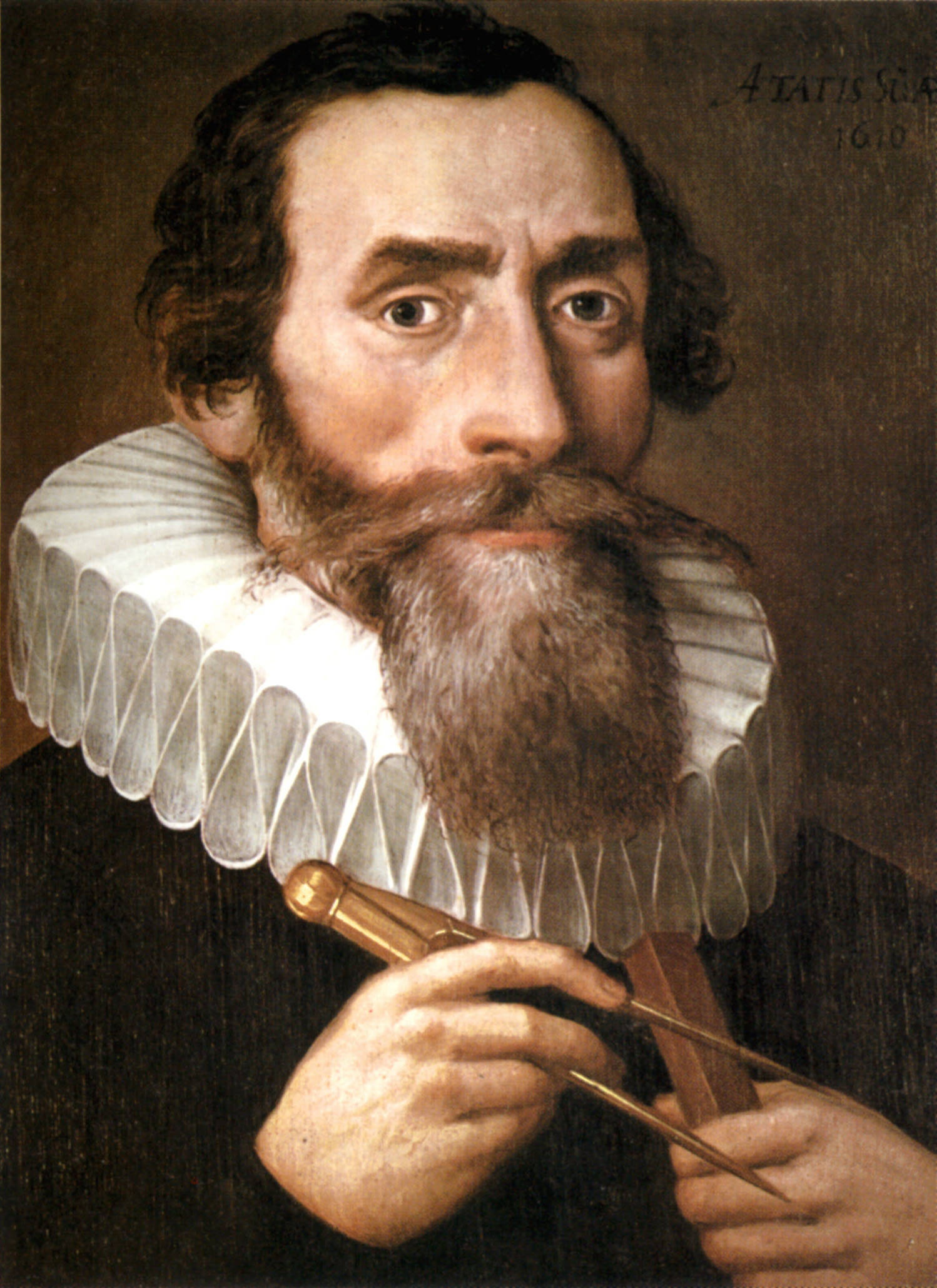
Johannes Kepler

- January 9 – Charles Bonaventure de Longueval, Count of Bucquoy, French soldier in Habsburg service (d. 1621)
- January 27 – Abbas I of Safavid, Shah of Iran (d. 1629)
- February 15 – Michael Praetorius, German composer and writer on music (d. 1621)
- March 31 – Pietro Aldobrandini, Italian cardinal, archbishop (d. 1621)
- April 17 – Adam Contzen, German economist (d. 1635)
- April 22 – Giovanni Branca, Italian architect and engineer (d. 1645)
- April 24 – Sur Singh, Ruler of Marwar (d. 1619)
- May 11 – Niwa Nagashige, Japanese warlord (d. 1637)
- June 17 – Thomas Mun, English writer on economics (d. 1641)
- July 16 – Theodoor Galle, Flemish engraver (d. 1633)
- August 2 – Charles, Duke of Guise, son of Henry I (d. 1640)
- August 14 – Anders Bure, founder of Swedish cartography (d. 1646)
- September 12 – Álvaro de Bazán, 2nd Marquis of Santa Cruz (d. 1646)
- September 21 – Giovanni Battista Magnani, Italian architect (d. 1653)
- September 29 – Caravaggio, Venetian artist (d. 1610)
- October 7
  - Anton Henry, Count of Schwarzburg-Sondershausen from 1586 (d. 1638)
  - Maria, Abbess of Quedlinburg, German abbess (d. 1610)
- October 15 – Jacob Matham, Dutch artist (d. 1631)
- October 18 – Wolfgang Ratke, German educational reformer (d. 1635)
- November 18 – Hippolytus Guarinonius, Italian physician and polymath (d. 1654)
- December 3 – Lakshmi Kumara Thathachariar, Indian saint (d. 1643)
- December 4 – Ferdinand, Prince of Asturias, Spanish prince (d. 1578)
- December 9 – Metius, Dutch mathematician and astronomer (d. 1635)
- December 20
  - Giles de Coninck, Flemish Jesuit theologian (d. 1633)
  - Scévole de Sainte-Marthe, French historian (d. 1650)
- December 27 – Johannes Kepler, German astronomer (d. 1630)
- December 31 – Emperor Go-Yōzei of Japan (d. 1617)
- date unknown
  - Henry Ainsworth, English Nonconformist clergyman and scholar (d. 1622)
  - William Bedell, Anglican churchman (d. 1642)
  - Willem Blaeu, Dutch cartographer (d. 1638)
  - Charles Butler, English beekeeper and philologist (d. 1647)
  - Inés de Hinojosa, Venezuelan hacendada (b. 1540)
  - Frederick de Houtman, Dutch explorer (d. 1627)
  - Esther Inglis, French (?British-born) calligrapher (d. 1624)
  - Lucrezia Marinella, Italian poet and author (d. 1653)
  - Paulus Moreelse, Dutch painter (d. 1638)
  - Hugh Roe O'Donnell, Irish chieftain and rebel (d. 1603)
  - Aleksander Ostrogski, Polish nobleman (d. 1603)
  - Alessandro Peretti di Montalto, Venetian cardinal (d. 1623)
  - Thomas Storer, English poet (d. 1604)
  - Thomas Wintour, English Gunpowder Plot conspirator (d. 1606)

1572

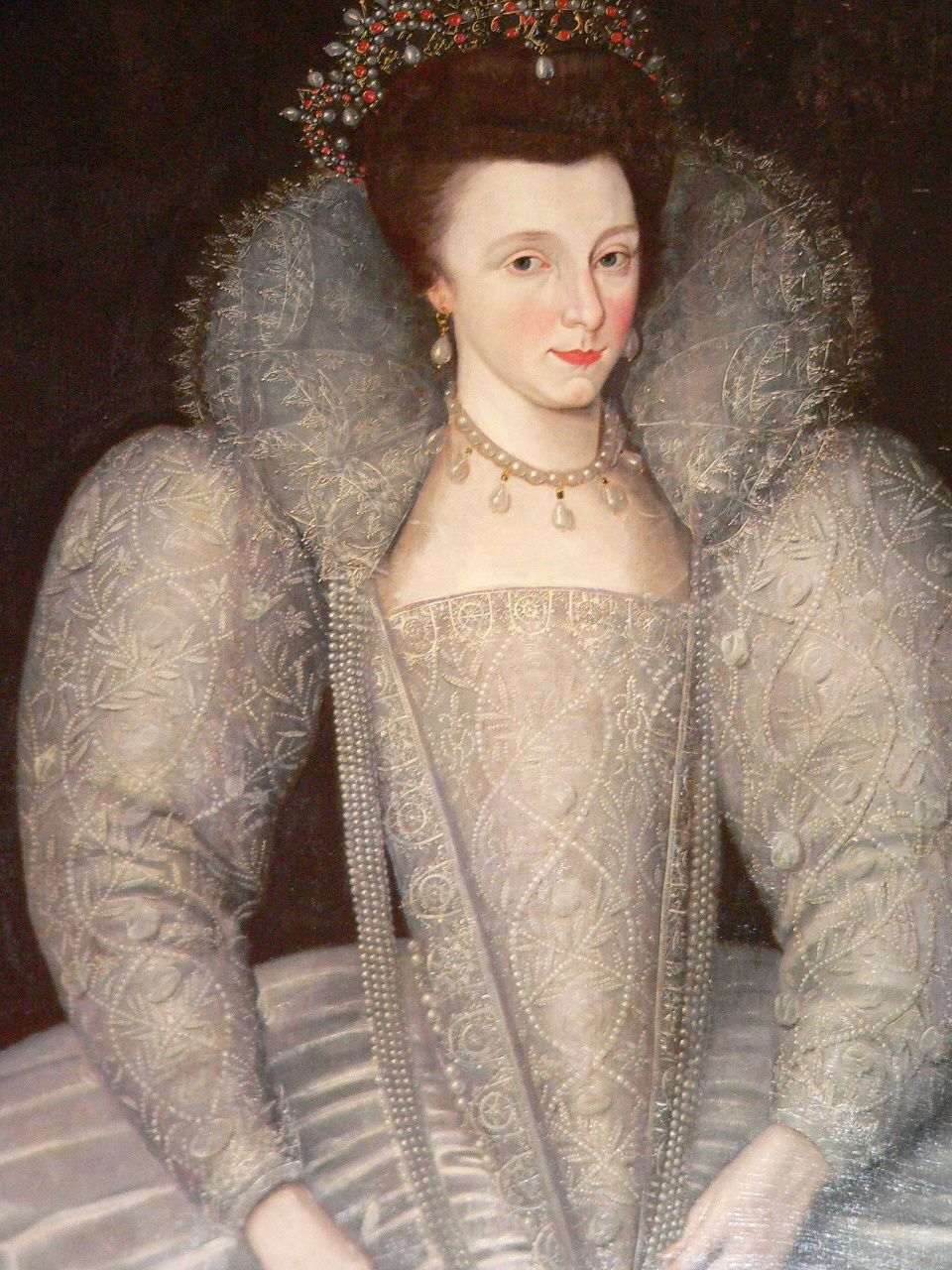
Elizabeth Wriothesley, Countess of Southampton

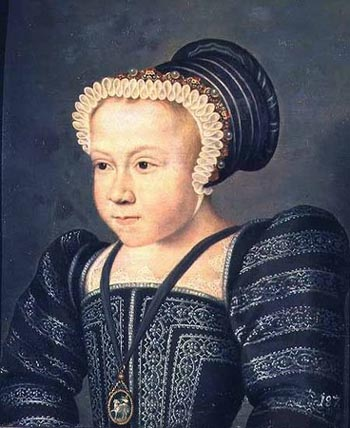
Marie Elisabeth of France

- January 7 – Antoine de Gaudier, French Jesuit writer (d. 1622)
- January 11 – Elizabeth Wriothesley, Countess of Southampton, English countess (d. 1655)
- January 22 – John Donne, English poet and soldier (d. 1631),
- February 1 – Ellen Marsvin, Danish noble, landowner and county administrator (d. 1649)
- February 14 – William Cooke, English politician (d. 1619)
- February 27 – Francis II, Duke of Lorraine (d. 1632)
- February 29 – Edward Cecil, 1st Viscount Wimbledon, English viscount (d. 1638)
- March 4 – István Esterházy, Hungarian noble (d. 1596)
- March 10 – Tommaso Caracciolo, Field Marshal of Spanish forces in the Thirty Years' War (d. 1631)
- March 20 – Otto III, Duke of Brunswick-Harburg (d. 1641)
- April 4 – William Strachey, English writer (d. 1621)
- April 14 – Adam Tanner, Austrian Jesuit professor of mathematics and philosophy (d. 1632)
- May 20 – John Davenant, English Anglican bishop (d. 1641)
- May 25 – Maurice, Landgrave of Hesse-Kassel, German musician (d. 1632)
- June 8 – Honorat de Porchères Laugier, French writer (d. 1653)
- June 10 – Henry II, Count of Reuss-Gera, Lord of Gera, Lobenstein and Oberkranichfeld (1572–1635) (d. 1635)
- June 11 – Ben Jonson, English dramatist (d. 1637)
- July 16 – Teimuraz I, Prince of Mukhrani, Georgian prince (d. 1625)
- July 25 – Theodorus Schrevelius, Dutch Golden Age writer and poet (d. 1649)
- August 6 – Fakhr-al-Din II, Ottoman Emir of Chouf (d. 1635)
- September 11 – Daniyal, Imperial Prince of the Royal House of Timur, Viceroy of Deccan (d. 1604)
- September 27 – Francis van Aarssens, Dutch diplomat (d. 1641)
- September 30 – Denis-Simon de Marquemont, French cardinal and archbishop (d. 1626)
- October 27 – Marie Elisabeth of France, French princess (d. 1578)
- November 4 – William Whitmore, English politician (d. 1648)
- November 7 – Johannes Saeckma, Dutch Golden Age magistrate and judge of Leeuwarden (d. 1636)
- November 8 – John Sigismund, Elector of Brandenburg (d. 1619)
- November 23 – Albret Skeel, State Admiral of Denmark (d. 1639)
- November 25 – Daniel Sennert, German physician, chemist (d. 1637)
- December 1 – Vilem Slavata of Chlum, Czech nobleman (d. 1652)
- December 20 – Edward Russell, 3rd Earl of Bedford, son of Sir Francis Russell (d. 1627)
- December 22 – Juan López de Agurto de la Mata, Spanish Catholic prelate who served as Bishop of Coro (later Bishop of Caracas) (1634–1637) and Bishop of Puerto Rico (1630–1634) (d. 1637)
- December 27 – Johannes Vodnianus Campanus, Czech humanist, composer, pedagogue, poet and dramatist (d. 1622)
- date unknown
  - Johann Bayer, German astronomer (d. 1625)
  - Alfonso de la Cueva, 1st Marquis of Bedmar, Spanish diplomat (d. 1655)
  - Arend Dickmann, Dutch admiral in the Polish Navy (d. 1627)
  - John Floyd, English Jesuit (d. 1649)
  - Regina Basilier, German-Swedish merchant banker (d. 1631)
  - Bartholomew Gosnold, English lawyer and explorer (d. 1607)
  - Cyril Lucaris, Greek prelate and theologian (d. 1637)
  - James Mabbe, English scholar and poet (d. 1642)
  - Thomas Tomkins, Welsh composer (d. 1656)
- probable – Giovanni Bernardino Azzolini or Mazzolini or Asoleni, Italian painter (d. c.1645)

1573

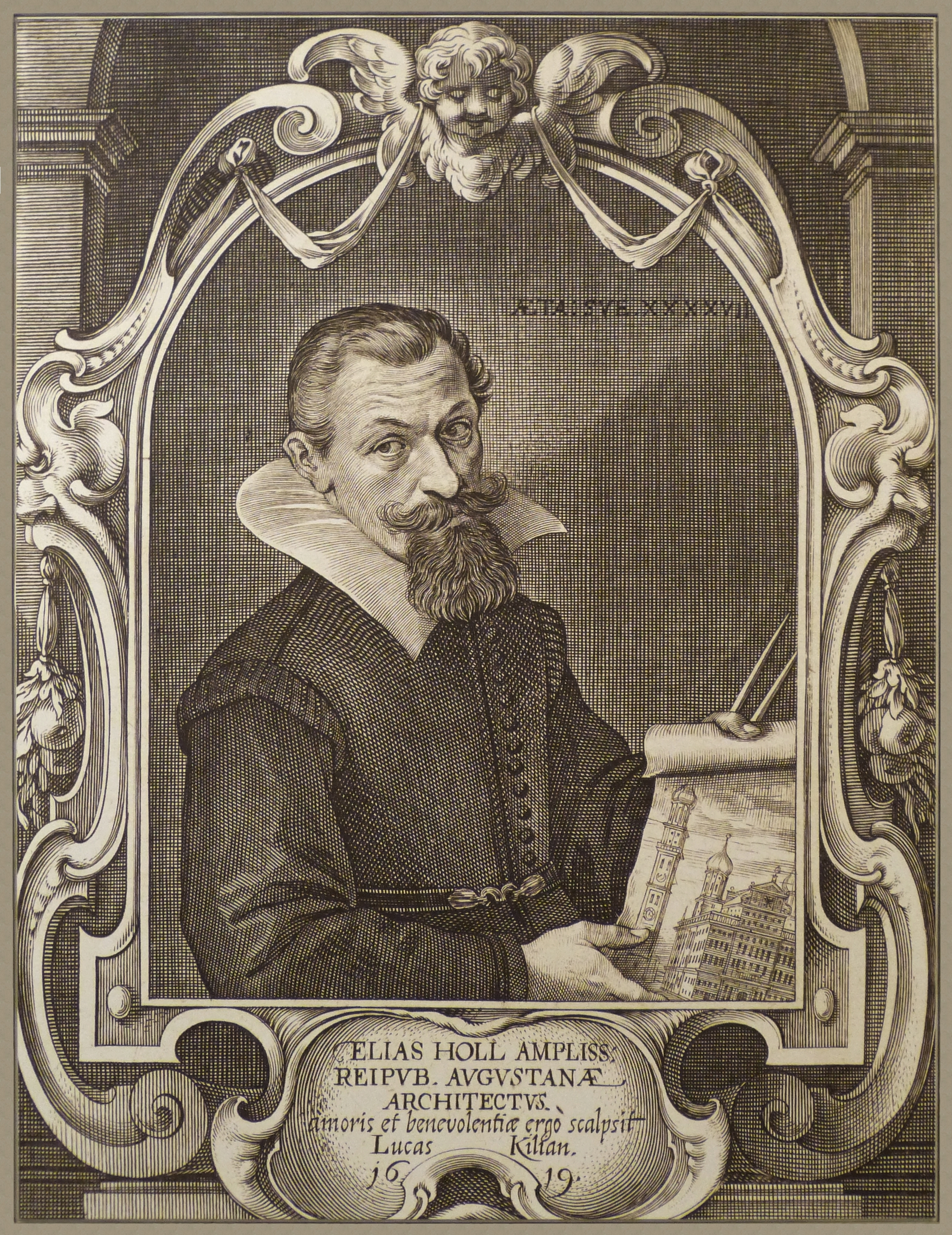
Elias Holl

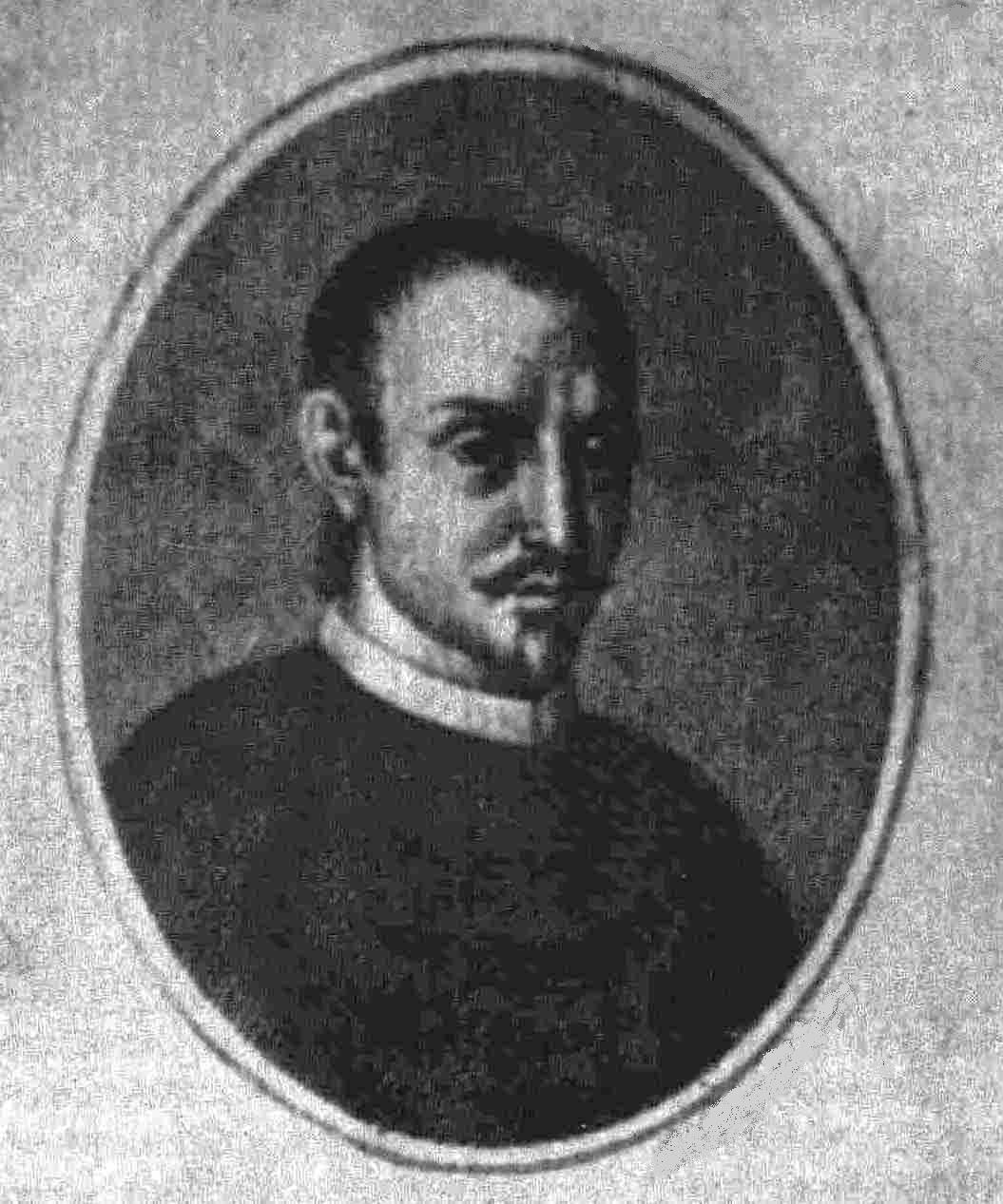
Pietro Carrera

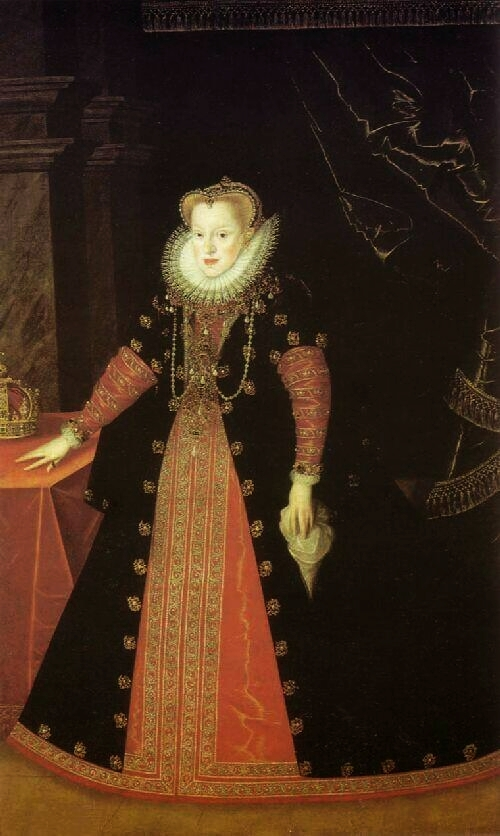
Anne of Austria, Queen of Poland

- January 10 – Simon Marius, German astronomer (d. 1624)
- January 18 – Ambrosius Bosschaert, still life painter of the Dutch Golden Age (d. 1621)
- January 20 – Alexander, Duke of Schleswig-Holstein-Sonderburg (d. 1627)
- January 22 – Ludwig Camerarius, German politician (d. 1651)
- January 30 – Georg Friedrich, Margrave of Baden-Durlach (1604–1622) (d. 1638)
- February 28 – Elias Holl, German architect (d. 1646)
- March 12 – Agnes Hedwig of Anhalt, Abbess of Gernrode, Electress of Saxony, Duchess of Schleswig-Holstein-Sønderborg-Plön (d. 1616)
- March 24 – Giovanni Doria, Spanish noble (d. 1642)
- April 6 – Margaret of Brunswick-Lüneburg, German noble (d. 1643)
- April 12 – Jacques Bonfrère, Flemish Jesuit priest, biblical scholar (d. 1642)
- April 13 – Christina of Holstein-Gottorp, Queen of Sweden (d. 1625)
- April 17 – Maximilian I, Elector of Bavaria (d. 1651)
- April 28 – Charles de Valois, Duke of Angoulême, natural son of Charles IX of France (d. 1650)
- May 12 – Henri, Duke of Montpensier, French noble (d. 1608)
- May 13 – Taj Bibi Bilqis Makani, Mughal empress (d. 1619)
- June 12 – Robert Radclyffe, 5th Earl of Sussex, British Earl (d. 1629)
- June 16 – Andries de Witt, Grand Pensionary of Holland (d. 1637)
- June 28 – Henry Danvers, 1st Earl of Danby, English noble (d. 1643)
- July 12 – Pietro Carrera, Italian priest, painter and saint (d. 1647)
- July 14 – Bonaventure Hepburn, Scottish philologist and Minim friar (d. 1620)
- July 15 – Inigo Jones, English architect (d. 1652)
- July 18 – Odoardo Fialetti, Italian painter (d. 1638)
- July 25 – Christoph Scheiner, German astronomer and Jesuit (d. 1650)
- July 29 – Philip II, Duke of Pomerania-Stettin (d. 1618)
- August 16 – Anne of Austria, Queen of Poland (d. 1598)
- August 25 – Elizabeth of Denmark, Duchess of Brunswick-Wolfenbüttel, German regent (d. 1626)
- September 8 – Georg Friedrich von Greiffenklau, Archbishop of Mainz (d. 1629)
- September 28 – Théodore de Mayerne, Swiss physician (d. 1654)
- September 29 – Robert Payne, English politician (d. 1631)
- October 6 – Henry Wriothesley, 3rd Earl of Southampton (d. 1624)
- October 7 – William Laud, Archbishop of Canterbury (d. 1645)
- October 11 – Jacobus Boonen, Dutch Catholic archbishop (d. 1655)
- November 3 – Catherine of Lorraine, Abbess of Remiremont (d. 1648)
- November 29 – Johannes Canuti Lenaeus, archbishop of Uppsala (d. 1669)
- November 30 – Aubert Miraeus, Belgian historian (d. 1640)
- December 7 – Odoardo Farnese, Italian Catholic cardinal (d. 1626)
- December 21 – Mathurin Régnier, French satirist (d. 1613)
- December 22 – Ernest Casimir I, Count of Nassau-Dietz (1606–1632) and Stadtholder of Groningen, Friesland and Drenthe (1625–1632) (d. 1632)
- December 23 – Giovanni Battista Crespi, Italian painter (d. 1632)
- date unknown
  - Gabrielle d'Estrées, French royal mistress (d. 1599)
  - Richard Johnson, English romance writer (d. 1659)
  - Johannes Junius, Burgomeister of Bamberg (d. 1628)
  - Oeyo, wife of Tokugawa Hidetada (d. 1626)
  - Sigismund Báthory, Prince of Transylvania and of the Holy Roman Empire (d. 1613)
- approximate year
  - June – Joan Pau Pujol, Catalan composer and organist (d. 1626)

1574

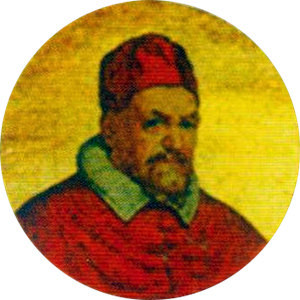
Pope Innocent X

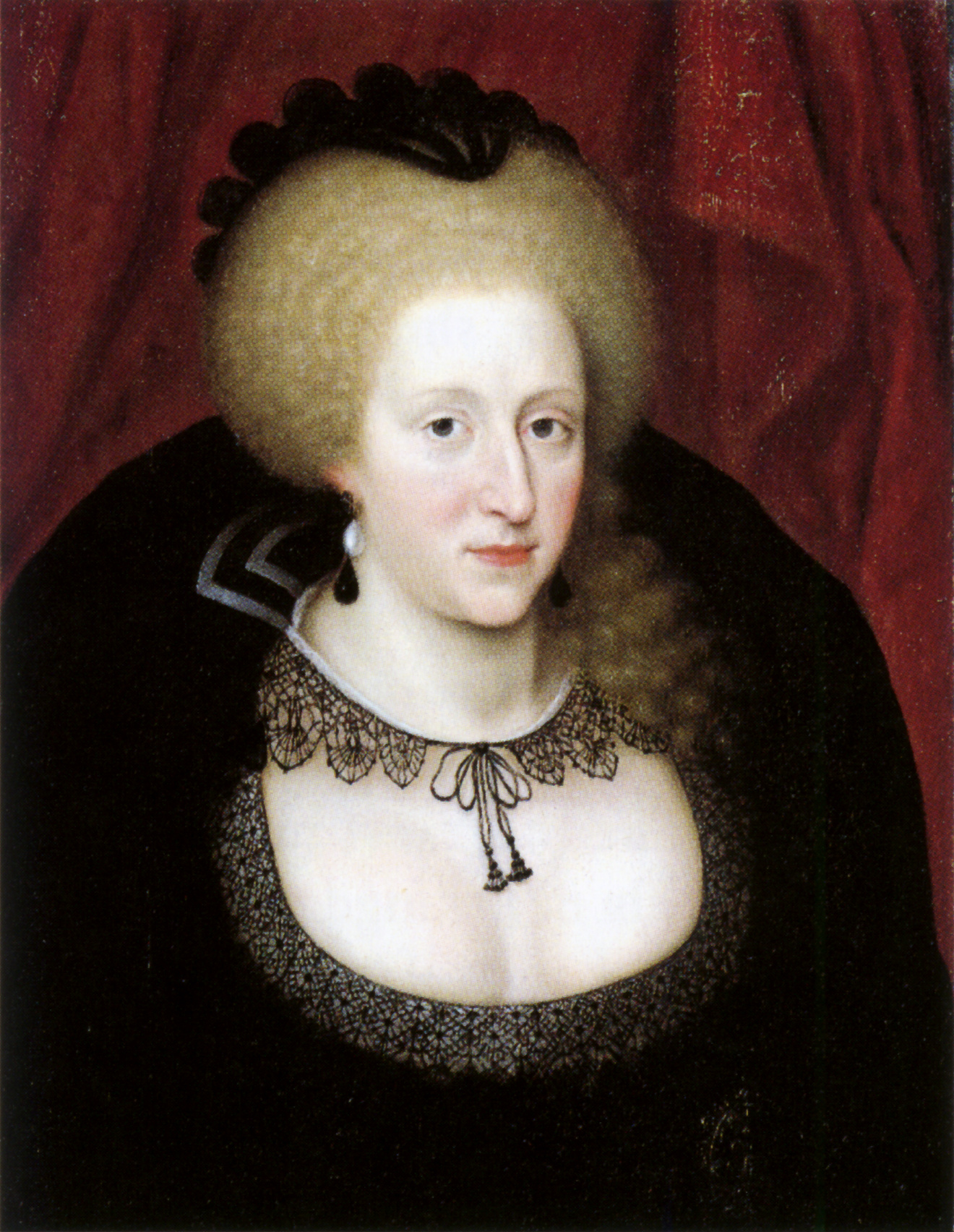
Anne of Denmark

- January 17 – Robert Fludd, English Rosicrucian and Paracelsian physicist (d. 1637)
- February 17 – Pedro Téllez-Girón, 3rd Duke of Osuna, Spanish nobleman and politician (d. 1624)
- March 4 – Carl Gyllenhielm, Swedish soldier and politician (d. 1650)
- March 5 – William Oughtred, English mathematician and Anglican minister (d. 1660)
- March 7 – John Wilbye, English composer (date of baptism) (d. 1638)
- April 27 – Philip Rubens, Flemish lawyer and older brother to painter Peter Paul Rubens (d. 1611)
- May 6 – Pope Innocent X (d. 1655)
- May 14
  - Daniel Dumonstier, French artist (d. 1646)
  - Francesco Rasi, Italian composer, singer, instrumentalist, poet (d. 1621)
- June 13 – Juan Alonso de Solis y Mendoza, Spanish Catholic prelate, Bishop of Puerto Rico (1635–1640) (d. 1640)
- June 13 – Wilhelm Kettler, Duke of Courland (d. 1640)
- June – Richard Barnfield, English poet (d. 1627)
- July 1 – Joseph Hall, English bishop and satirist (d. 1656)
- July 2 – Dorothea Maria of Anhalt, Duchess consort of Saxe-Weimar (1602–1605) (d. 1617)
- July 10 – Clara Maria of Pomerania-Barth, German noble (d. 1623)
- July 23 – Balthasar I Moretus, Flemish printer (d. 1641)
- August 2 – Sir Richard Beaumont, 1st Baronet, English politician (d. 1631)
- August 7 – Robert Dudley, styled Earl of Warwick, English explorer and geographer (d. 1649)
- August 28 – Frederick IV, Duke of Brunswick-Lüneburg (1636–1648) (d. 1648)
- August 30 – Albert Szenczi Molnár, Hungarian translator (d. 1634)
- September 6 – Luis Sotelo, Spanish Franciscan friar who died as a martyr in Japan (d. 1624)
- September 18 – Claudio Achillini, Italian philosopher, theologian, mathematician, poet, jurist (d. 1640)
- September 29 – Ludovic Stewart, 2nd Duke of Lennox, Scottish nobleman and politician (d. 1624)
- September – Thomas Gataker, English clergyman and theologian (d. 1654)
- October 25 – François de Sourdis, French Catholic cardinal (d. 1628)
- November 4 – Erycius Puteanus, Dutch humanist, philologist (d. 1646)
- November 5 – Charlotte de La Marck, French duchess (d. 1594)
- November 10 – Archduchess Maria Christina of Austria, Austrian archduchess (d. 1621)
- November 30 – Frederick of Solms-Rödelheim, imperial chamberlain, war and Obrist (d. 1649)
- December 8 – Maria Anna of Bavaria, Archduchess of Inner Austria (d. 1616)
- December 10 – Mikołaj Łęczycki, Polish Jesuit (d. 1653)
- December 12
  - Adam Wenceslaus, Duke of Cieszyn (d. 1617)
  - Anne of Denmark, queen of James VI of Scotland (d. 1619)
- December 15 – Samuel Besler, Polish composer (d. 1625)
- date unknown
  - John Day, English dramatist (d. 1640)
  - Wilhelm Kinsky, Bohemian nobleman (d. 1634)
  - Claudio Pari, Sicilian composer
  - Feng Menglong, Chinese poet (d. 1645)

1575

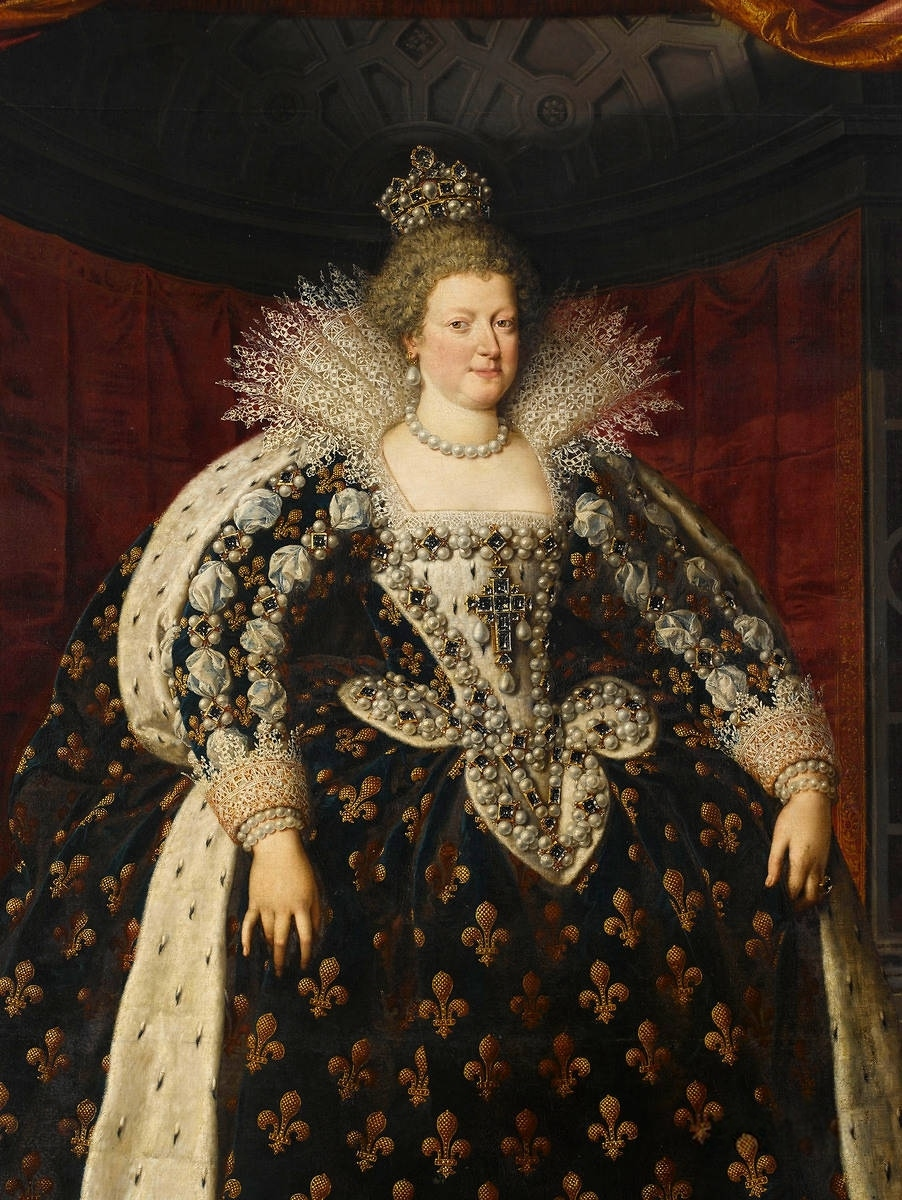
Marie de' Medici

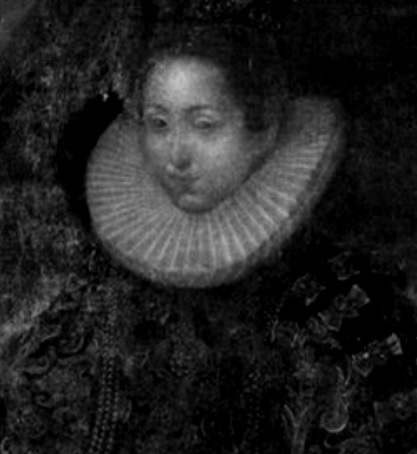
Countess Palatine Anna Maria of Neuburg

- January – Elizabeth Cecil, 16th Baroness de Ros (d. 1591)
- January 22 – Louis III, Cardinal of Guise (d. 1621)
- c. February 3 – Bernard of Wąbrzeźno, Polish Catholic priest and Benedictine monk (d. 1603)
- February 4 – Pierre de Bérulle, French cardinal and statesman (d. 1629)
- February 15 – Louis Gunther of Nassau, Count of Nassau-Katzenelnbogen (d. 1604)
- February 16 – Richard Carpenter, English priest and theologian (d. 1625)
- February 21 – Marten Pepijn, Flemish painter (d. 1643)
- February 27
  - John Adolf, Duke of Holstein-Gottorp (1590–1616) (d. 1616)
  - Anna of Holstein-Gottorp, countess consort of East Frisia (d. 1610)
- April 18 – Frederick Magnus, Count of Erbach-Fürstenau (1606–1618) (d. 1618)
- April 21 – Francesco Molin, Doge of Venice (d. 1655)
- April 26 – Marie de' Medici, queen of Henry IV of France (d. 1642)
- May 20 – Robert Heath, English judge and politician (d. 1649)
- May 30 – Diego Salcedo, Spanish bishop (d. 1644)
- June 15 – Lelio Biscia, Italian Catholic cardinal (d. 1638)
- June 24 – William Petre, 2nd Baron Petre, English peer and MP (d. 1637)
- June 26 – Anne Catherine of Brandenburg (d. 1612)
- July 2 – Elizabeth de Vere, Countess of Derby (d. 1627)
- July 11 – Thomas Berkeley, English politician (d. 1611)
- July 14 – Augustus, Prince of Anhalt-Plötzkau, German prince (d. 1653)
- July 28 – Fernando de Valdés y Llanos, Spanish Catholic archbishop (d. 1639)
- July 31 – Simon Steward, English politician (d. 1632)
- August 14 – Robert Hayman, English-born poet (d. 1629)
- August 15 – Diego, Prince of Asturias, Portuguese prince (d. 1582)
- August 18 – Countess Palatine Anna Maria of Neuburg, Duchess of Saxe-Altenburg (d. 1643)
- August 24 – William Burton, British antiquarian (d. 1645)
- November 4 – Guido Reni, Italian painter (d. 1642)
- November 26 – John Augustus, Count Palatine of Lützelstein, German count (d. 1611)
- December 4 – The Nun of Monza, Italian nun (d. 1650)
- December 18 – Michelagnolo Galilei, Italian lutenist and composer (d. 1631)
- date unknown
  - Jakob Böhme, German mystic (d. 1624)
  - David Calderwood, Scottish divine and historian (d. 1650)
  - Concino Concini, 3rd Prime Minister of France (d. 1617)
  - Anna Kostka, Polish noblewoman (d. 1635)
  - Lionel Cranfield, 1st Earl of Middlesex, successful London merchant (d. 1645)
  - William Parker, 4th Baron Monteagle (d. 1622)
  - Arbella Stuart, Duchess of Somerset (d. 1615)
  - Cyril Tourneur, English dramatist (d. 1626)
  - Rory O'Donnell, 1st Earl of Tyrconnell (d. 1608)
- probable
  - Vittoria Aleotti, Italian composer (d. c. 1620)
  - Giambattista Basile, Italian poet (d. 1632)
  - Edmund Bolton, English historian and poet (d. 1633)
  - Clemente Tabone, Maltese landowner and militia member (d. 1665)

1576

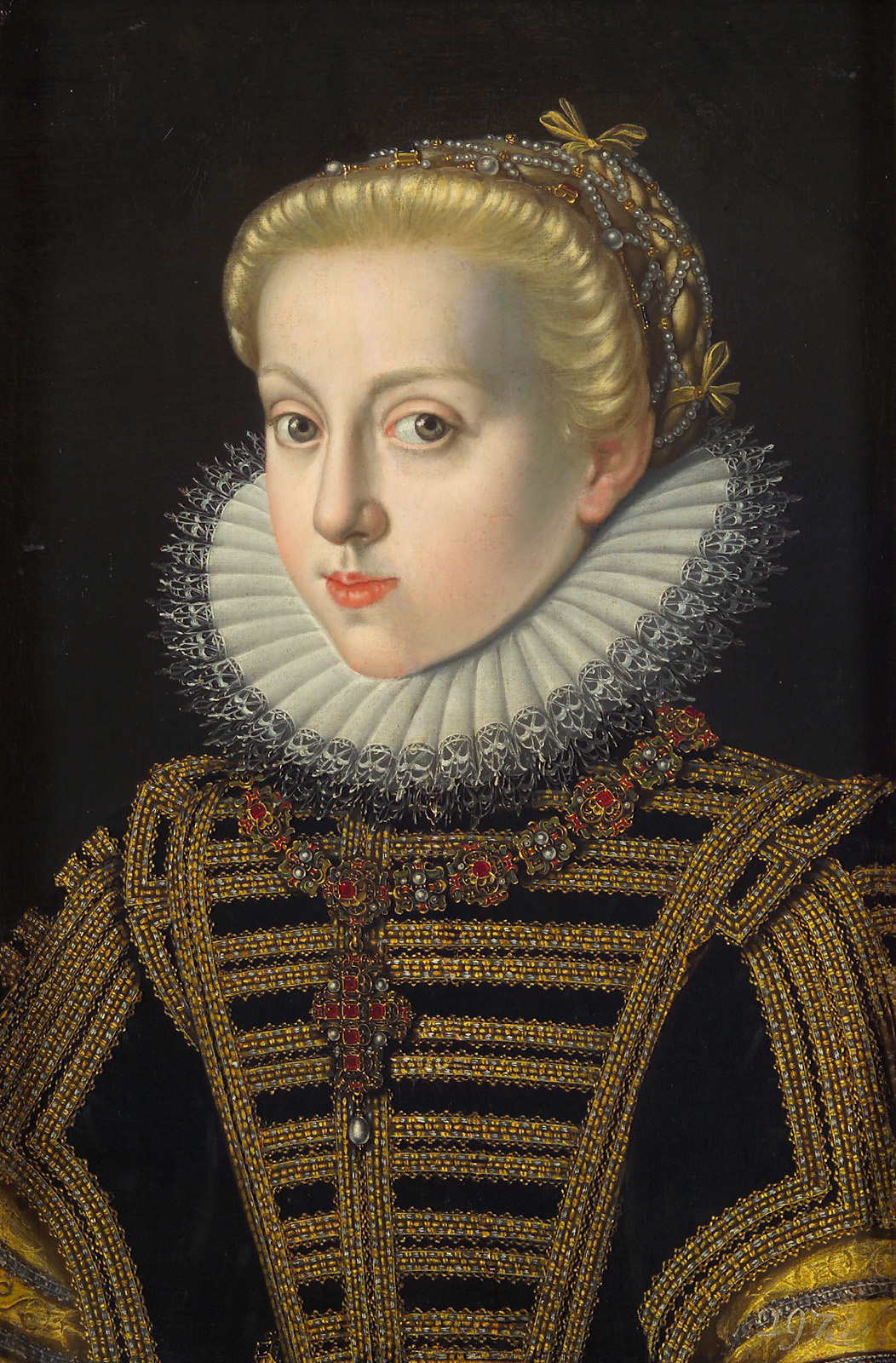
Archduchess Catherine Renata of Austria

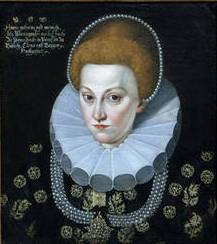
Duchess Anna of Prussia

- January 4 – Archduchess Catherine Renata of Austria, Austrian archduchess (d. 1599)
- January 5 – Anne Turner, English murderer (d. 1615)
- January 12 – Petrus Scriverius, Dutch writer and scholar on the history of Holland and Belgium (d. 1660)
- February 2 – Alix Le Clerc, French Canoness Regular and foundress (d. 1622)
- February 10 – Festus Hommius, Dutch theologian (d. 1642)
- February 29 – Antonio Neri, Italian chemist (d. 1614)
- March 14 – Eric of Lorraine, Bishop of Verdun (d. 1623)
- March 31 – Countess Louise Juliana of Nassau, countess consort and a regent of the Palatinate (d. 1644)
- May 17 – Joam Mattheus Adami, Italian Jesuit missionary (d. 1633)
- May 24 – Elizabeth Carey, Lady Berkeley, English courtier (d. 1635)
- May 27 – Caspar Schoppe, German controversialist and scholar (d. 1649)
- June 6 – Giovanni Diodati, Swiss-born Italian Calvinist theologian and translator (d. 1649)
- June 16 – Giovanni Battista Viola, Italian painter (d. 1622)
- July 3 – Duchess Anna of Prussia, Electress consort of Brandenburg and Duchess consort of Prussia (d. 1625)
- September 22 – Philipp of Bavaria, German Catholic cardinal (d. 1598)
- October – Thomas Weelkes, English composer and organist (d. 1626)
- October 6 – Roger Manners, 5th Earl of Rutland, eldest surviving son of John Manners (d. 1612)
- October 7 – John Marston, English writer (d. 1634)
- October 12 – Thomas Dudley, Governor of Massachusetts Bay Colony (d. 1653)
- October 28 – Rudolph, Prince of Anhalt-Zerbst, Prince of Anhalt (1586–1603), then Prince of Anhalt-Zerbst (1603–1621) (d. 1621)
- October 30 – Enrico Caterino Davila, Italian historian and diplomat (d. 1631)
- November 6 – Charles Günther, Count of Schwarzburg-Rudolstadt (1605–1630) (d. 1630)
- November 17 – Roque Gonzales, Paraguayan missionary (d. 1628)
- November 18 – Philipp Ludwig II, Count of Hanau-Münzenberg (1580–1612) (d. 1612)
- November 27 – Shimazu Tadatsune, Japanese ruler of Satsuma (d. 1638)
- December 20 – Saint John Sarkander, Moravian priest (d. 1620)
- date unknown
  - William Ames, English Protestant philosopher (d. 1633)
  - John Carver, first governor of Plymouth Colony (d. 1621)
  - Giulio Cesare la Galla, professor of philosophy at the Collegio Romano in Italy (d. 1624)
  - Santino Solari, Swiss architect and sculptor (d. 1646)
- probable – Jesper Mattson Cruus af Edeby, Swedish soldier and politician (d. 1622)

1577

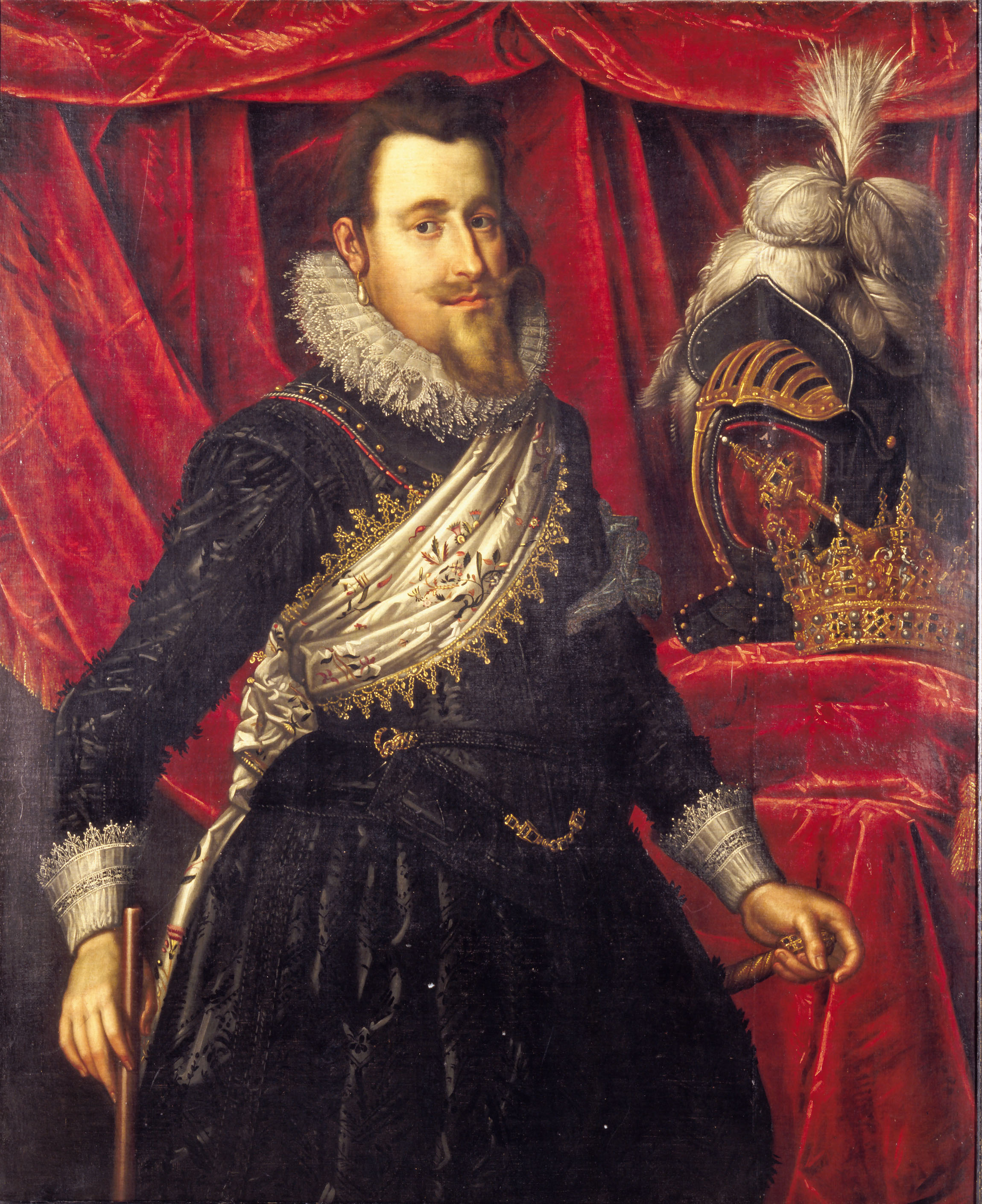
Christian IV of Denmark and Norway

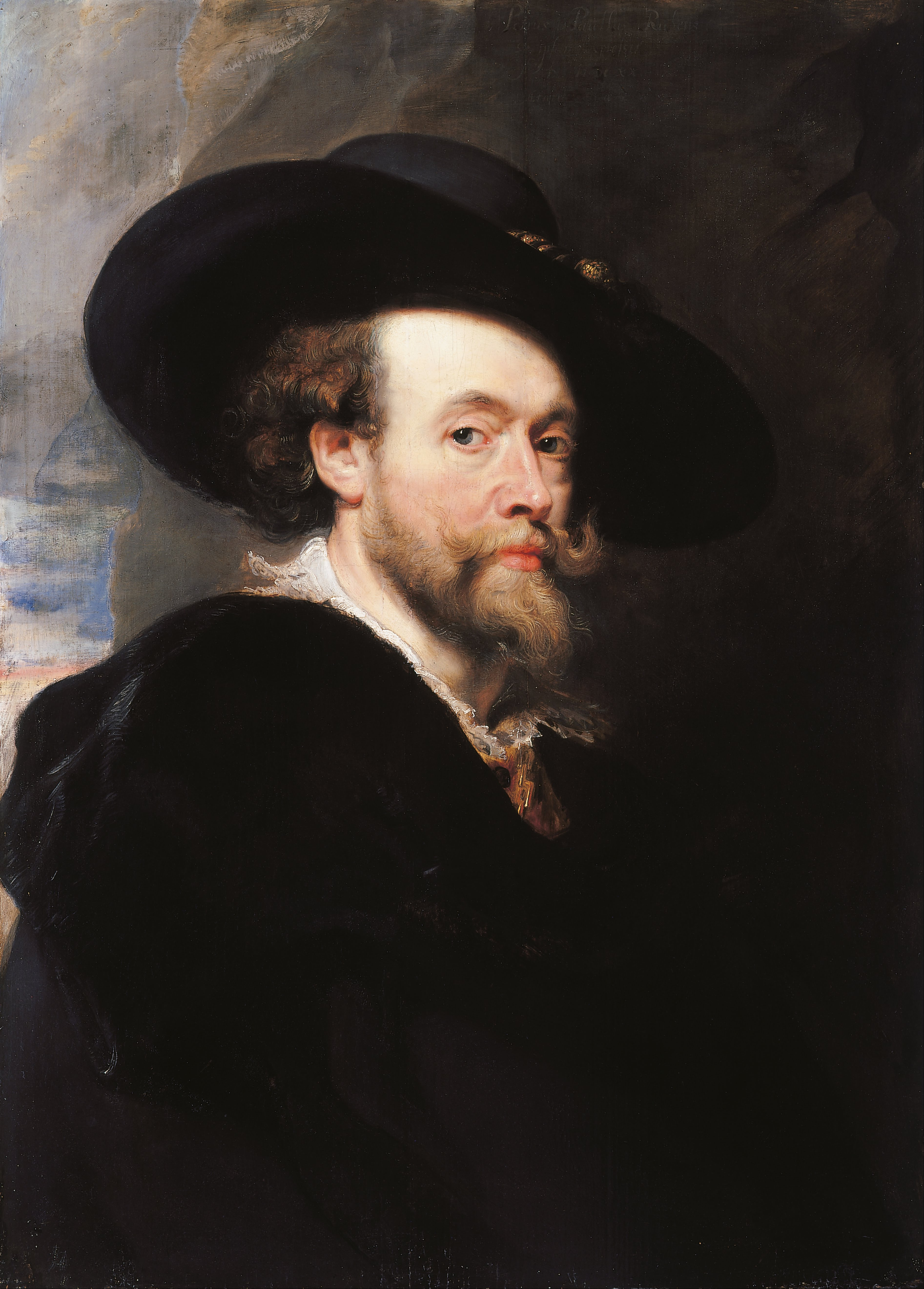
Peter Paul Rubens

- January 9 – Anthony Irby, English politician (d. 1610)
- January 12 – Francesco Stelluti, Italian mathematician (d. 1652)
- January 13 – Hugh Audley, English moneylender/lawyer/philosopher (d. 1662)
- February 5 – Johann Baptist Grossschedel, German noble, alchemist and esoteric author (d. 1630)
- February 6 – Beatrice Cenci, Italian noblewoman who conspired to kill her father (d. 1599)
- February 7 – Francis Walsingham, English Jesuit (d. 1647)
- February 8 – Robert Burton, English scholar at Oxford University (d. 1640)
- February 15 – Jean Riolan the Younger, French anatomist (d. 1657)
- February 17 – Augustus, Duke of Saxe-Lauenburg, German noble (d. 1656)
- February 18 – Roger North, English politician (d. 1651)
- February 22 – Pieter Huyssens, Flemish architect (d. 1637)
- March 1 – Richard Weston, 1st Earl of Portland (d. 1635)
- March 2 – George Sandys, English traveller (d. 1644)
- March 5 – Franciscus Dousa, Dutch classical scholar (d. 1630)
- March 20 – Alessandro Tiarini, Italian Baroque painter of the Bolognese School (d. 1668)
- March 24 – Francis, Duke of Pomerania-Stettin, Bishop of Cammin (d. 1620)
- April 12 – King Christian IV of Denmark and Norway (d. 1648)
- April 26 – Countess Elisabeth of Nassau, French noble (d. 1642)
- May 20 – Philip de' Medici, Italian noble (d. 1582)
- May 31 – Nur Jahan, empress consort of the Mughal Empire (d. 1645)
- June 12 – Paul Guldin, Swiss Jesuit mathematician (d. 1643)
- June 28 – Peter Paul Rubens, Flemish painter (d. 1640)
- July 9 – Thomas West, 3rd Baron De La Warr, English governor of Virginia (d. 1618)
- July 21
  - Anne de Montafié, Countess of Clermont-en-Beauvaisis, French countess (d. 1644)
  - Adam Willaerts, Dutch painter (d. 1664)
- August 11 (bapt.) – Barnaby Potter, English Bishop of Carlisle (d. 1642)
- September 1 – Scipione Borghese, Italian Catholic cardinal and art collector (d. 1633)
- September 8 – Otto Heurnius, Dutch physician and philosopher (d. 1652)
- September 24 – Louis V, Landgrave of Hesse-Darmstadt from 1596 to 1626 (d. 1626)
- October 3 – Tobie Matthew, English Member of Parliament, later Catholic priest (d. 1655)
- October 6 – Ferdinand of Bavaria (d. 1650)
- October 11 – Jørgen Lunge, Danish politician (d. 1619)
- October 17
  - Cristofano Allori, Italian portrait painter (d. 1621)
  - Dmitry Pozharsky, Russian prince (d. 1642)
- November 2 – John Bridgeman, British bishop (d. 1652)
- November 4 – François Leclerc du Tremblay (d. 1638)
- November 10 – Jacob Cats, Dutch poet, jurist and politician (d. 1660)
- November 24 – Louis Philip, Count Palatine of Guttenberg, Palatinate-Veldenz (d. 1601)
- November 25 – Piet Pieterszoon Hein, Dutch admiral and privateer for the Dutch Republic (d. 1629)
- December 8 – Mario Minniti, Italian artist active in Sicily after 1606 (d. 1640)
- December 20 – Antonio Brunelli, Italian composer and theorist (d. 1630)
- December 25 – Petrus Kirstenius, German physician and orientalist (d. 1640)
- December 27 – William Howard, 3rd Baron Howard of Effingham, English politician and Baron (d. 1615)
- date unknown
  - Christoph Besold, German jurist (d. 1638)
  - Giacomo Cavedone, Italian painter (d. 1660)
  - Robert Cushman, English Plymouth Colony settler (d. 1625)
  - Kobayakawa Hideaki, Japanese samurai and warlord (d. 1602)
  - William Noy, English lawyer and politician (d. 1634)
  - Samuel Purchas, English travel writer (d. 1626)
  - Meletius Smotrytsky, Ruthenian religious activist and author, who developed Church Slavonic grammar (d. 1633)
  - Gerhard Johann Vossius, German classical scholar and theologian (d. 1649)

1578

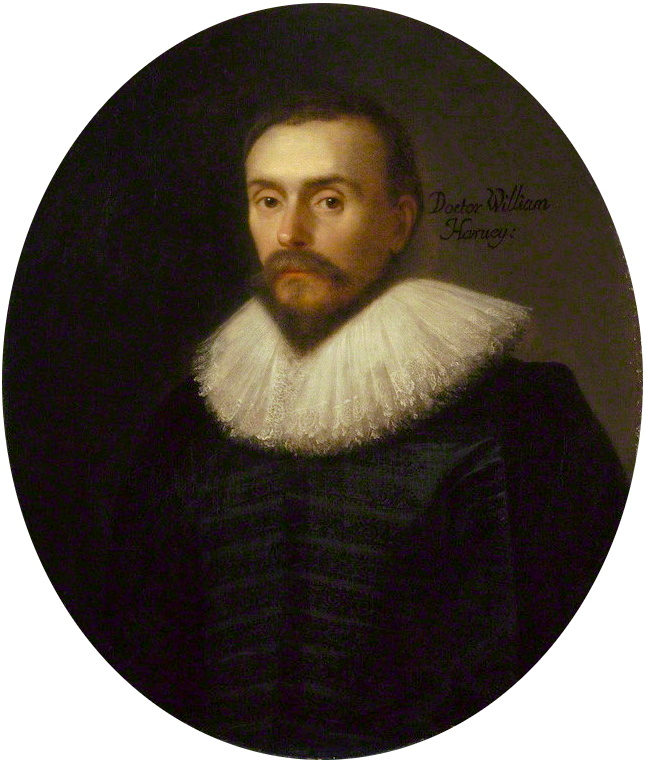
William Harvey

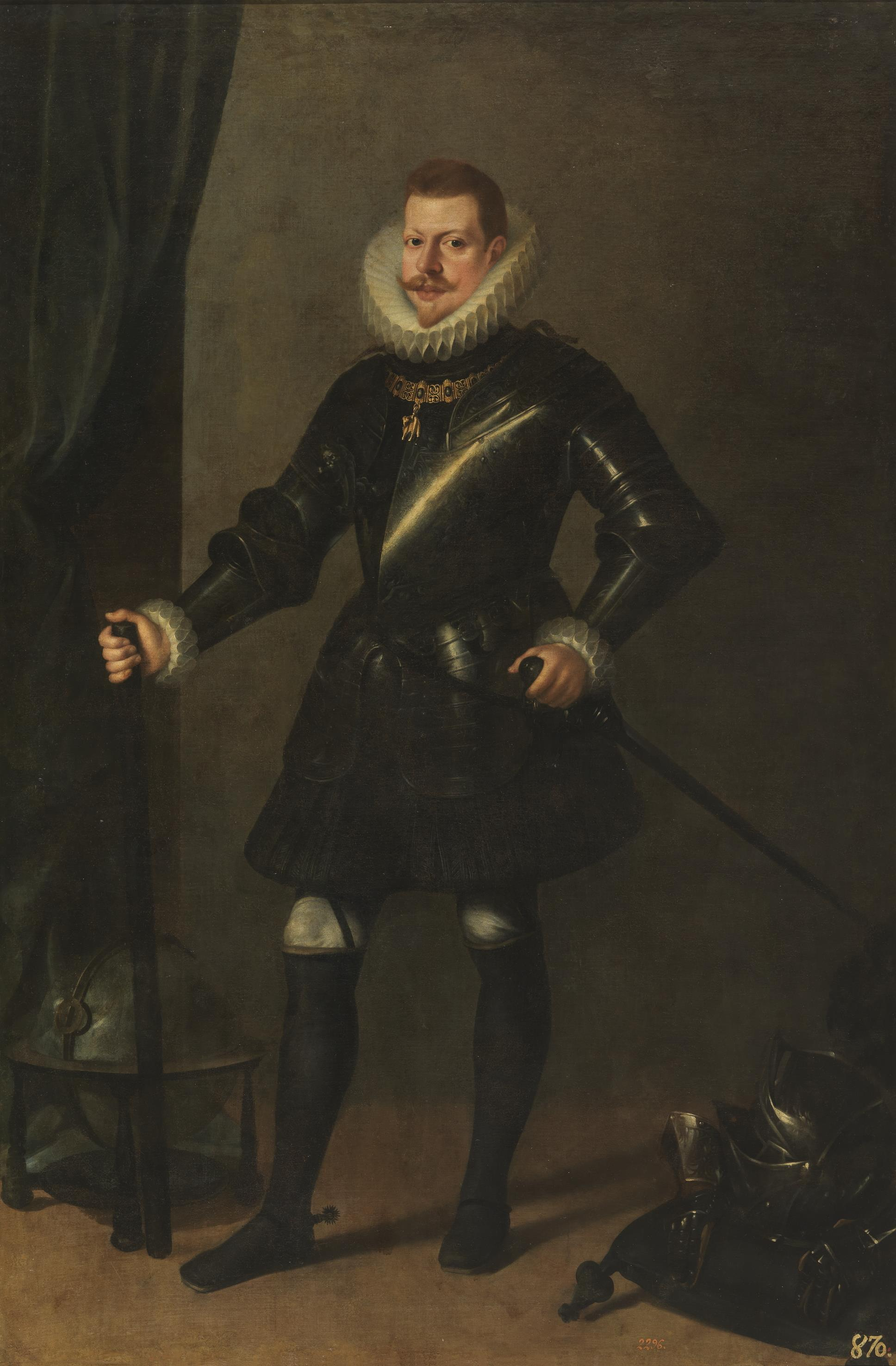
Philip III of Spain

- January 7 – Agnes of Solms-Laubach, Landgravine of Hesse-Kassel (d. 1602)
- January 10 – Christopher Clitherow, Lord Mayor of London and Member of Parliament (d. 1641)
- January 28 – Cornelius Haga, Dutch diplomat (d. 1654)
- March 18 – Adam Elsheimer, German artist working in Rome, who died at only thirty-two (d. 1610)
- April 1 – William Harvey, English physician (d. 1657)
- April 14 – King Philip III of Spain (d. 1621)
- April 17 – Maximilian van der Sandt, Dutch theologian (d. 1656)
- May 11 – Christian Günther I, Count of Schwarzburg-Sondershausen (1601–1642) (d. 1642)
- June 5 – Claude, Duke of Chevreuse (d. 1657)
- June 13 – Thomas Finch, 2nd Earl of Winchilsea, Member of Parliament (d. 1639)
- July 9 – Ferdinand II, Holy Roman Emperor (d. 1637)
- July 21 – Philipp Hainhofer, German merchant, banker, diplomat and art collector (d. 1647)
- July 27 – Frances Howard, Duchess of Richmond, British duchess (d. 1639)
- July 31 – Countess Catharina Belgica of Nassau, regent of Hanau-Münzenberg (d. 1648)
- August 5 – Charles d'Albert, duc de Luynes, first duke of Chaulnes (d. 1621)
- August 10 – Matteo Rosselli, Italian painter (d. 1650)
- August 17
  - Francesco Albani, Italian painter (d. 1660)
  - Johann, Prince of Hohenzollern-Sigmaringen, first prince of Hohenzollern-Sigmaringen (d. 1638)
- August 24 – John Taylor, English poet who dubbed himself The Water Poet (d. 1653)
- September 11 – Vincenzo Maculani, Italian Catholic cardinal (d. 1667)
- September 17 – John Prideaux, English academic administrator and Anglican bishop (d. 1650)
- October 4 – Giovanni Francesco Guidi di Bagno, Italian Catholic cardinal (d. 1641)
- October 12 – Baldassare Aloisi, Italian painter (d. 1638)
- October 19 – Christine of Hesse-Kassel, Duchess of Saxe-Eisenach and Saxe-Coburg (d. 1658)
- November 4 – Wolfgang Wilhelm, Count Palatine of Neuburg, Duke of Jülich and Berg (1614–1635) (d. 1653)
- November 6 – Maximilian of Liechtenstein, Austrian nobleman and Imperial General (d. 1645)
- December 2 – Agostino Agazzari, Italian composer and music theorist (d. 1640)
- December 7 – Okaji no Kata, Japanese concubine of Tokugawa Ieyasu (d. 1642)
- December 20 – Henry of Lorraine, Duke of Mayenne, French noble (d. 1621)
- December 28 – Henry Bulstrode, English Member of Parliament (d. 1643)
- December 30 – Ulrik of Denmark, Danish prince-bishop (d. 1624)
- approx. date – Fede Galizia, Italian painter
- date unknown
  - Giambattista Andreini, Italian actor and playwright (d. 1650)
  - Yamada Arinaga, Japanese retainer of the Shimazu clan (d. 1668)
  - Benedetto Castelli, Italian scientist (d. 1643)
  - Thomas Coventry, 1st Baron Coventry, English lawyer (d. 1640)
  - Iwasa Matabei, Japanese painter (d. 1650)
  - Samuel Jordan, American colonial legislator (d. 1623)
  - Grzegorz IV Radziwiłł, Polish magnate (d. 1613)
  - François Ravaillac, killer of Henry IV of France (d. 1610)
  - Ambrose Rookwood, English Gunpowder Plot conspirator (d. 1606)
  - Francis Manners, 6th Earl of Rutland (d. 1632)
  - Horio Tadauji, Japanese daimyō (d. 1604)
  - Everard Digby, English conspirator (d. 1606)

1579

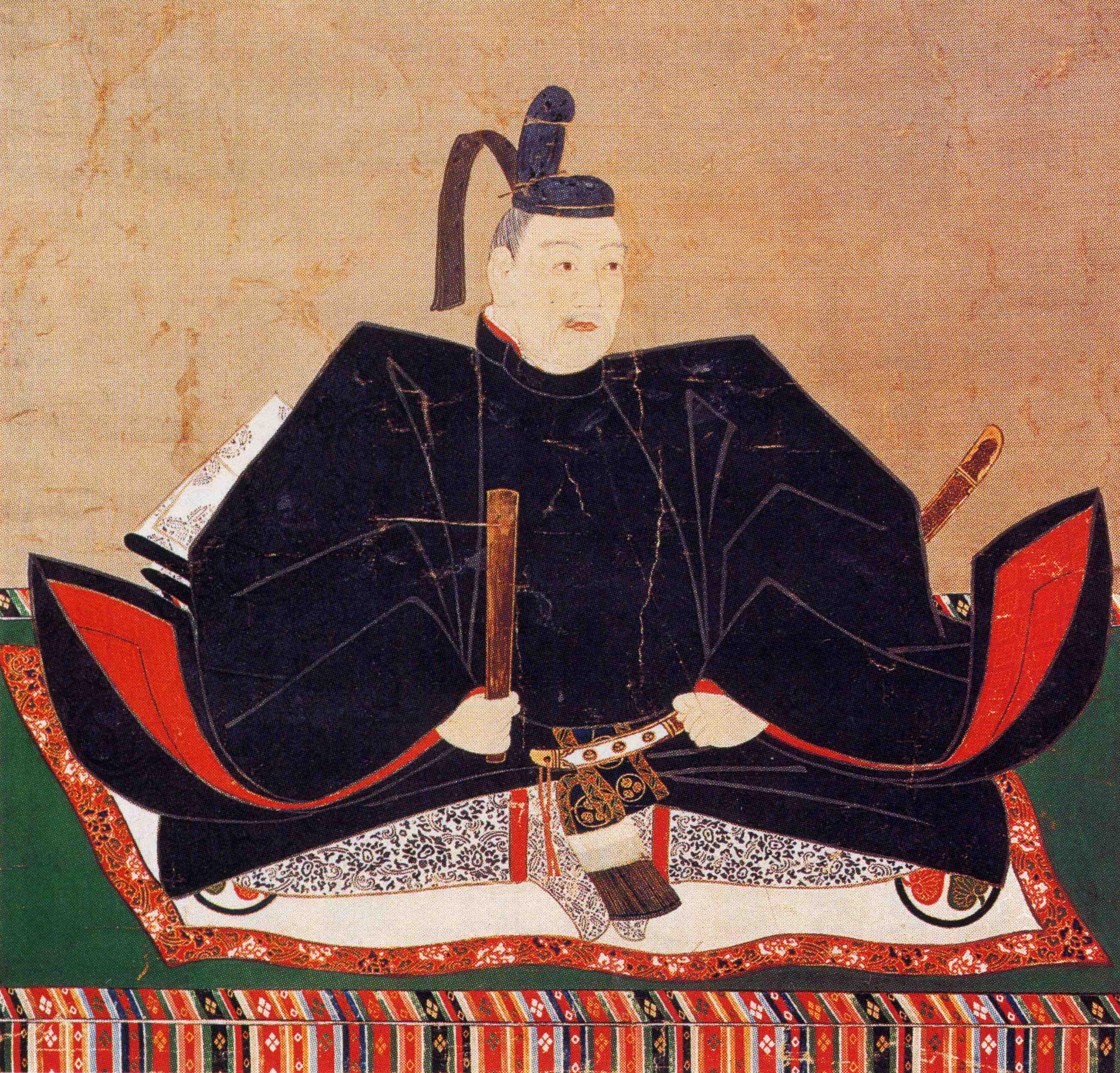
Tokugawa Hidetada

- January 4 – Willem Teellinck, Dutch pastor (d. 1629)
- January 6 – Juan Manuel Pérez de Guzmán, 8th Duke of Medina Sidonia, Spanish nobleman, Knight of the Order of the Golden Fleece (d. 1636)
- January 23 – Marie of Prussia, Margravine of Brandenburg-Bayreuth (d. 1649)
- January 27 – Antonio Tornielli, Italian Catholic prelate who served as Bishop of Novara (1636–1650) (d. 1650)
- February 24 – Johann Jacob Grasser, Swiss poet, historian and theologian (d. 1627)
- March 23 – Francis Mansell, English academic (d. 1665)
- April 10 – Augustus the Younger, Duke of Brunswick-Lüneburg (d. 1666)
- April 12 – François de Bassompierre, French courtier (d. 1646)
- May 1 – Wolphert Gerretse, Dutch founder of the New Netherland Colony (d. 1662)
- May 2 – Tokugawa Hidetada, Japanese shōgun (d. 1632)
- June 17 – Louis I, Prince of Anhalt-Köthen, German prince (d. 1650)
- June 18 – Afonso Mendes, Patriarch of Ethiopia (d. 1659)
- July 2 – Janusz Radziwiłł, Lithuanian and Polish nobleman (d. 1620)
- July 6
  - Bernardino de Almansa Carrión, Spanish Catholic prelate and Archbishop (d. 1633)
  - Francis Norris, 1st Earl of Berkshire, English noble (d. 1622)
- July 13 – Arthur Dee, English physician and alchemist (d. 1651)
- August 1 – Luis Vélez de Guevara, Spanish dramatist and novelist (d. 1644)
- August 18 – Countess Charlotte Flandrina of Nassau, Dutch-French abbess (d. 1640)
- August 21 – Henri, Duke of Rohan, French Huguenot soldier and writer (d. 1638)
- August 23 – Thomas Dempster, Scottish scholar and historian (d. 1625)
- September 1 – John Frederick of Holstein-Gottorp, Prince-Bishop, German Catholic archbishop (d. 1634)
- September 3 – Louis I, Count of Erbach-Erbach (1606–1643) (d. 1643)
- September 16 – Samuel Coster, Dutch writer (d. 1665)
- September 17 – Charles Howard, 2nd Earl of Nottingham, English noble (d. 1642)
- October 4 – Guido Bentivoglio, Italian cardinal (d. 1644)
- October 18 – Anthony Abdy, English merchant (d. 1640)
- November 7 – Juan de Peñalosa, Spanish painter (d. 1633)
- November 11 – Frans Snyders, Flemish painter (d. 1657)
- November 12 – Albrecht of Hanau-Münzenberg, German nobleman (d. 1635)
- November 16 – Federico Baldissera Bartolomeo Cornaro, Italian Catholic cardinal (d. 1653)
- December 9 – Martin de Porres, Peruvian monk, Roman Catholic saint (d. 1639)
- December 20 (bapt.) – John Fletcher, English dramatist (d. 1625)
- date unknown
  - Jacob Astley, 1st Baron Astley of Reading, royalist commander in the English Civil War (d. 1652)
  - Arthur Johnston, Scottish physician and poet (d. 1641)
  - John Ogilvie, Scottish Jesuit, Roman Catholic saint (martyred 1615)
  - Johannes Meursius, Dutch classical scholar and antiquary (d. 1639)

== Deaths ==
1570

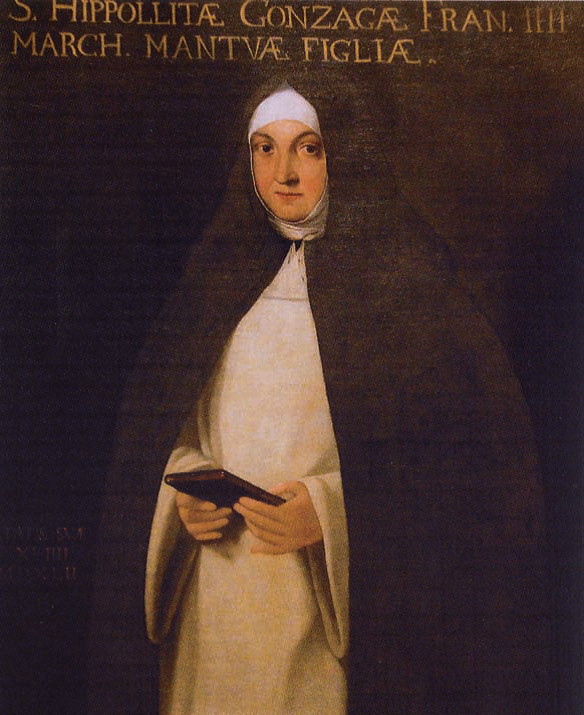
Ippolita Gonzaga

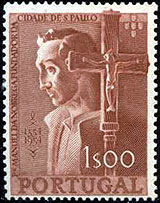
Manuel da Nobrega

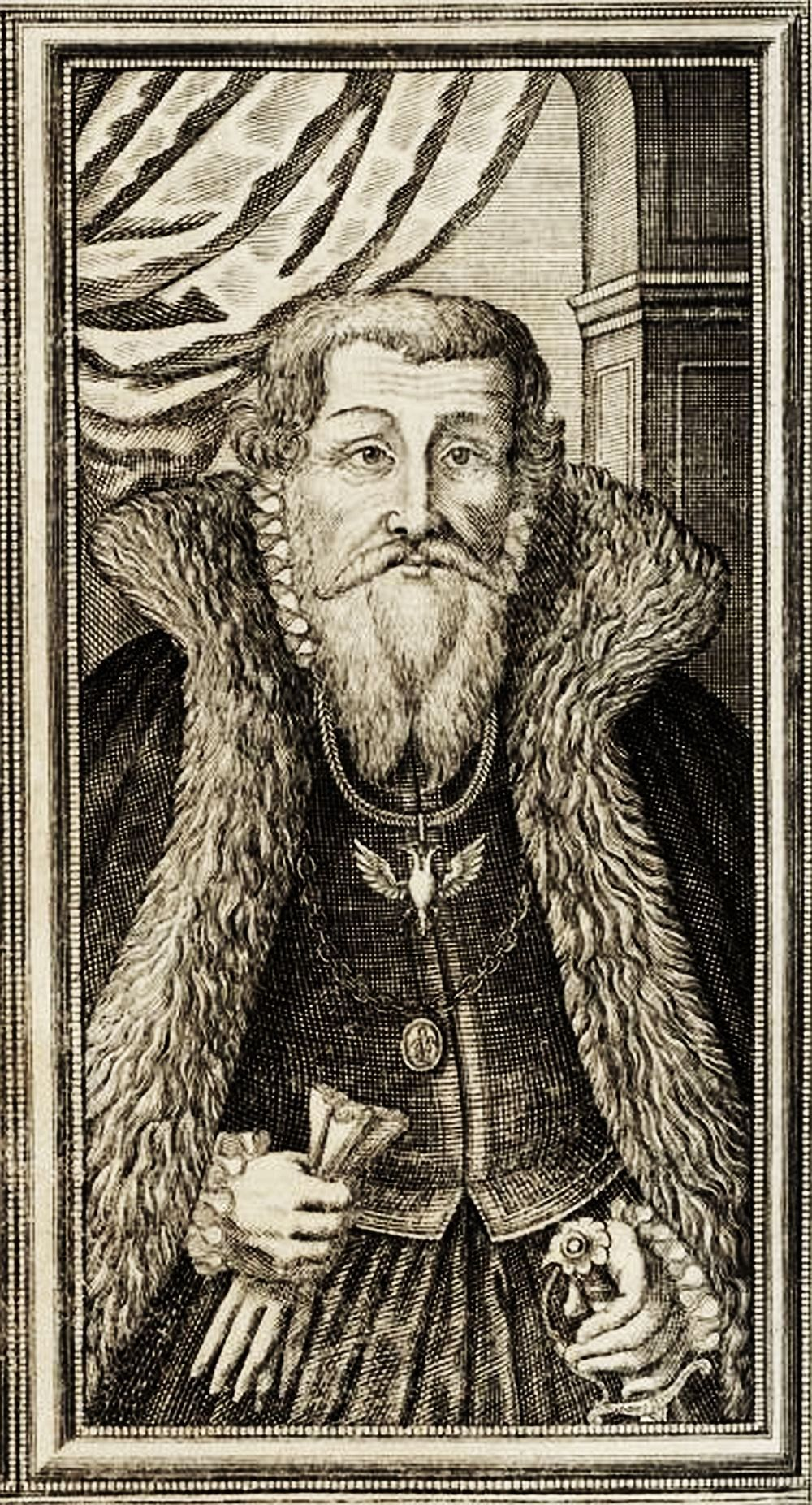
Duke Frederick III of Legnica

- January 8 – Philibert de l'Orme, French architect (b. 1510)
- February – Henry Balnaves, Scottish politician and religious reformer (b. 1512)
- January 23 – James Stewart, 1st Earl of Moray, regent of Scotland (assassinated) (b. c.1531)
- February 13 – Eleonora Gonzaga, Duchess of Urbino, politically active Italian duchess (b. 1493)
- February 20 – Johannes Scheubel, German mathematician (b. 1494)
- March 1 – Bernhard VII, Prince of Anhalt-Zerbst (b. 1540)
- March 16 – Ippolita Gonzaga, Italian nun (b. 1503)
- April 13 – Daniele Barbaro, Italian architect (b. 1514)
- July 3 – Aonio Paleario, Italian humanist and reformer (executed) (b. c. 1500)
- July 25 – Ivan Mikhailovich Viskovatyi, Russian diplomat
- August 4 – Marie Catherine Gondi, French court official (b. c. 1500)
- September 11 – Johannes Brenz, German theologian and Protestant Reformer (b. 1499)
- October 1 – Frans Floris, Flemish painter (b. 1520)
- October 18 – Manuel da Nóbrega, Portuguese Jesuit missionary in Brazil (b. 1517)
- October 20
  - João de Barros, Portuguese historian (b. 1496)
  - Francesco Laparelli, Italian architect (b. 1521)
- November – Jacques Grévin, French dramatist (b. 1539)
- November 21 – Ruxandra Lăpușneanu, Moldavian regent (b. 1538)
- November 27 – Jacopo Sansovino, Italian sculptor and architect (b. 1486)
- December 15 – Frederick III of Legnica, Duke of Legnica (b. 1520)
- date unknown
  - François Bonivard, Swiss patriot and historian (b. 1496)
  - Francesco Primaticcio, Italian painter, architect, and sculptor (b. 1504)
  - Tomás de Santa María, Spanish music theorist
  - Agostino Gallo, Italian agronomist (b. 1499)

1571

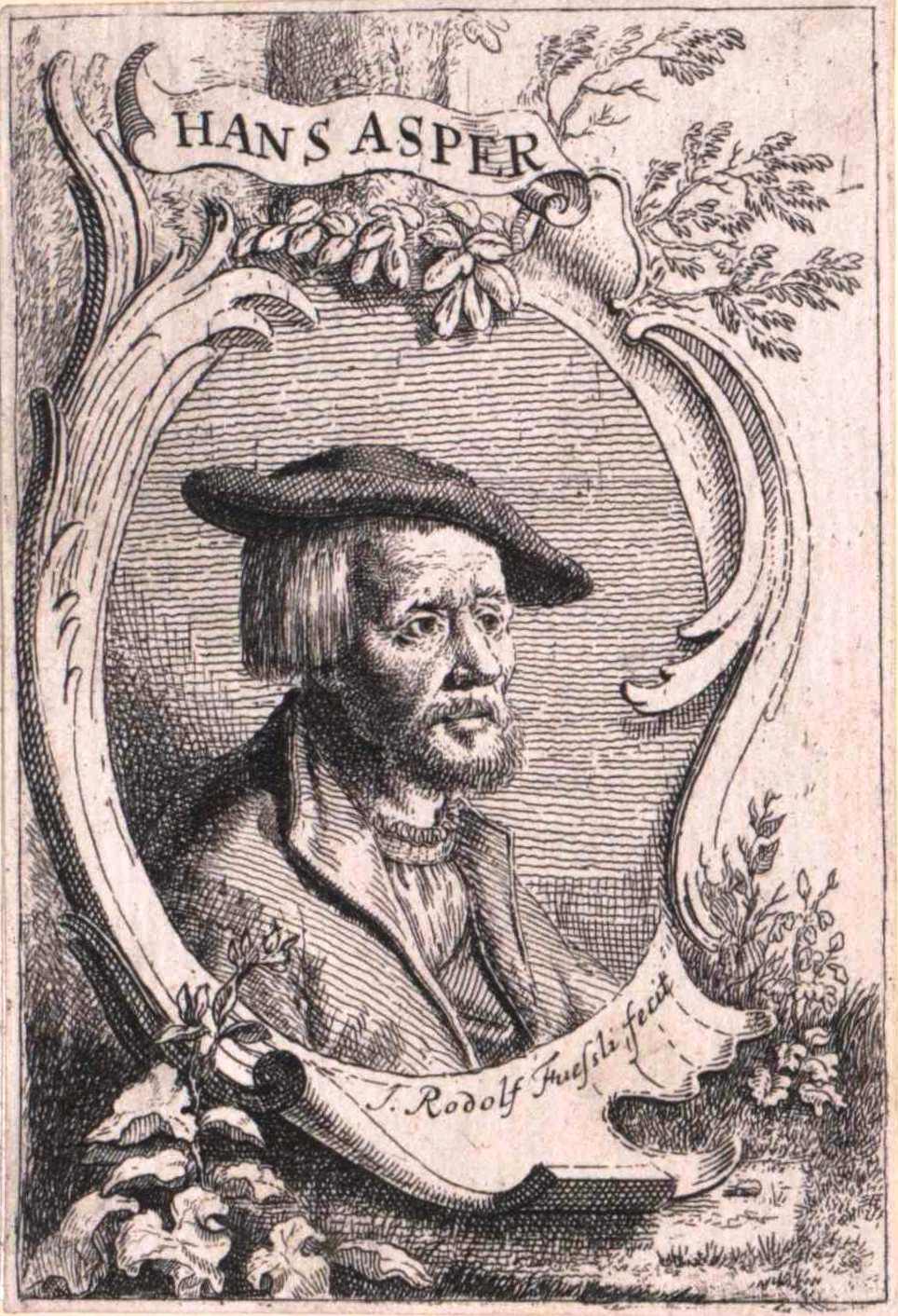
Hans Asper

- January 3
  - Joachim II Hector, Elector of Brandenburg (b. 1505)
  - Yi Hwang, Korean Neo-Confucian scholar, (b.1502)
- January 9 – Nicolas Durand de Villegaignon, French naval officer (b. 1510)
- January 13 – John, Margrave of Brandenburg-Küstrin (b. 1513)
- January 19 – Paris Bordone, Venetian painter (b. 1495)
- February 12 – Nicholas Throckmorton, English diplomat and politician (b. 1515)
- February 13 – Benvenuto Cellini, Italian artist (b. 1500)
- March 6 – Tsukahara Bokuden, Japanese swordsman (b. 1489)
- March 14 – John Sigismund Zápolya, King of Hungary (b. 1540)
- March 21
  - Odet de Coligny, French cardinal and Protestant (b. 1517)
  - Hans Asper, Swiss painter (b. 1499)
- April 6 – John Hamilton, Scottish prelate and politician (b. 1511)
- May 4 – Pierre Viret, Swiss theologian (b. 1511)
- May 29 – Joachim Mörlin, German Lutheran bishop (b. 1514)
- June 1 – John Story, English Catholic (martyred) (b. 1504)
- June 3 – Tarik Sulayman, Filipino chieftain
- June 7 – Francesco Corteccia, Italian composer (b. 1502)
- July 6 – Mōri Motonari, Japanese warlord (b. 1497)
- July 15 – Shimazu Takahisa, Japanese samurai and warlord (b. 1514)
- July 17 – Georg Fabricius, German poet (b. 1516)
- August 17 – Marco Antonio Bragadin, Venetian lawyer and military officer (b. 1523)
- September 4 – Matthew Stewart, 4th Earl of Lennox (b. 1516)
- September 23 – John Jewel, English Anglican bishop (b. 1522)
- October 7
  - Dorothea of Saxe-Lauenburg, Danish queen, consort of Christian III of Denmark (b. 1511)
  - Müezzinzade Ali Pasha, Ottoman statesmen and naval officer
- November 24 – Jan Blahoslav, Czech writer (b. 1523)
- December 14 – Lorenzo Strozzi, Italian Catholic cardinal (b. 1513)
- date unknown
  - Titu Cusi, Incan ruler (b. 1529)
  - Anna Vigfúsdóttir á Stóru-Borg, Icelandic landowner
  - Setthathirath, Laotian king of Lan Na and Lan Xang (b. 1534)

1572

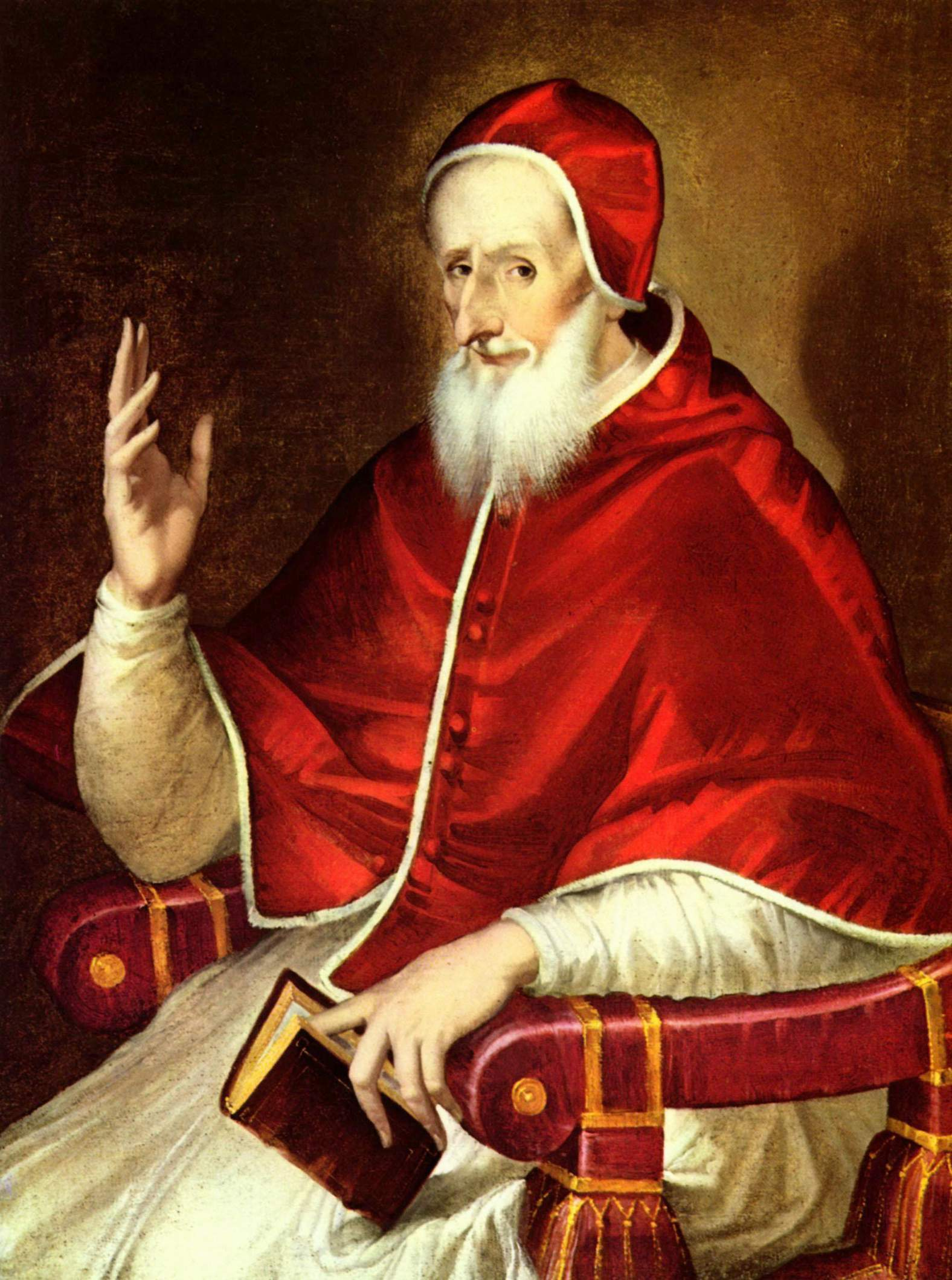
Pope Pius V

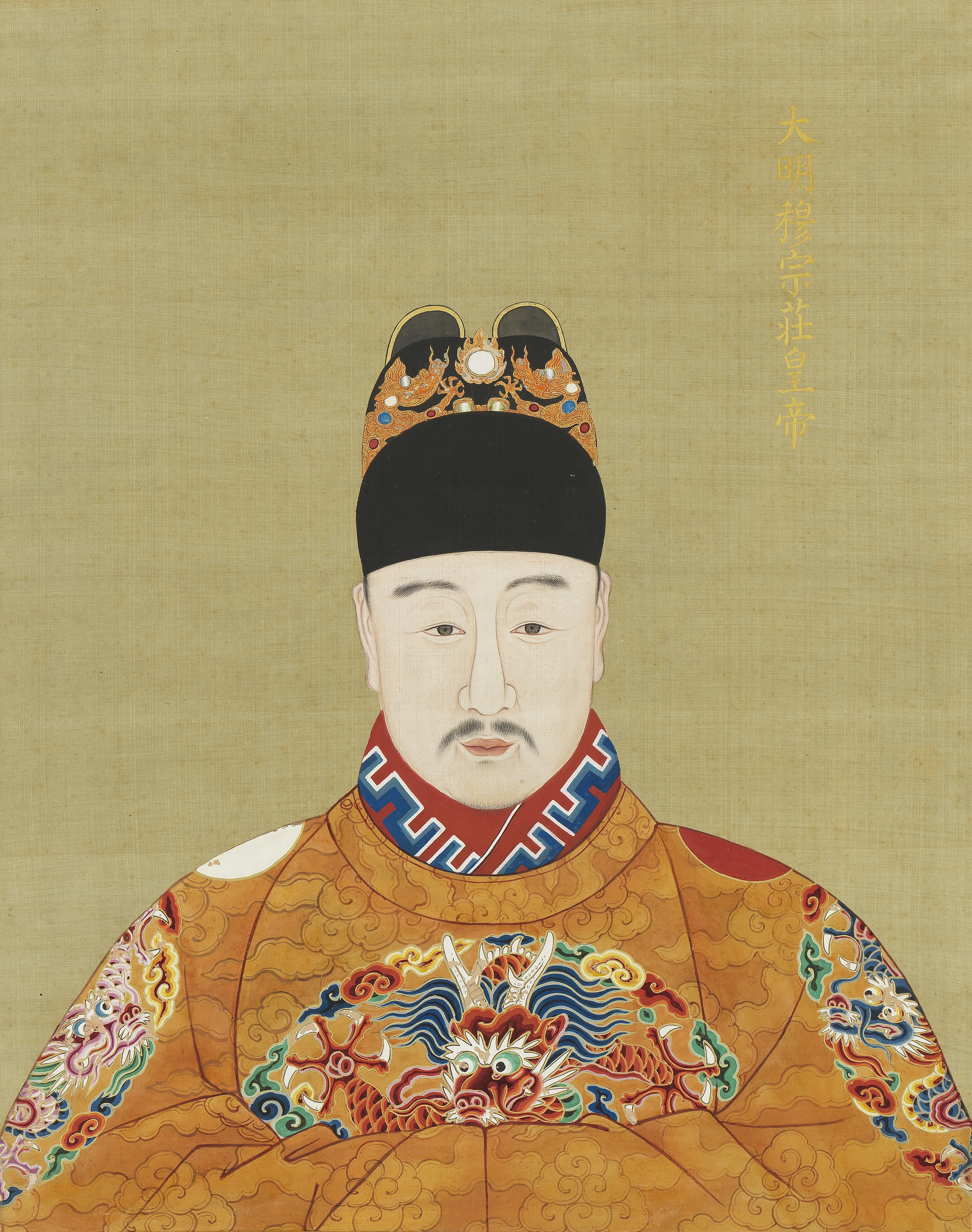
Longqing Emperor of China

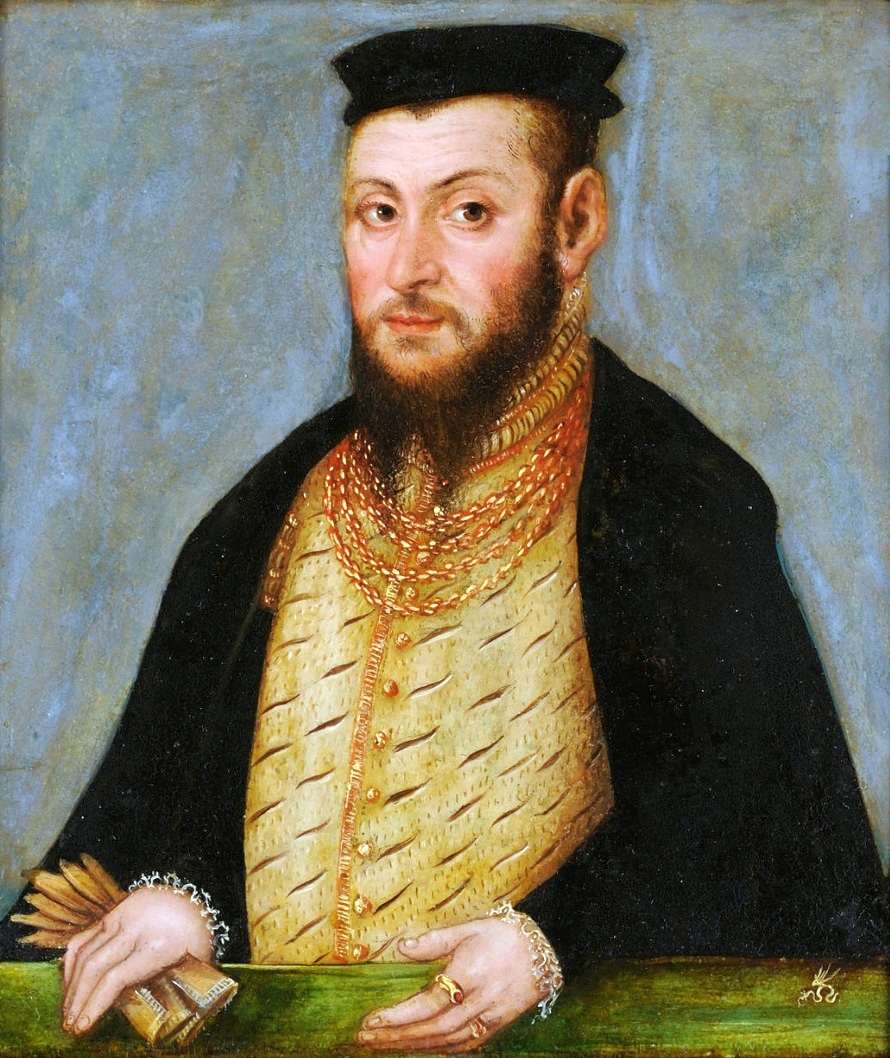
King Sigismund II Augustus of Poland

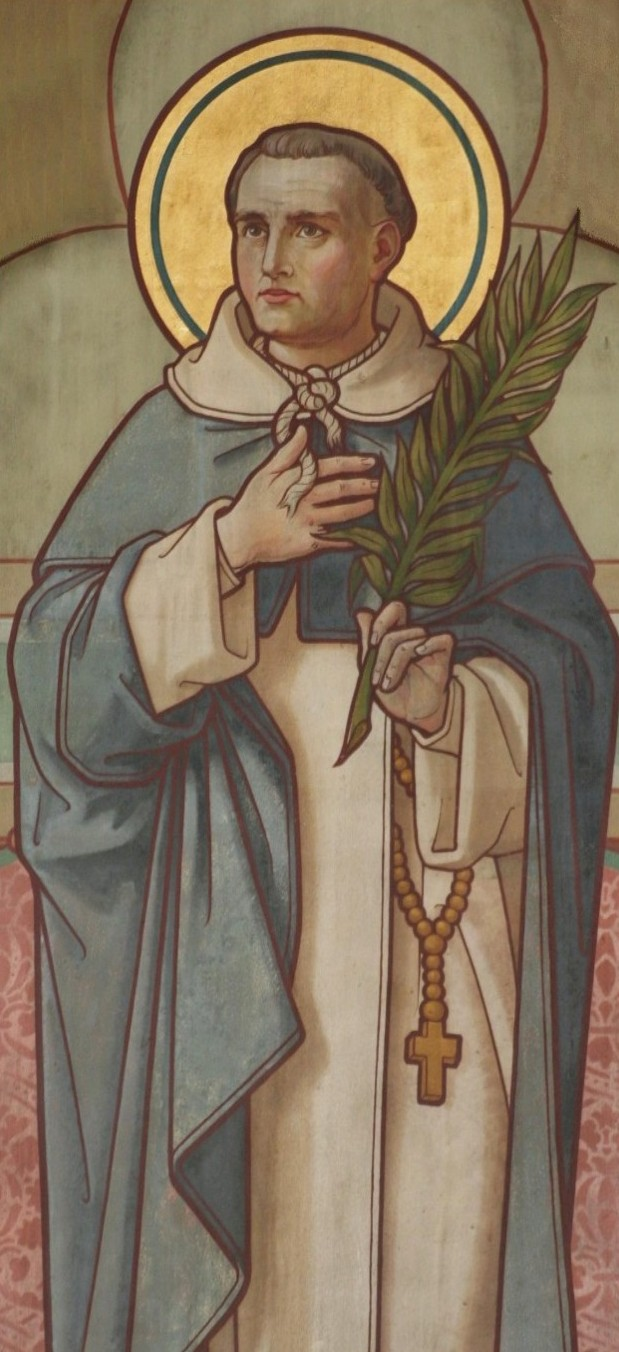
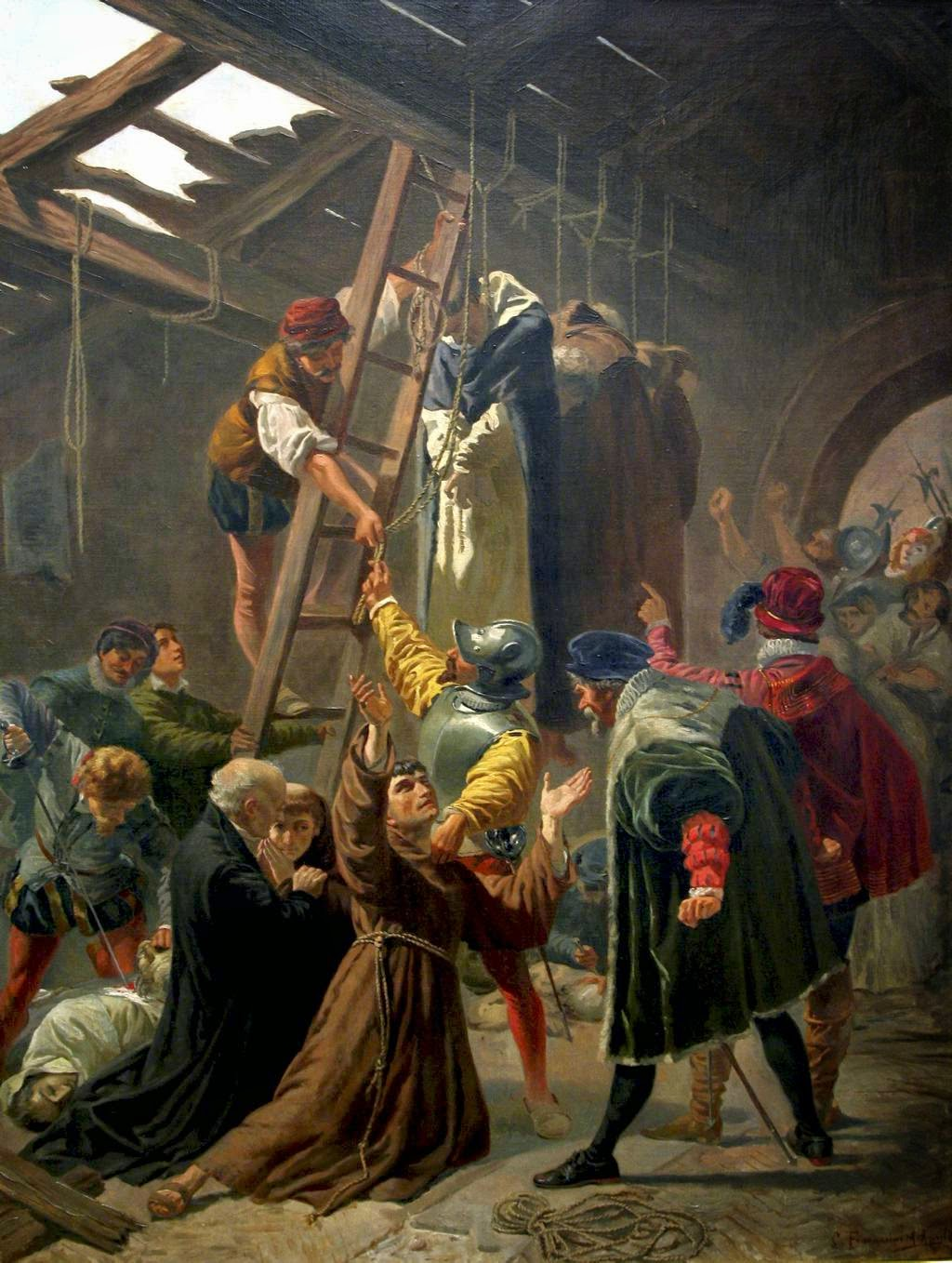
Saint John of Cologne and Martyrs of Gorkum died on July 7, 1572

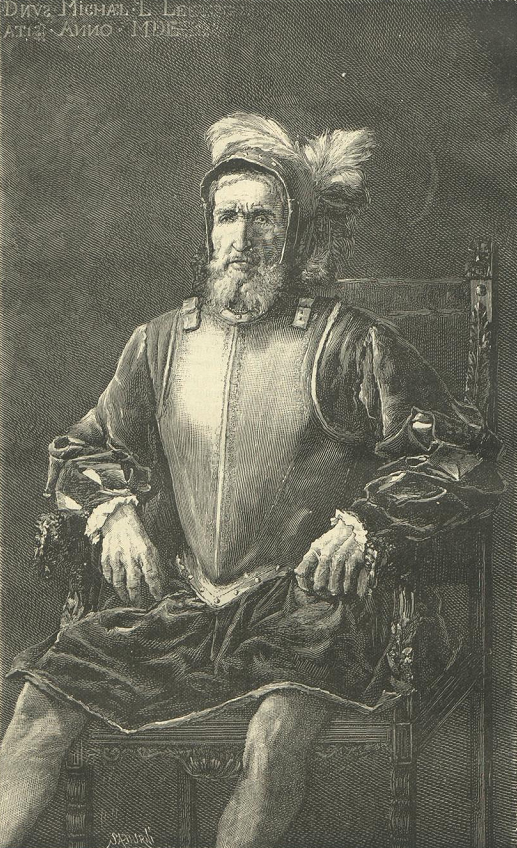
Miguel Lopez de Legazpi

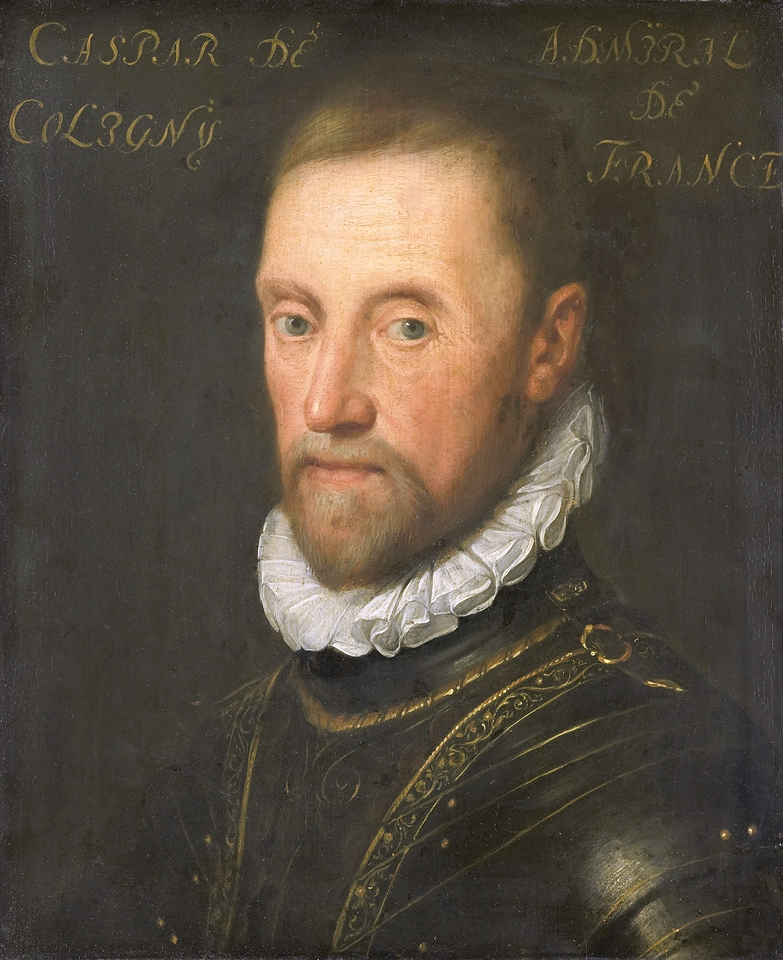
Gaspard de Coligny

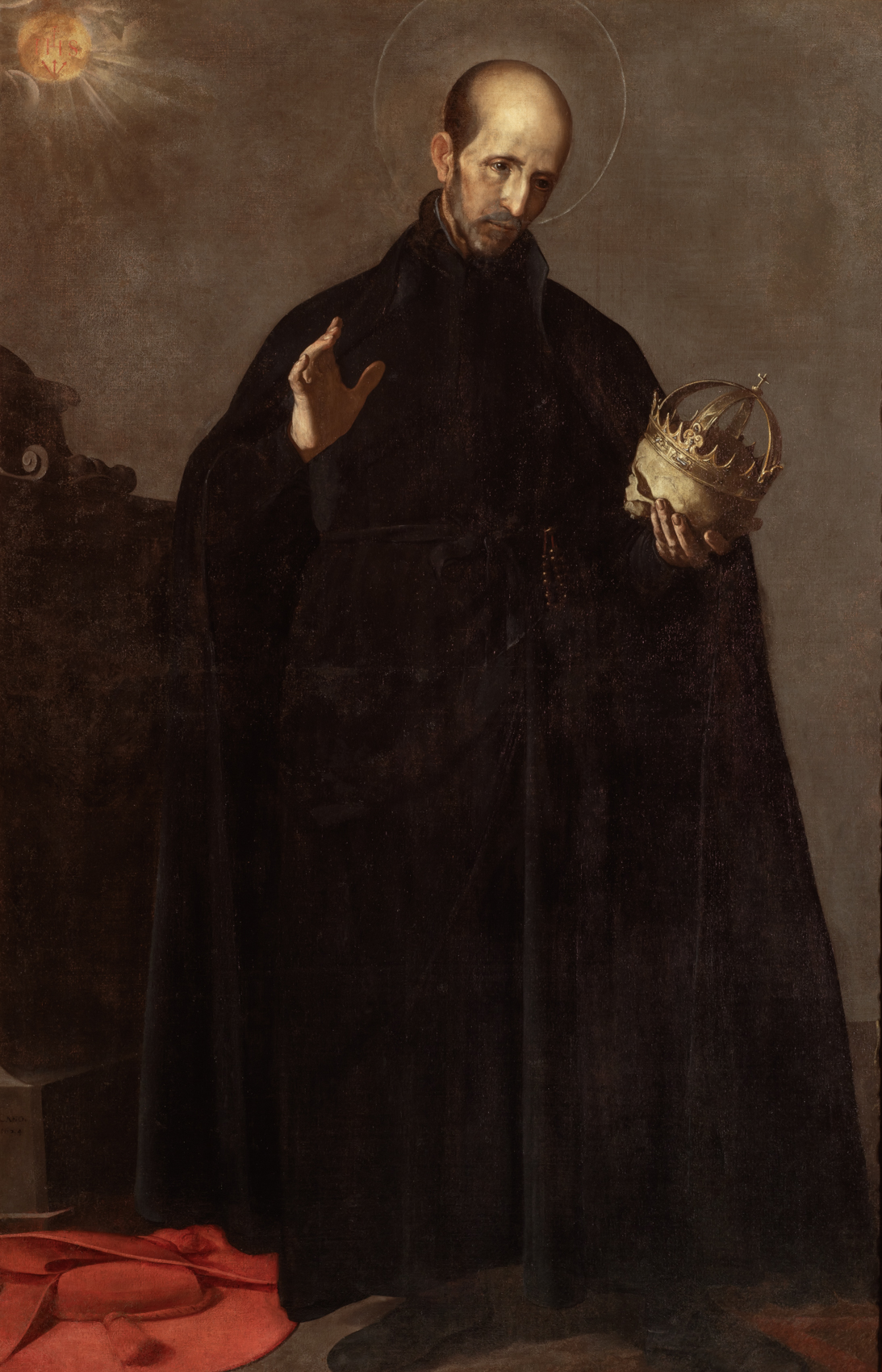
Saint Francis Borgia

- January 22 – Henry VI, Burgrave of Plauen (b. 1536)
- January 26 – Pierre de Monte, French 50th Grandmaster of the Knights Hospitaller (b. 1499)
- February 21 – Cho Shik, Korean Confucian scholar and politician (b. 1501)
- February 23 – Pierre Certon, French composer (b. c. 1510)
- February 26 – Pedro Agustín, Spanish Roman Catholic bishop (b. 1512)
- February 28
  - Aegidius Tschudi, Swiss historian (b. 1505)
  - Catherine of Austria, Queen of Poland (b. 1533)
  - Udai Singh II, King of Mewar (b. 1522)
- March 2 – Mem de Sá, Portuguese Governor-General of Brazil (b. c. 1500)
- March 10 – William Paulet, 1st Marquess of Winchester (b. c. 1483)
- March 27 – Girolamo Maggi, Italian Renaissance man (b. c. 1523)
- April 2 – Elisabeth of Brunswick-Lüneburg, Duchess of Guelders (1518–1538) (b. 1494)
- May 1 – Pope Pius V (b. 1504)
- May 11 – Moses Isserles, Polish Jewish rabbi and Talmudist (b. 1530)
- June 2 – Thomas Howard, 4th Duke of Norfolk (executed) (b. 1536)
- June 9 – Jeanne d'Albret, Queen of Navarre (b. 1528)
- June 28 – Johannes Goropius Becanus, Dutch physician, linguist, and humanist (b. 1519)
- July 5 – Longqing Emperor of China (b. 1537)
- July 7 – King Sigismund II Augustus of Poland (b. 1520)
- July 9
  - John of Cologne, Dutch Franciscan friar, martyr and saint (b. 1510)
  - Martyrs of Gorkum (b. Dutch nationality)
  - Nicholas Pieck, Dutch Franciscan friar, martyr and saint (b. 1534)
- July 25 – Isaac Luria, Palestinian-born Jewish Kabbalist (b. 1534)
- August 20 – Miguel López de Legazpi, Spanish conquistador (b. 1502)
- August 24
  - Gaspard de Coligny, French Protestant leader (b. 1519)
  - Charles de Téligny, French soldier and diplomat (b. 1535)
- August 26 – Pierre de la Ramée, French humanist scholar (b. 1515)
- August – Claude Goudimel, French composer (b. 1510)
- September – Denis Lambin, French classical scholar (b. 1520)
- September 19 – Archduchess Barbara of Austria (b. 1539)
- September 24 – Túpac Amaru, last of the Incas
- September 30 – Francis Borgia, Italian Jesuit priest and saint (b. 1510)
- October 24 – Edward Stanley, 3rd Earl of Derby, English politician (b. 1508)
- October 25 – Cosimo Bartoli, Italian diplomat and writer (b. 1503)
- October 29 – John Erskine, Earl of Mar, regent of Scotland
- November 9 – Al-Mutahhar, Imam of the Zaidi state of Yemen (b. 1503)
- November 12 – Henry of Stolberg, German nobleman (b. 1509)
- November 23 – Agnolo di Cosimo (Bronzino), Italian artist and poet (b. 1503)
- November 24 – John Knox, Scottish religious reformer (b. 1513)
- December 2 – Ippolito II d'Este, Italian cardinal and statesman (b. 1509)
- December 12 – Loredana Marcello, Venetian dogaressa and botanist
- December 22 – François Clouet, French miniaturist (b. c. 1510)
- December 23 – Johann Sylvan, Reformed German theologian (executed; date of birth unknown)
- date unknown
  - Andrzej Frycz Modrzewski, Polish scholar (b. 1503)
  - Francisco de Moraes, Portuguese author and writer (b. 1500)
  - Yasumi Naomasa, Japanese military commander
  - Stanisław Zamoyski, Polish nobleman (b. 1519)
- probable – Christopher Tye, English composer and organist (b. 1505)

1573

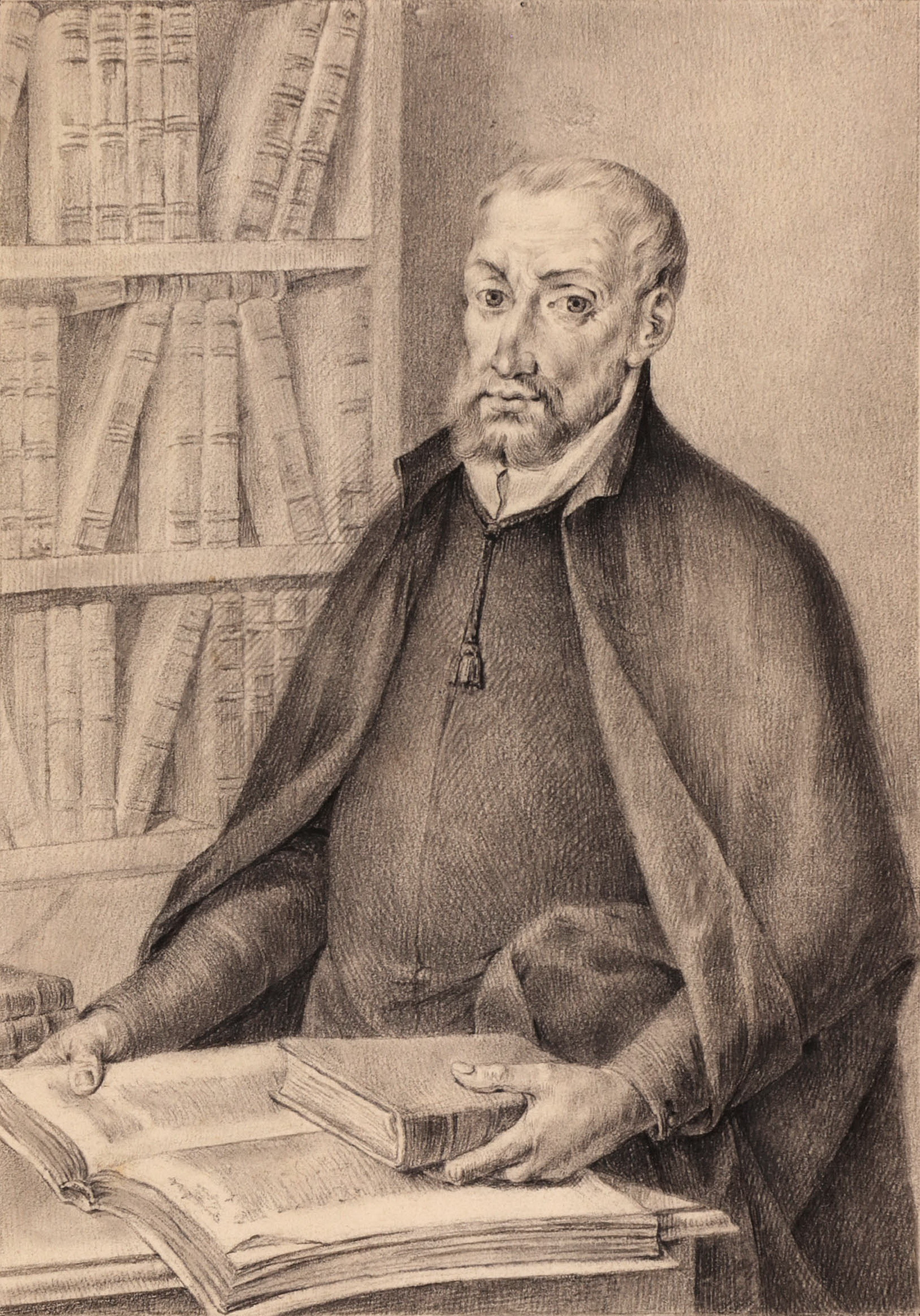
Juan Ginés de Sepúlveda

- January 1
  - Hans Boije af Gennäs, Swedish commander
  - Johann Pfeffinger, German theologian (b. 1493)
- January 12 – William Howard, 1st Baron Howard of Effingham, English Lord High Admiral (b. 1510)
- February 7 – Hedwig Jagiellon, Electress of Brandenburg (b. 1513)
- March 2 – Johann Wilhelm, Duke of Saxe-Weimar (b. 1530)
- March 3 – Claude, Duke of Aumale, third son of Claude, Duke of Guise (b. 1526)
- March 13 – Michel de l'Hôpital, French statesman (b. 1505)
- March 17 – Maria van Schooten, Dutch war heroine (b. 1555)
- April 2 – Otto Truchsess von Waldburg, German Catholic cardinal (b. 1514)
- April 7 – Andreas Masius, Flemish Catholic priest (b. 1514)
- April 29 – Guillaume Le Testu, French privateer (b. 1509)
- May 13 – Takeda Shingen, Japanese warlord (b. 1521)
- June 15 – Antun Vrančić, Croatian archbishop (b. 1504)
- July – Étienne Jodelle, French dramatist and poet (b. 1532)
- July 7 – Giacomo Barozzi da Vignola, Italian architect (b. 1507)
- July 16 – Wigbolt Ripperda, mayor of Haarlem, Netherlands
- July 29
  - John Caius, English physician (b. 1510)
  - Ruy Gómez de Silva, Portuguese noble (b. 1516)
- August 14 – Saitō Tatsuoki, Japanese warlord (b. 1548)
- September 7 – Joanna of Austria, Princess of Portugal (b. 1535)
- September 16 – Asakura Yoshikage, Japanese warlord (b. 1533)
- September 23 – Azai Hisamasa, Japanese warlord (b. 1526)
- September 26 – Azai Nagamasa, Japanese warlord (b. 1545)
- October 27 – Laurentius Petri, first Lutheran Archbishop of Sweden (b. 1499)
- November 9 – Shimazu Katsuhisa, Japanese nobleman (b. 1503)
- November 17 – Juan Ginés de Sepúlveda, Spanish philosopher and theologian (b. 1494)
- December 30 – Giovanni Battista Giraldi, Italian novelist and poet (b. 1504)
- date unknown
  - Paul Skalich, Croatian encyclopedist (b. 1534)
  - Reginald Wolfe, English printer
- February 3 – Murakami Yoshikiyo, Japanese warlord (b. 1501)
  - Richard Grafton, English merchant and printer (b. c.1506/7)

1574

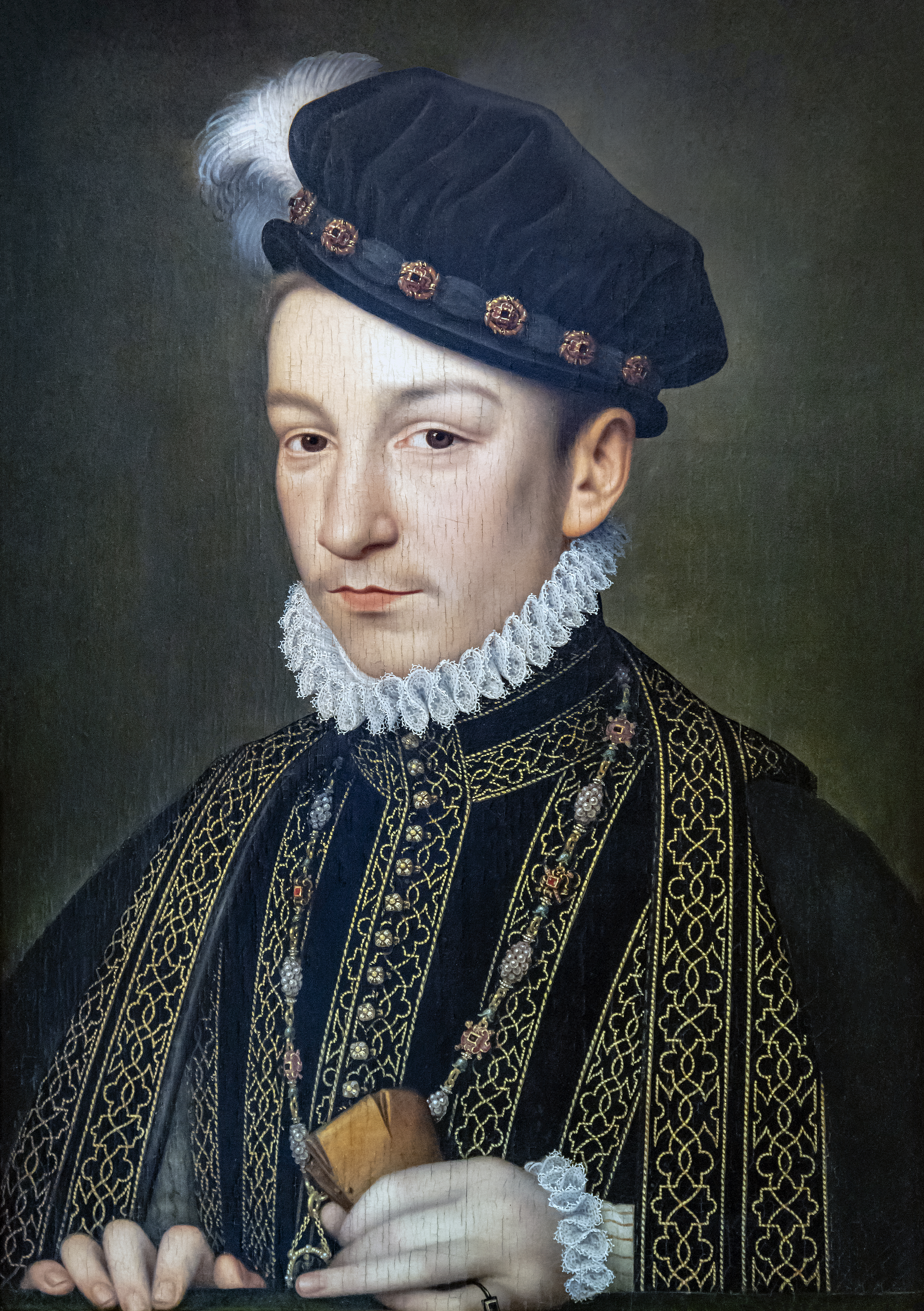
Charles IX of France

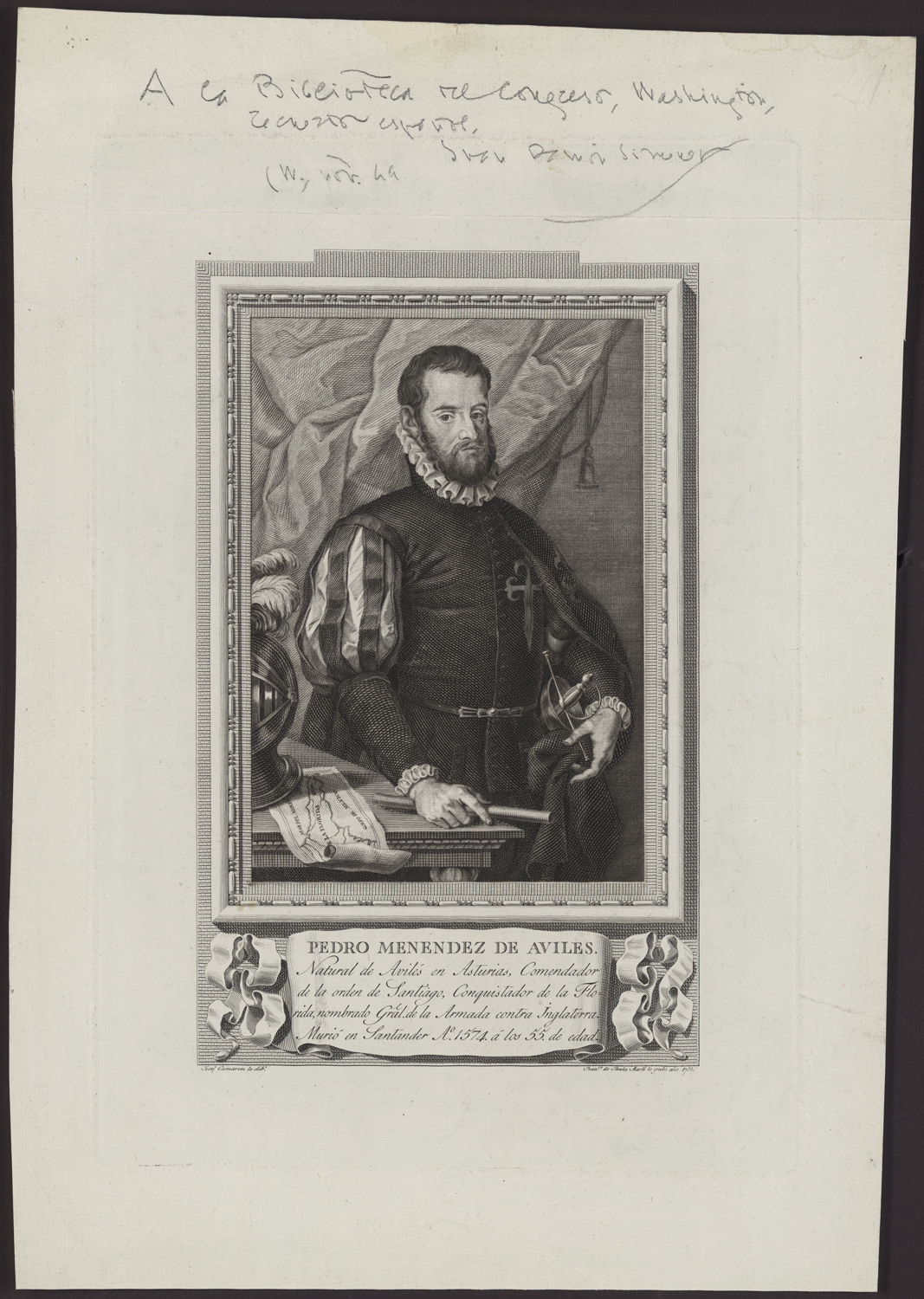
Pedro Menendez de Aviles

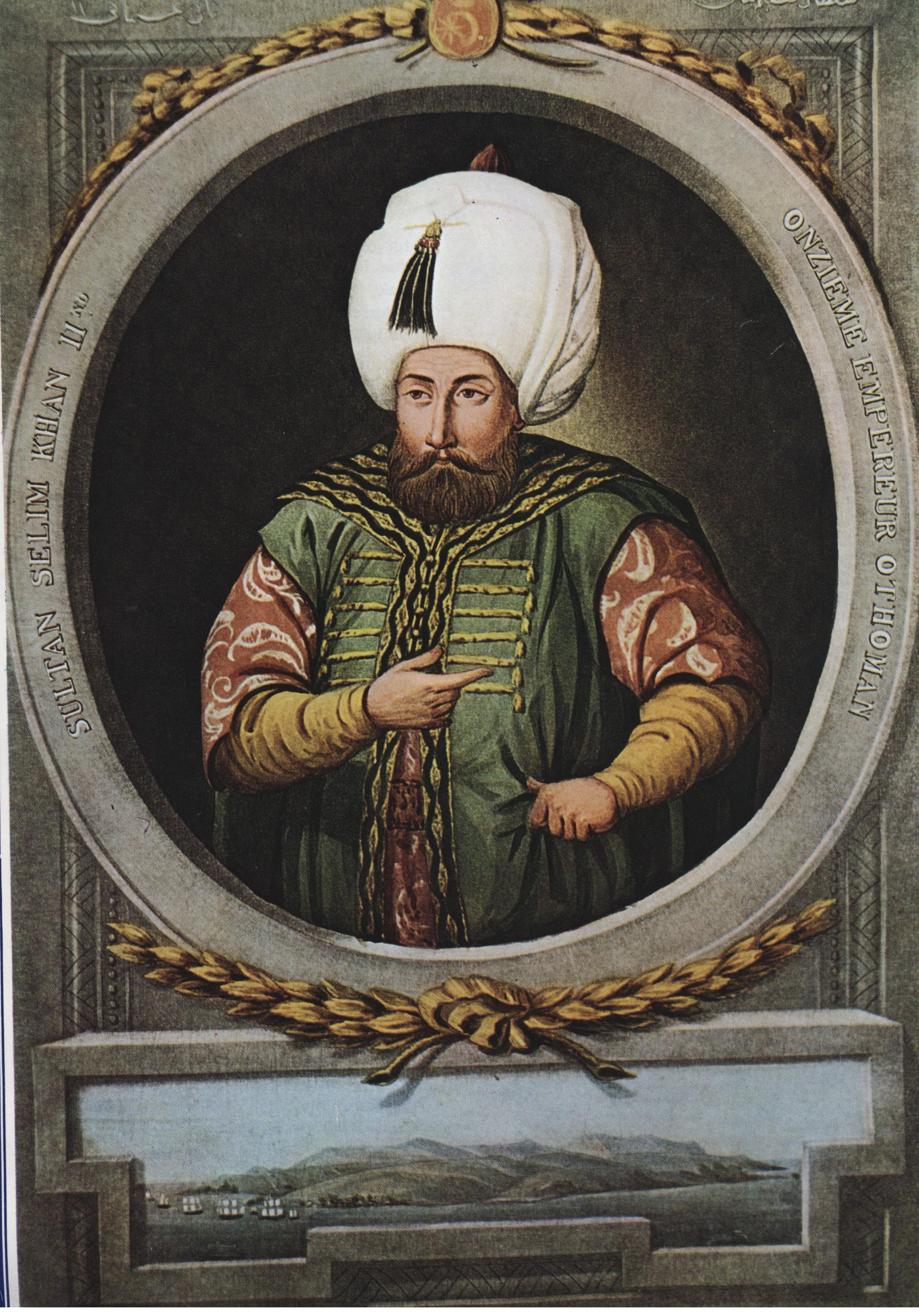
Sultan Selim II

- January 26 – Martin Helwig, German cartographer of Silesia (b. 1516)
- January 30 – Damião de Góis, Portuguese philosopher (b. 1502)
- March 4 – Anna II, Princess-Abbess of Quedlinburg, German noblewoman, reigning from 1516 until her death (b. 1504)
- March 27 – Takeda Nobutora, Japanese warlord (b. 1494)
- April 14 – Louis of Nassau, Dutch general (b. 1538)
- April 17 – Joachim Camerarius, German classical scholar (b. 1500)
- April 21 – Cosimo I de' Medici, Grand Duke of Tuscany (b. 1519)
- April 30 – Joseph Boniface de La Molle, Provençale lover of Marguerite de Valois (b. 1530)
- May 14 – Guru Amar Das, third Sikh Guru (b. 1479)
- May 3 – Giovanni Ricci, Italian Catholic cardinal (b. 1498)
- May 30 – King Charles IX of France (b. 1550)
- June 12 – Renée of France, French princess (b. 1510)
- June 14 – John III the Terrible, Voivode of Moldavia (b. 1521)
- June 26 – Gabriel, comte de Montgomery, captain of the Scottish Guard of Henry II of France (b. 1530)
- June 27 – Giorgio Vasari, Italian painter and architect (b. 1511)
- July 26 – Birgitte Gøye, Danish county administrator, lady in waiting, landholder and educator (b. 1511)
- August 23 – Ebussuud Efendi, Ottoman Grand Mufti (b. 1490)
- August 27 – Bartolomeo Eustachi, Italian anatomist
- September 1 – Louis, Count of Stolberg, German noble (b. 1505)
- September 4 – Charles de Mornay, Swedish (originally French) court official, diplomat and royal favorite (b. 1514)
- September 15 – Margaret of France, Duchess of Berry (b. 1523)
- September 17 – Pedro Menéndez de Avilés, Spanish admiral and explorer (b. 1519)
- September 26 – Elisabeth of Anhalt-Zerbst, Abbess of Gernrode and Frose, Countess of Barby-Mühlingen (b. 1545)
- September 28 – Guidobaldo II della Rovere, Duke of Urbino, Italian condottiero (b. 1514)
- October 1 – Maarten van Heemskerck, Dutch painter (b. 1498)
- November 23 – John III, Count of Nassau-Saarbrücken, German noble (b. 1511)
- November 28 – Georg Major, German Protestant theologian (b. 1502)
- December 4 – Georg Joachim Rheticus, German mathematician and cartographer (b. 1514)
- December 12 – Selim II, Ottoman Sultan (b. 1524)
- December 25 – Charles, Cardinal of Lorraine (b. 1524)
- date unknown
  - Hans Eworth, Flemish painter (b. 1520)
  - Martin de Goiti, Spanish conquistador

1575

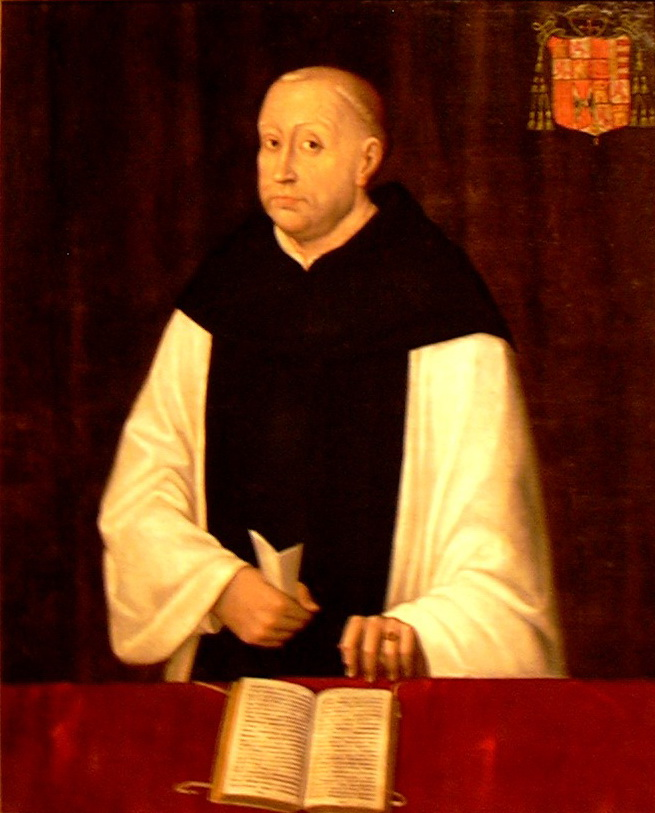
Hernando de Aragón

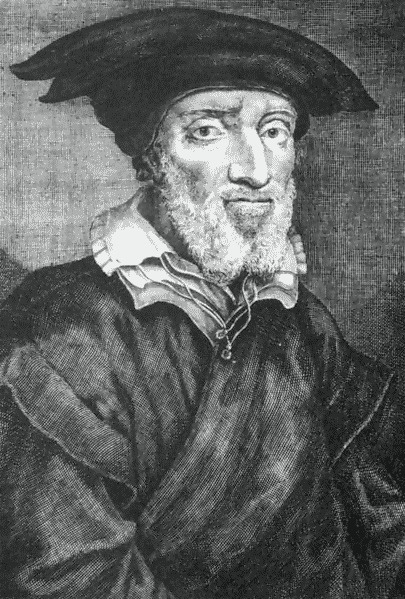
Matthias Flacius

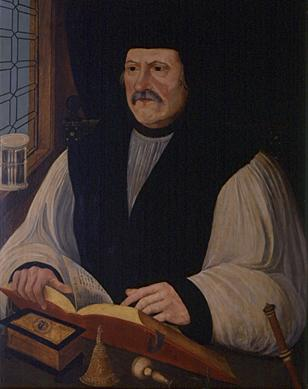
Reverend Matthew Parker

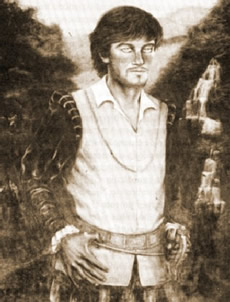
Francisco de Ibarra

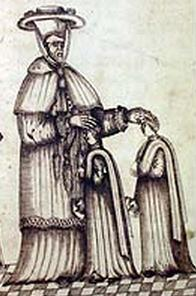
Gaspar Cervantes de Gaeta

- January 4 – Sidonie of Saxony, Duchess of Brunswick-Calenberg (b. 1518)
- January 14 – Barbara Uthmann, German businessperson (b. 1514)
- January 22 – James Hamilton, Duke of Châtellerault (b. 1516)
- January 29 – Hernando de Aragón, Spanish Roman Catholic archbishop (b. 1498)
- February 9 – Karl Friedrich of Jülich-Cleves-Berg, heir apparent of Jülich-Cleves-Berg (b. 1555)
- February 20 – Maria of Jever, last ruler of the Lordship of Jever (b. 1500)
- February 21 – Claude of Valois, Duchess consort of Lorraine and French princess (b. 1547)
- March 11 – Matthias Flacius, Croatian Protestant reformer (b. 1520)
- March 15 – Annibale Padovano, Italian composer and organist (b. 1527)
- March 17 – Georg Cracow, German lawyer and politician (b. 1525)
- March 24 – Yosef Karo, Spanish-born Jewish rabbi. Author of the book "Shulchan Aruch" (b. 1488)
- May 17 – Matthew Parker, English Roman Catholic archbishop (b. 1504)
- May 28 – Sophia Jagiellon, Duchess of Brunswick-Lüneburg (b. 1522)
- June 3 – Francisco de Ibarra, Spanish explorer and colonial governor in Mexico (b. c. 1539)
- June 7 – Sir George Heron, English politician
- June 28 – Yonekura Shigetsugu, Japanese samurai
- June 29
  - Baba Nobuharu, Japanese samurai
  - Hara Masatane, Japanese samurai (b. 1531)
  - Naito Masatoyo, Japanese samurai (b. 1522)
  - Sanada Nobutsuna, Japanese samurai (b. 1537)
  - Takeda Nobuzane, Japanese daimyō
  - Yamagata Masakage, Japanese samurai (b. 1524)
- July 14 – Richard Taverner, English Bible translator (b. 1505)
- July 29 – Jon Simonssøn, Norwegian humanist (b. 1512)
- August 2 – Christopher II, Margrave of Baden-Rodemachern (b. 1537)
- September 17 – Heinrich Bullinger, Swiss religious reformer (b. 1504)
- September 24 – Anna of Oldenburg, Regent of East Frisia (b. 1501)
- October 17 – Gaspar Cervantes de Gaeta, Spanish Roman Catholic cardinal (b. 1511)
- October 20 – Kaspar Eberhard, German theologian (b. 1523)
- October 24 – Peder Oxe, Danish finance minister (b. 1520)
- November 2 – Sabina of Brandenburg-Ansbach, German princess (b. 1529)
- December 1 – Diego Andrada de Payva, Portuguese theologian (b. 1528)
- December 23 – Akiyama Nobutomo, Japanese retainer (b. 1531)
- December 31 – Pierino Belli, Italian soldier and jurist (b. 1502)
- date unknown
  - Constantio Varoli, Italian anatomist (b. 1543)
  - Isabel de Josa, Catalan writer (b. 1508)

1576

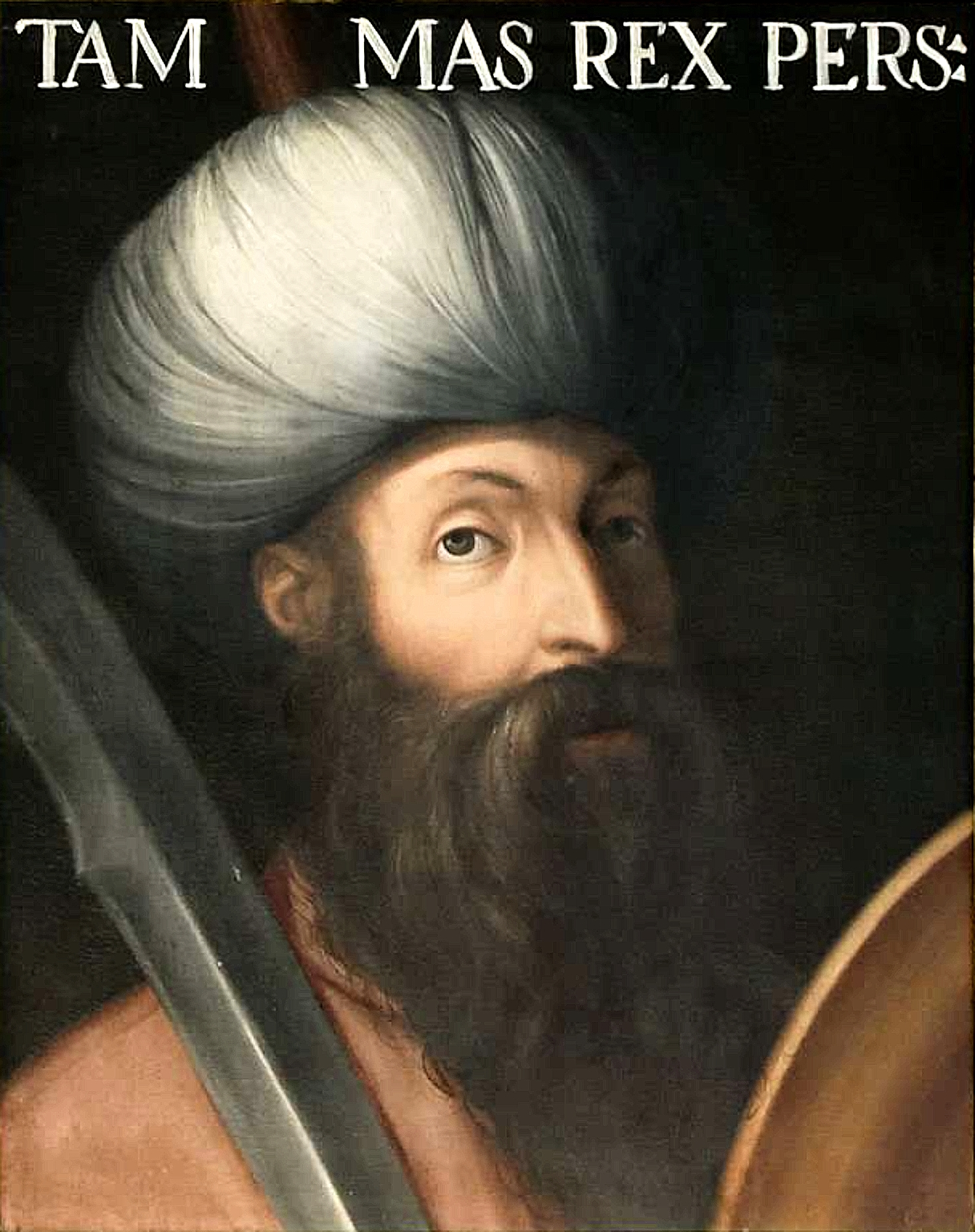
Tahmasp I

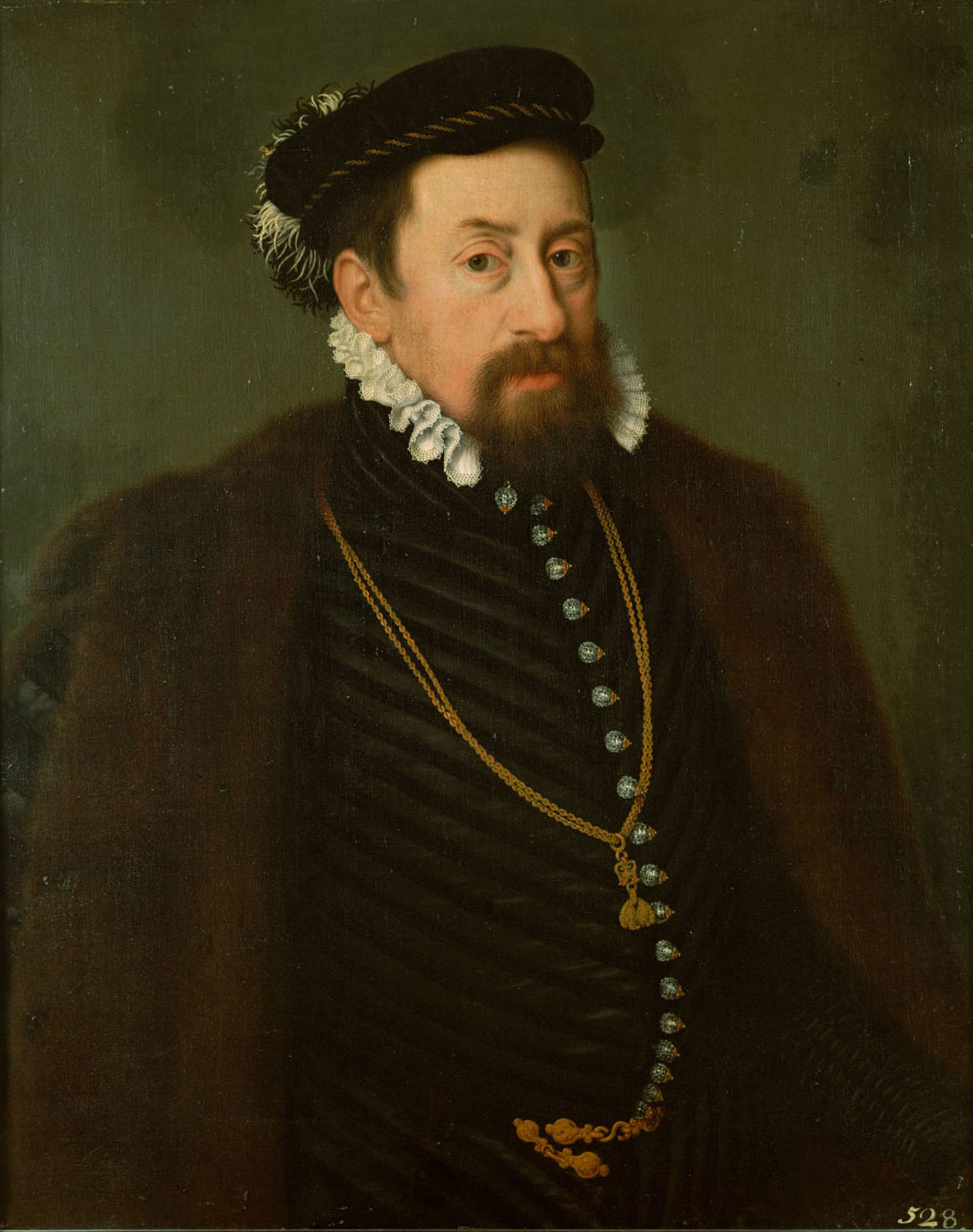
Maximilian II, Holy Roman Emperor

- January 19 – Hans Sachs, German Meistersinger (b. 1494)
- January 27 – Mizuno Nobumoto, Japanese shōgun
- February 10 – Wilhelm/Guilielmus Xylander, German classical scholar (b. 1532)
- February 12 – John Albert I, Duke of Mecklenburg (b. 1525)
- March 5 – Luis de Requesens y Zúñiga, Spanish governor of the Netherlands (b. 1528)
- March 18 – Johann Stössel, German theologian (b. 1524)
- May 14 – Tahmasp I, Shah of Persia (b. 1514)
- May 30 – Harada Naomasa, Japanese samurai
- June 30 – Franciscus Sonnius, Dutch counter-Reformation theologian (b. 1506)
- July 2 – Josias Simler, Swiss scholar (b. 1530)
- July 11 – Eleonora di Garzia di Toledo, Italian noble (d. 1553)
- July 16 – Isabella de' Medici, Italian noble (d. 1542)
- August 15 or August 22 – Bálint Bakfark, Hungarian composer and lutenist (b. 1507)
- August 27 – Titian, Italian painter (b. c. 1489)
- September 21 – Gerolamo Cardano, Italian mathematician, physician, astrologer and gambler (b. 1502)
- September 22 – Walter Devereux, 1st Earl of Essex (b. 1541)
- October 12 – Maximilian II, Holy Roman Emperor (b. 1527)
- October 14 – Konrad Heresbach, German Calvinist (b. 1496)
- October 26 – Frederick III, Elector Palatine, ruler from the house of Wittelsbach (b. 1515)
- November 4 – John Paulet, 2nd Marquess of Winchester (b. c. 1510)
- November 9 – Chamaraja Wodeyar IV, King of Mysore (b. 1507)
- date unknown
  - Paula Vicente, Portuguese artist, musician and writer (b. 1519)
- probable
  - Anthony More, Dutch portrait painter (b. 1512)
  - Nicola Vicentino, Italian music theorist and composer (b. 1511)

1577

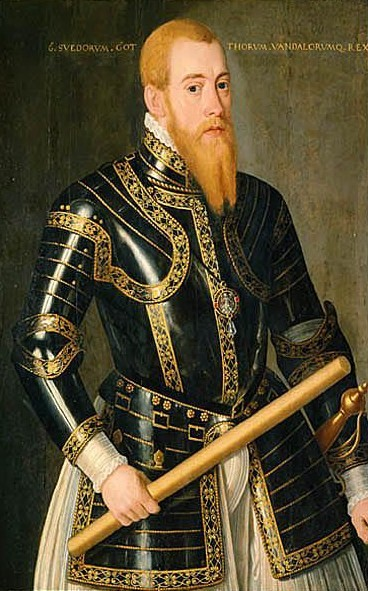
Eric XIV of Sweden

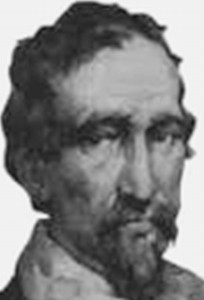
Saint Cuthbert Mayne

- January 23 – Nicolas, Duke of Mercœur, Roman Catholic bishop (b. 1524)
- February – Adam von Bodenstein, Swiss alchemist and physician (b. 1528)
- February 26 – King Eric XIV of Sweden (b. 1533)
- March 23 – Charles II, Margrave of Baden-Durlach (b. 1529)
- April 13 – Konrad Hubert, German theologian and hymnwriter (b. 1507)
- May – Richard Aertsz, Dutch painter (b. 1482)
- May 5 – Viglius, Dutch statesman (b. 1507)
- May 31 – García Álvarez de Toledo, 4th Marquis of Villafranca, Spanish noble and admiral (b. 1514)
- June 4 – Alvise I Mocenigo, Doge of Venice (b. 1507)
- June 7 – Daniel, Count of Waldeck (b. 1530)
- June 12 – Orazio Samacchini, Italian painter (b. 1532)
- July 23 – Scipione Rebiba, Italian cardinal (b. 1504)
- July 26 – Blaise de Lasseran-Massencôme, seigneur de Montluc, Marshal of France (b. 1502)
- August 12 – Thomas Smith, English scholar and diplomat (b. 1513)
- September 7 – Infanta Maria of Guimarães (b. 1538)
- September 27 – Diego de Covarrubias y Leyva, Spanish jurist and archbishop of Cuenca (b. 1512)
- October 3 – Henry IX, Count of Waldeck (b. 1531)
- October 7 – George Gascoigne, English poet (b. c. 1525)
- October 10 – Maria of Portugal, Duchess of Viseu (b. 1521)
- November 19 – Matsunaga Hisahide, Japanese warlord (b. 1508)
- November 29 – Cuthbert Mayne, English saint (b. 1543)
- December 4 – Achilles Gasser, German physician and astrologer (b. 1505)
- December 18 – Anna of Saxony, princess consort of Orange (b. 1544)

1578

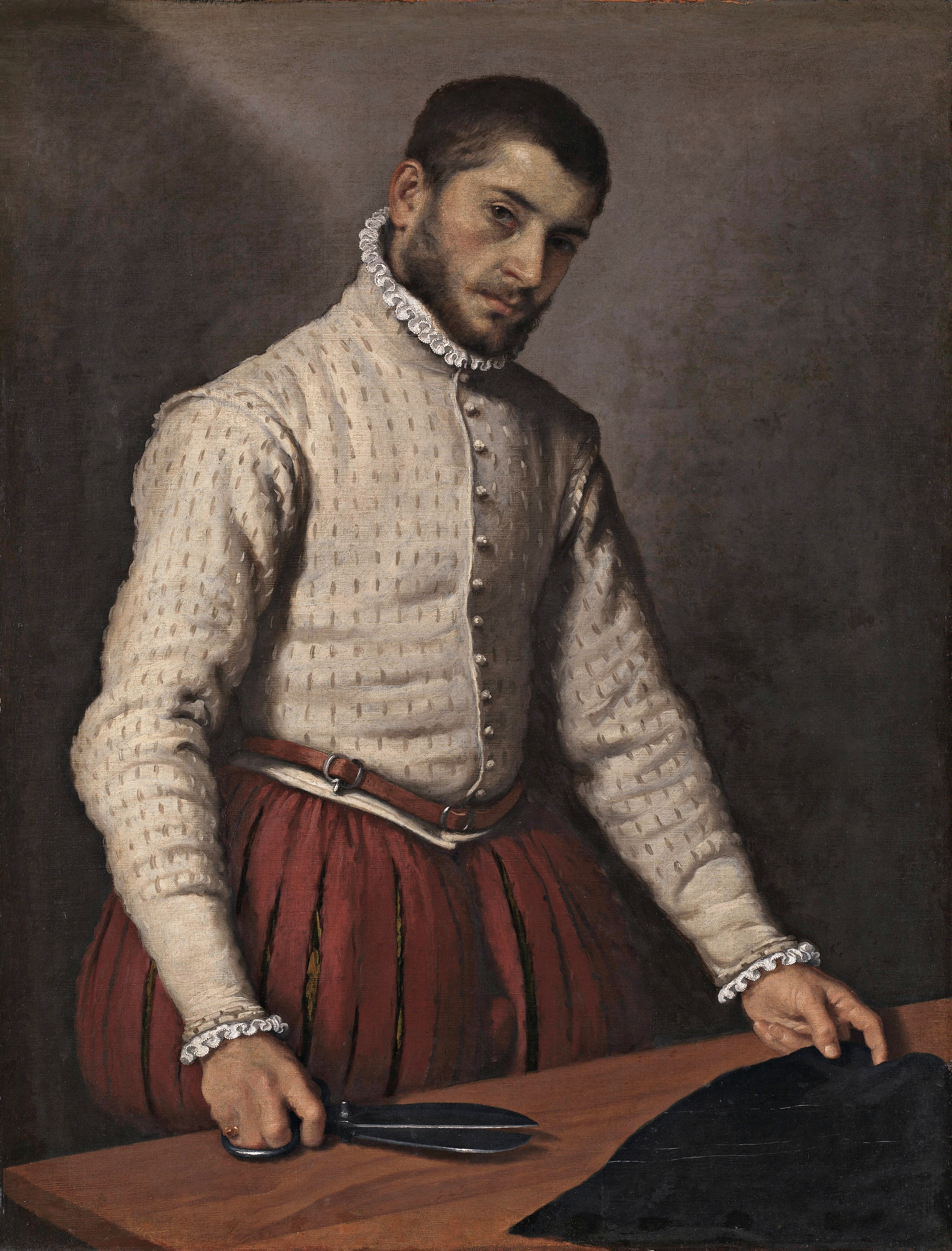
Giovanni Battista Moroni

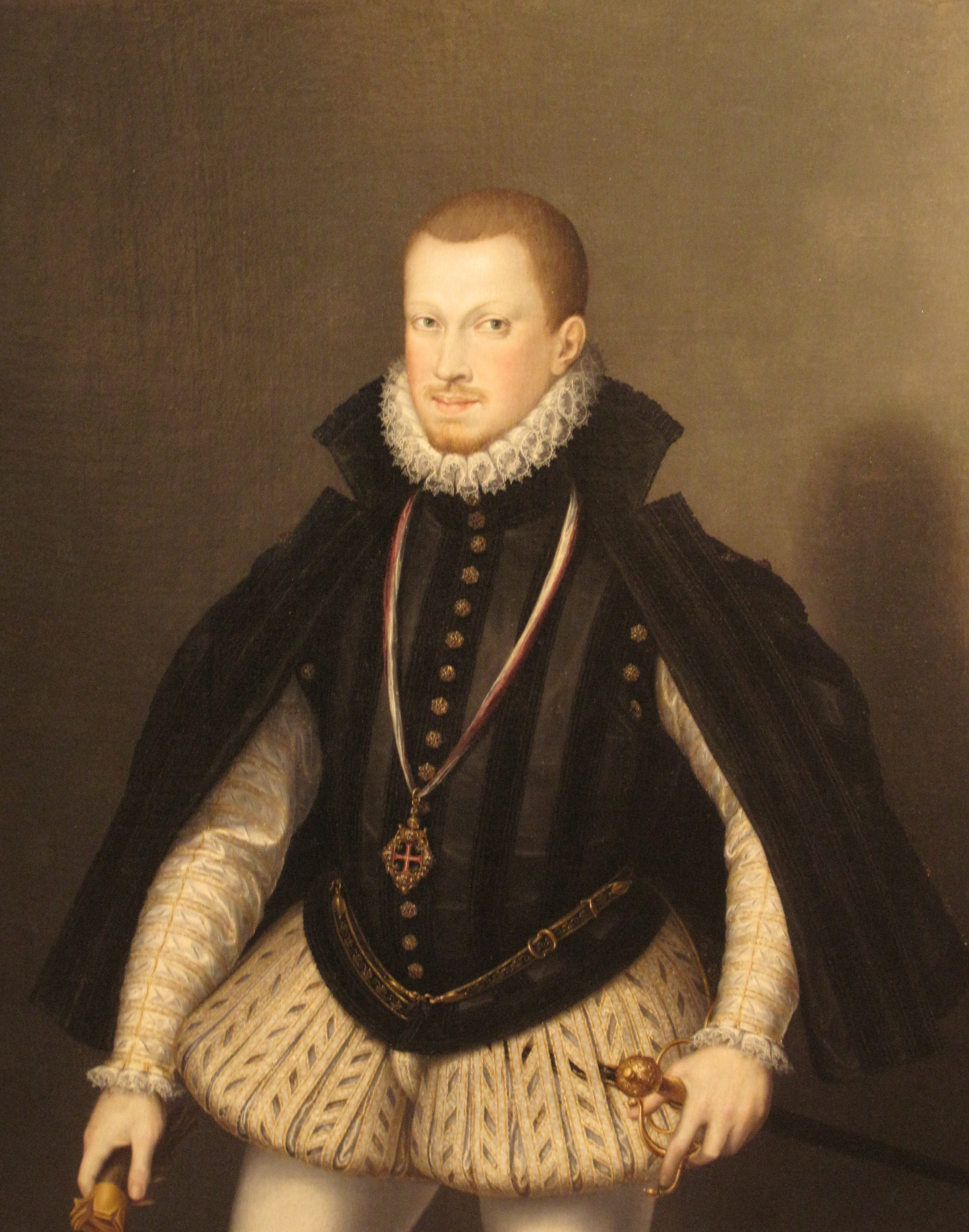
Sebastian of Portugal

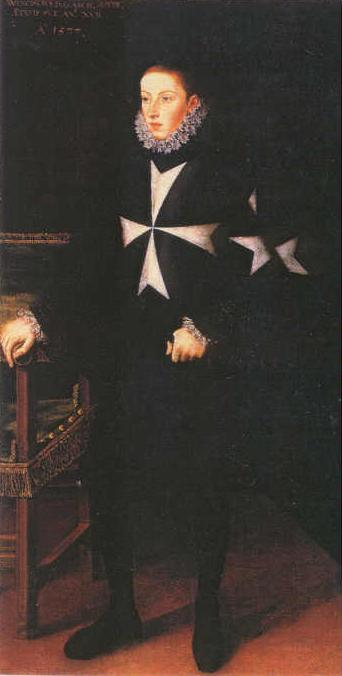
Archduke Wenceslaus of Austria

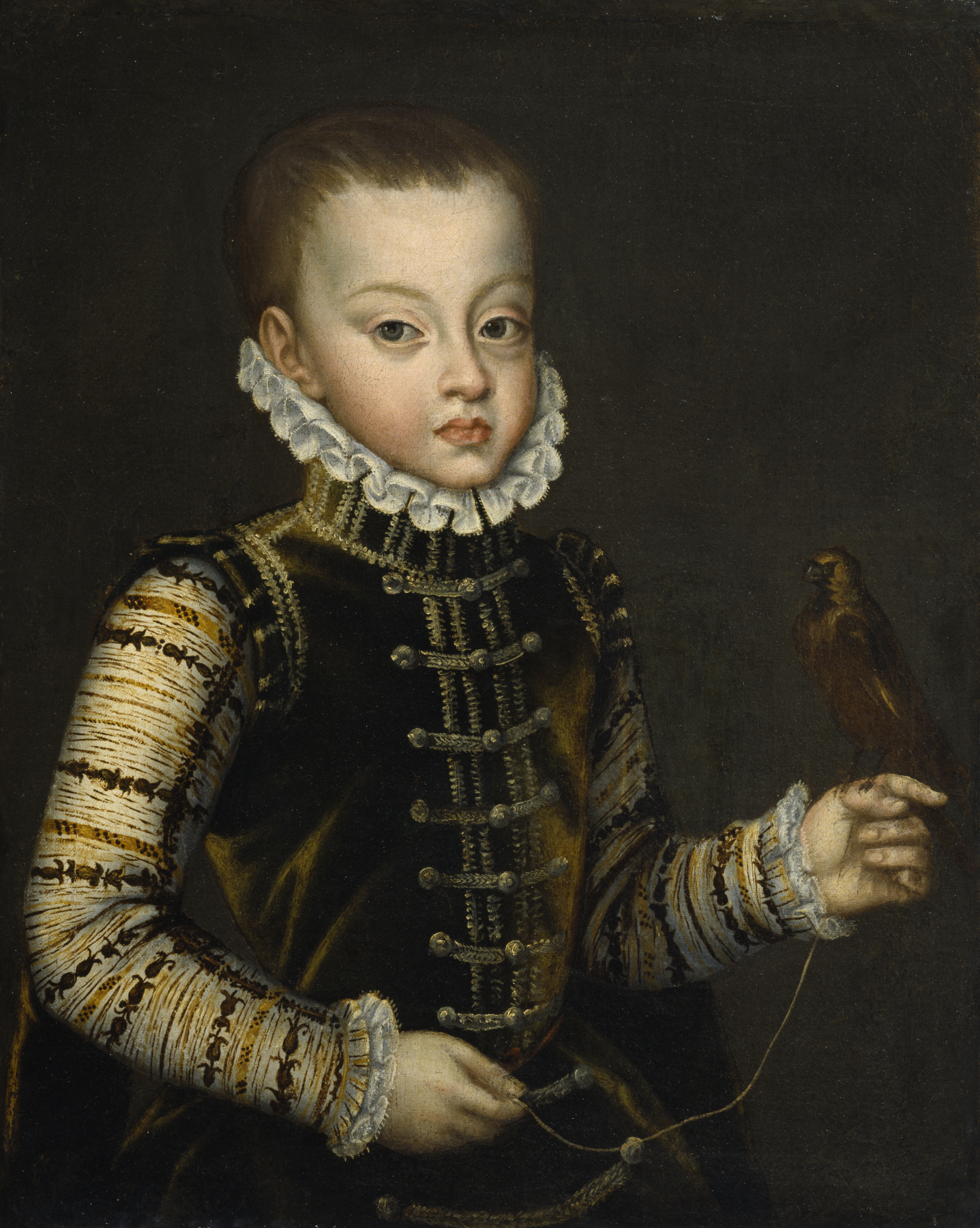
Ferdinand, Prince of Asturias

- January 5 – Giulio Clovio, Dalmatian painter (b. 1498)
- January 6 – Queen Inseong, Korean royal consort (b. 1514)
- January 25 – Mihrimah Sultan, Sultan Suleiman's daughter (b. 1522)
- February 5 or 1579 – Giovanni Battista Moroni, Italian painter (b. 1510)
- February 12 – Catherine of Austria, Queen of Portugal (b. 1507)
- March 3
  - Sebastiano Venier, Doge of Venice (b. 1496)
  - Michael Kantakouzenos Şeytanoğlu, Ottoman Greek magnate (b. 1510)
- March 7 – Margaret Douglas, Countess of Lennox (b. 1515)
- March 29
  - Arthur Champernowne, English admiral (b. 1524)
  - Louis I, Cardinal of Guise, French cardinal (b. 1527)
- April 2 – Marie Elisabeth of France, French princess (b. 1572)
- April 11 – Joanna of Austria, Grand Duchess of Tuscany, Austrian Archduchess (b. 1547)
- April 14 – James Hepburn, 4th Earl of Bothwell, consort of Mary, Queen of Scots (b. 1535)
- April 15 – Wolrad II, Count of Waldeck-Eisenberg (b. 1509)
- April 19 – Uesugi Kenshin, Japanese samurai and warlord (b. 1530)
- May 4 – Martin Eisengrein, German theologian (b. 1535)
- June 16 – Ioan Potcoavă, Russian Cossack ataman
- July 2 – Thomas Doughty, English explorer (executed)
- July 5 – Cristoforo Madruzzo, Italian Catholic cardinal (b. 1512)
- July 27 – Jane Lumley, English translator (b. 1537)
- August 4
  - King Sebastian of Portugal (b. 1554)
  - Thomas Stukley, English adventurer (b. 1525)
  - Abu Marwan Abd al-Malik I Saadi, King of Morocco
  - Abu Abdallah Mohammed II Saadi, King of Morocco
- August 8 – Amago Katsuhisa, Japanese nobleman (b. 1553)
- August 11 – Pedro Nunes, Portuguese mathematician (b. 1502)
- August 16 – Andrew Corbet, English landowner and politician (b. 1522)
- August 20 – Yamanaka Yukimori, Japanese samurai (b. 1545)
- September – Pierre Lescot, French architect (b. 1510)
- September 3 – Giulio della Rovere, Italian Catholic cardinal (b. 1533)
- September 22 – Archduke Wenceslaus of Austria (b. 1561)
- October 1 – Don John of Austria, military leader (b. 1547)
- October 12 – Cornelius Gemma, Dutch astronomer and astrologer (b. 1535)
- October 18 – Ferdinand, Prince of Asturias, Spanish prince (b. 1571)
- December 3 – Gonzalo II Fernández de Córdoba, Governor of the Duchy of Milan (b. 1520)
- December – Nicholas Heath, Archbishop of York and Lord Chancellor of England (b. 1501)
- date unknown – Sabina, Duchess of Bavaria (b. 1528)

1579

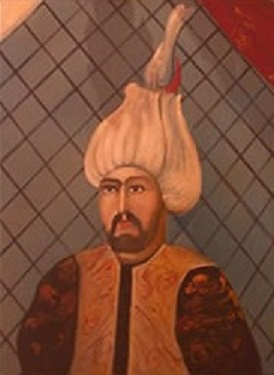
Sokollu Mehmed Pasha

- February 5 – Countess Palatine Helena of Simmern, Countess consort of Hanau-Münzenberg (1551-1561) (b. 1532)
- February 16 – Gonzalo Jiménez de Quesada, Spanish explorer (b. 1509)
- February 20 – Nicholas Bacon, English politician (b. 1509)
- March 12 – Alessandro Piccolomini, Italian humanist and philosopher from Siena (b. 1508)
- April 24 – John Stuart, 4th Earl of Atholl
- May 6 – François de Montmorency, French nobleman (b. 1530)
- May 20 – Isabella Markham, English courtier (b. 1527)
- June 17 – Johannes Stadius, Flemish astronomer, astrologer, mathematician (b. 1527)
- June 25 – Hatano Hideharu, Japanese samurai (b. 1541)
- July 3 – Edward Fitton, the elder, Irish politician (b. 1527)
- August 5 – Stanislaus Hosius, Polish Catholic cardinal (b. 1504)
- August 12 – Domenico Bollani, Bishop of Milan (b. 1514)
- October 11 – Sokollu Mehmed Pasha, Turkish Janissary and Grand Vizier (b. 1505)
- October 13 – William Drury, English politician (b. 1527)
- October 21 – Tanegashima Tokitaka, Japanese Daimyo (b. 1528)
- October 24 – Albert V, Duke of Bavaria (b. 1528)
- November 9 – Philip VI, Count of Waldeck (1567–1579) (b. 1551)
- November 15 – Francis David, Hungarian religious reformer (b. 1510)
- November 21 – Thomas Gresham, English merchant and financier (b. 1519)
- date unknown
  - Giovanni Battista Adriani, Italian historian (b. c. 1512)
  - Diego de Landa, Spanish Bishop of the Yucatán (b. 1524)
  - Hieronim Jarosz Sieniawski, Polish noble (b. 1516)
  - Barbara Thenn, Austrian merchant and Münzmeister (b. 1519)
  - William Whittingham, English Biblical scholar and religious reformer (b. 1524)
  - Voravongsa I, Laotian king of Lan Xang
- probable – Hans Staden, German adventurer (b. 1525)
