= 1574 in Sweden =

- Decades: 1550s; 1560s; 1570s; 1580s; 1590s
- See also: Other events of 1574; Timeline of Swedish history

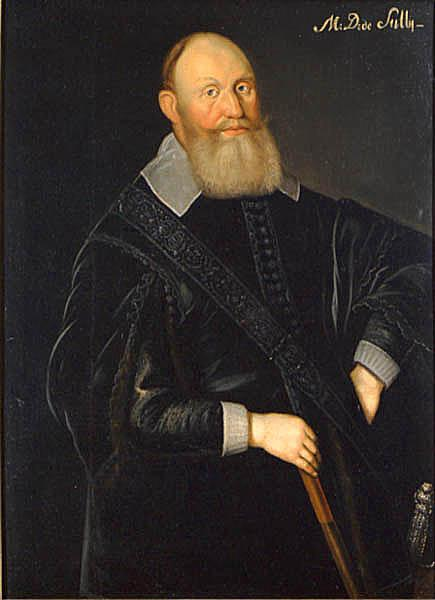
Carl Carlsson Gyllenhielm, by Jacob Heinrich Elbfas.

Events from the year 1574 in Sweden

== Incumbents ==
- Monarch – John III

== Events ==
- The deposed monarch, Eric XIV, is transferred to Örbyhus.
- The King's brother Magnus, Duke of Östergötland, is formally declared incapacitated because of his mental problems, and the administration of his Duchy is taken over by the monarch.
- The Catechism of Martin Luther is translated to Finnish by Paul Juusten.
- The Liturgical Battle begin.
- September - The Mornay Plot, a plot to assassinate John III of Sweden is discovered, headed by Charles de Mornay and implicating Charles Dancay, Hogenskild Bielke, Gustaf Banér, Pontus De la Gardie, Princess Elizabeth of Sweden, Princess Cecilia of Sweden, and Duke Charles.
- Dissolution of Sko Abbey: the last nuns, however, benefit from a state pension until at least 1588.

== Births ==
- - Carl Gyllenhielm, soldier and politician (died 1650)

== Deaths ==
- 4 September – Charles de Mornay, court official, diplomat and royal favorite (b. 1514)
