= 1576 in Sweden =

- Decades: 1550s; 1560s; 1570s; 1580s; 1590s
- See also: Other events of 1576; Timeline of Swedish history

- Years in Sweden: 1573 1574 1575 1576 1577 1578 1579
- Centuries: 15th century · 16th century · 17th century
- Decades: 1540s 1550s 1560s 1570s 1580s 1590s 1600s
- Years: 1573 1574 1575 1576 1577 1578 1579

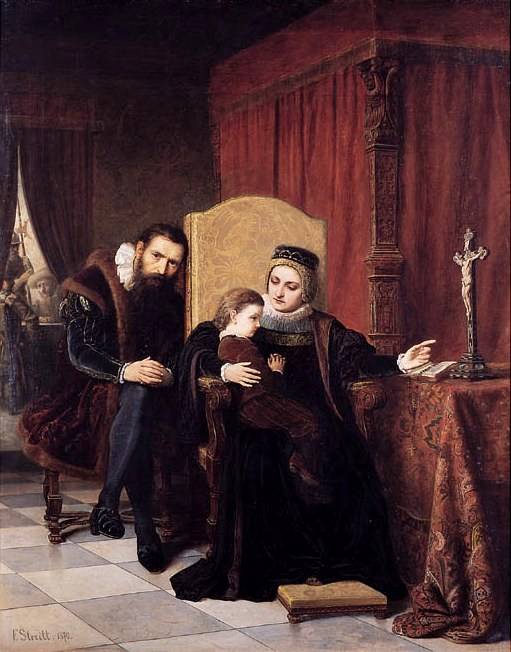
Franciszek Streitt - Katarzyna Jagiellonka

Events from the year 1576 in Sweden

== Incumbents ==
- Monarch – John III

== Events ==
- Foundation of the controversial Catholic academy Collegium Regium Stockholmense under Laurentius Nicolai in Stockholm, which provokes the Protestants.
- The 1576 Plot is exposed.

== Births ==
- - Jesper Mattson Cruus af Edeby, soldier and politician (died 1622)
