= 1570 =

1570 in various calendars
- Gregorian calendar: 1570; MDLXX
- Ab urbe condita: 2323
- Armenian calendar: 1019; ԹՎ ՌԺԹ
- Assyrian calendar: 6320
- Balinese saka calendar: 1491–1492
- Bengali calendar: 976–977
- Berber calendar: 2520
- English Regnal year: 12 Eliz. 1 – 13 Eliz. 1
- Buddhist calendar: 2114
- Burmese calendar: 932
- Byzantine calendar: 7078–7079
- Chinese calendar: 己巳年 (Earth Snake); 4267 or 4060 — to — 庚午年 (Metal Horse); 4268 or 4061
- Coptic calendar: 1286–1287
- Discordian calendar: 2736
- Ethiopian calendar: 1562–1563
- Hebrew calendar: 5330–5331
- Hindu calendars
- Vikram Samvat: 1626–1627
- Shaka Samvat: 1491–1492
- Kali Yuga: 4670–4671
- Holocene calendar: 11570
- Igbo calendar: 570–571
- Iranian calendar: 948–949
- Islamic calendar: 977–978
- Japanese calendar: Eiroku 13 / Genki 1 (元亀元年)
- Javanese calendar: 1489–1490
- Julian calendar: 1570; MDLXX
- Korean calendar: 3903
- Minguo calendar: 342 before ROC 民前342年
- Nanakshahi calendar: 102
- Thai solar calendar: 2112–2113
- Tibetan calendar: ས་མོ་སྦྲུལ་ལོ་ (female Earth-Snake); 1696 or 1315 or 543 — to — ལྕགས་ཕོ་རྟ་ལོ་ (male Iron-Horse); 1697 or 1316 or 544

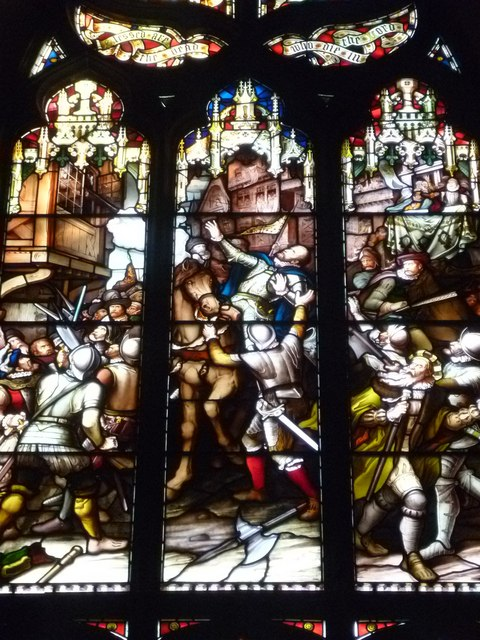
January 11: The Earl of Moray, regent of Scotland, is fatally wounded by a gunshot fired from a window as he is riding through Lithlingow (depiction at stained-glass window at St. Giles Church in Edinburgh)

Abraham Ortelius publishes the first modern atlas.

1570 (MDLXX) was a common year starting on Sunday in the Julian calendar.

== Events ==
=== January–March ===
- January 8 – Ivan the Terrible begins the Massacre of Novgorod.
- January 23 – The assassination of Scottish regent James Stewart, 1st Earl of Moray, by James Hamilton, the first known shooting of a national leader, throws Scotland into civil war. Having loaded a carbine rifle and carried it into the Linlithgow home of his uncle, the Archbishop of St Andrews, Hamilton stands at an upstairs window overlooking the street where Moray will ride by on horseback as part of cavalcade. Once Moray comes into range, Hamilton fires and fatally wounds the regent for King James VI.
- February 8 – An estimated 8.3 magnitude earthquake occurs in Concepción, Chile.
- February 5 – Venus occults Jupiter; this will next happen in 1818.
- February 25 – Pope Pius V excommunicated Queen Elizabeth I of England with the papal bull Regnans in Excelsis.
- March 28 – The ambassador of the Ottoman Sultan Selim II goes before the governing Council of the Venetian Republic and requests that Venice surrender the island of Cyprus. The Council rejects the demand and prepares to go to war with the Ottoman Empire.

=== April–June ===
- April 7 – In Scotland, Colin Campbell of Glenorchy receives permission from the Regent, the Earl of Morton, to execute the chief of Clan Gregor, his son-in-law Gregor Roy MacGregor, and carries out MacGregor's beheading at Balloch in front of the Earl of Atholl.
- April 27 – Pope Pius V excommunicates Queen Elizabeth I of England, and all persons who show allegiance to her, with the bull Regnans in Excelsis.
- May 20 – Abraham Ortelius publishes the first modern atlas, Theatrum Orbis Terrarum, in Antwerp.
- May 24 – Battle of Manila: The Spanish, led by Martín de Goiti, defeat the forces of Rajah Sulayman.
- June 10 – The Kingdom of Livonia is established.

=== July–September ===
- July 3 – The Ottoman conquest of Cyprus begins as more than 350 Ottoman ships and over 60,000 troops land near Larnaca and then march toward the Cypriot capital, Nicosia.
- July 14 – Pope Pius V issues Quo primum, promulgating the 1570 edition of the Roman Missal.
- July 22
  - Thomson Snell & Passmore is founded in England, the oldest law firm in operation.
  - The siege of Nicosia by the Ottoman Empire begins in Cyprus and lasts for seven weeks.
- July 30 (28th day of 6th month of Genki 1) – Battle of Anegawa: The allied forces of Oda Nobunaga and Tokugawa Ieyasu defeat the combined forces of the Azai and Asakura clans.
- August 8 – The Peace of Saint-Germain ends the Third War of Religion in France. Again, the Huguenots are promised religious freedom and political autonomy.
- August 16 – The Treaty of Speyer is signed between John Sigismund Zápolya, Prince of Transylvania and Maximilian II, King of Hungary.
- September 9 – Nicosia falls to the Turks under the command of General Lala Mustafa Pasha. After the Ottomans breach the walls, the Venetian defenders are massacred and the women and boys are sold into slavery.
- September 10 – A party of ten Spanish Jesuit missionaries land on the Virginia Peninsula of North America to establish the Ajacán Mission, which will be massacred in February 1571.
- September 25 (26th day of 8th month of Genki 1) – The 10-year-long Ishiyama Hongan-ji War begins in Japan as Oda Nobunaga stages simultaneous attacks on two fortresses (Ishiyama Hongan-ji and Nagashima) of the Ikkō-ikki faction near Osaka.

=== October–December ===
- October 3 – Princess Anna of Austria arrives in Spain to become the Queen Consort of Spain as the bride of her uncle King Philip of Spain, whom she had married by proxy on May 4. Having traveled through the Netherlands, she asks King Philip to spare the life of the rebel Floris of Montmorency, but the King arranges the strangulation of Floris on October 14.
- November 17 – A major earthquake strikes the Italian city of Ferrara at 3:00 in the morning local time, destroying 40 percent of the buildings in the city, but causing only 171 deaths. After the initial shocks, a sequence of aftershocks continue for four years, with over 2,000 in the period from November 1570 to February 1571.
- December 13 – The Treaty of Stettin ends the Northern Seven Years' War.

=== Date unknown ===
- Spanish conquistador Juan de Salcedo (in the service of Miguel López de Legazpi) begins the conquest of the Kingdom of Maynila.
- Construction of the original Catedral Nuestra Señora de La Asunción, the oldest church in Venezuela, begins.
- The Whitechapel Bell Foundry is known to be in existence in London. By 2017, when it closes its premises in Whitechapel, it will be the oldest manufacturing company in Great Britain.
- Andrea Palladio publishes I quattro libri dell'architettura in Venice.
- Volcanic eruption in the Santorini caldera begins.
- The Andean population of the Viceroyalty of Peru reaches 1.3 million.

== Births ==
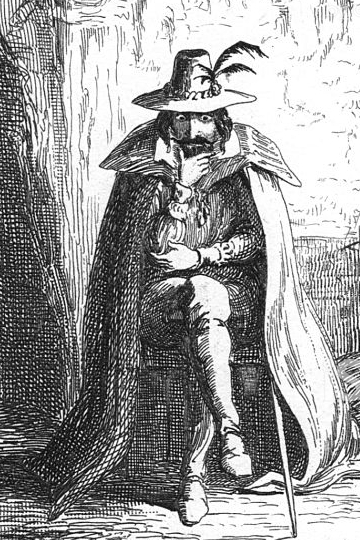
Guy Fawkes

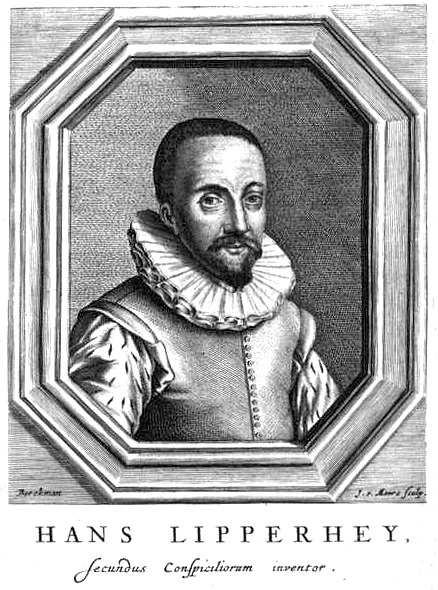
Hans Lippershey

- January 1 – Dorothea of Brunswick-Lüneburg, Spouse of Charles I, Count Palatine of Zweibrücken-Birkenfeld (d. 1649)
- January 19 – Wolfgang Hirschbach, German legal scholar (d. 1620)
- March 25 – Henry Lennard, 12th Baron Dacre, English baron and politician (d. 1616)
- April 13 – Guy Fawkes, English conspirator (d. 1606)
- May 8 – Tamás Esterházy, Hungarian writer (d. 1616)
- May 22 – Johann II, Duke of Saxe-Weimar, German duke (d. 1605)
- June 7 – Sultan Murad Mirza, Mughal prince (d. 1599)
- June 13 – Paul Peuerl, German organist (d. 1625)
- August 10 – Philip, Duke of Holstein-Gottorp (1587–1590) (d. 1590)
- August 19 – Salamone Rossi, Italian violinist and composer (d. 1630)
- August 21 – Christopher, Duke of Brunswick-Harburg, co-ruler of Brunswick-Lüneburg-Harburg (1603–1606) (d. 1606)
- August 22 – Franz von Dietrichstein, German Catholic bishop (d. 1636)
- August 31 – Gustav of Saxe-Lauenburg, German noble (d. 1597)
- October 3 – George Coke, British bishop (d. 1646)
- October 4 – Péter Pázmány, Hungarian cardinal and statesman (d. 1637)
- October 7 – Volkert Overlander, Dutch mayor (d. 1630)
- November 1 – Phineas Pett, English shipwright and member of the Pett Dynasty (d. 1647)
- November 15 – Francesco Curradi, Italian painter (d. 1661)
- November 20 – Giovanni Battista Agucchi, Italian churchman, papal diplomat, and writer on art theory (d. 1632)
- November 26 – Christian, Duke of Schleswig-Holstein-Sonderburg-Ærø (1622–1633) (d. 1633)
- November 28 – James Whitelocke, English judge (d. 1632)
- December 7 – Richard Cecil, English politician (d. 1633)
- December 29 – Wilhelm Lamormaini, Luxembourgian theologian (d. 1648)
- date unknown
  - Diego Aduarte, Prior of Manila (d. 1637)
  - Robert Aytoun, Scottish poet (d. 1638)
  - Ebba Bielke, Swedish baroness and conspirator (d. 1618)
  - John Cooper, English composer and lutenist (d. 1626)
  - Simon Grahame, Scottish-born adventurer (d. 1614)
  - Nakagawa Hidenari, Japanese daimyō (d. 1612)
  - Hans Lippershey, Dutch lensmaker (d. 1619)
  - Asprilio Pacelli, Italian Baroque composer (d. 1623)
  - Girolamo Rainaldi, Italian architect (d. 1655)
  - Claudia Sessa, Italian composer (d. 1617/19)
  - Katharina Henot, German General Postmaster and alleged witch (d. 1627)
  - Urszula Meyerin, politically influential Polish courtier (d. 1635)
  - Christina Rauscher, German official and critic of witchcraft persecutions (d. 1618)
  - John Dackombe, Chancellor of the Duchy of Lancaster (d. 1618)

== Deaths ==
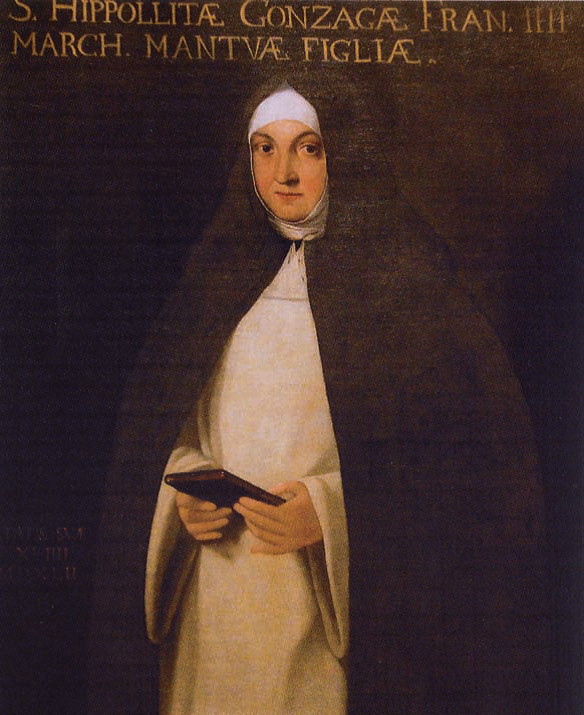
Ippolita Gonzaga

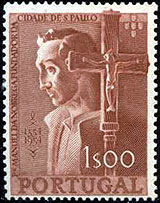
Manuel da Nobrega

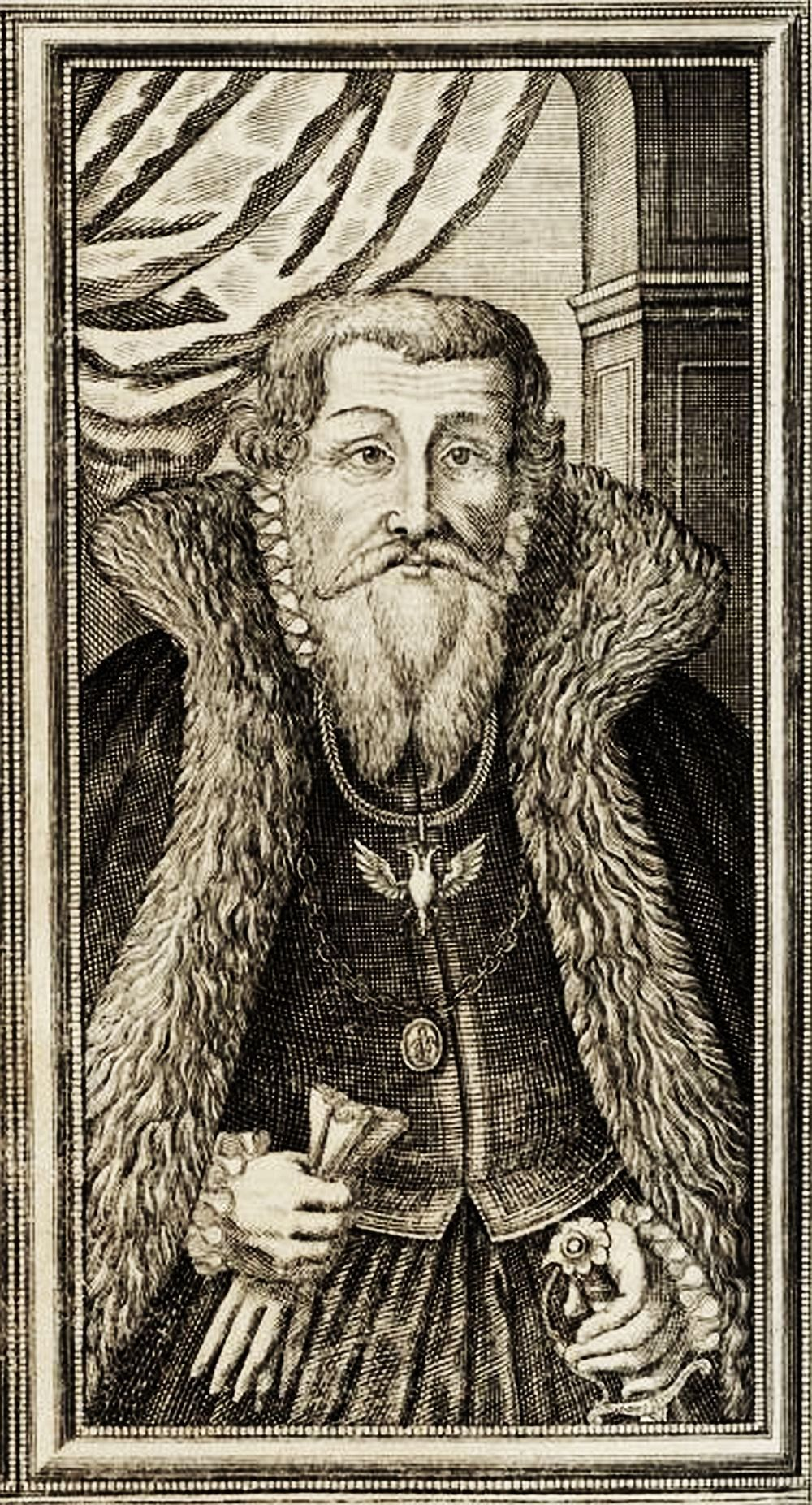
Duke Frederick III of Legnica

- January 8 – Philibert de l'Orme, French architect (b. 1510)
- February – Henry Balnaves, Scottish politician and religious reformer (b. 1512)
- January 23 – James Stewart, 1st Earl of Moray, regent of Scotland (assassinated) (b. c.1531)
- February 13 – Eleonora Gonzaga, Duchess of Urbino, politically active Italian duchess (b. 1493)
- February 20 – Johannes Scheubel, German mathematician (b. 1494)
- March 1 – Bernhard VII, Prince of Anhalt-Zerbst (b. 1540)
- March 16 – Ippolita Gonzaga, Italian nun (b. 1503)
- April 13 – Daniele Barbaro, Italian architect (b. 1514)
- July 3 – Aonio Paleario, Italian humanist and reformer (executed) (b. c. 1500)
- July 25 – Ivan Mikhailovich Viskovatyi, Russian diplomat
- August 4 – Marie Catherine Gondi, French court official (b. c. 1500)
- September 11 – Johannes Brenz, German theologian and Protestant Reformer (b. 1499)
- October 1 – Frans Floris, Flemish painter (b. 1520)
- October 18 – Manuel da Nóbrega, Portuguese Jesuit missionary in Brazil (b. 1517)
- October 20
  - João de Barros, Portuguese historian (b. 1496)
  - Francesco Laparelli, Italian architect (b. 1521)
- November – Jacques Grévin, French dramatist (b. 1539)
- November 21 – Ruxandra Lăpușneanu, Moldavian regent (b. 1538)
- November 27 – Jacopo Sansovino, Italian sculptor and architect (b. 1486)
- December 15 – Frederick III of Legnica, Duke of Legnica (b. 1520)
- date unknown
  - François Bonivard, Swiss patriot and historian (b. 1496)
  - Francesco Primaticcio, Italian painter, architect, and sculptor (b. 1504)
  - Tomás de Santa María, Spanish music theorist
  - Agostino Gallo, Italian agronomist (b. 1499)
