= 1574 =

1574 in various calendars
- Gregorian calendar: 1574; MDLXXIV
- Ab urbe condita: 2327
- Armenian calendar: 1023; ԹՎ ՌԻԳ
- Assyrian calendar: 6324
- Balinese saka calendar: 1495–1496
- Bengali calendar: 980–981
- Berber calendar: 2524
- English Regnal year: 16 Eliz. 1 – 17 Eliz. 1
- Buddhist calendar: 2118
- Burmese calendar: 936
- Byzantine calendar: 7082–7083
- Chinese calendar: 癸酉年 (Water Rooster); 4271 or 4064 — to — 甲戌年 (Wood Dog); 4272 or 4065
- Coptic calendar: 1290–1291
- Discordian calendar: 2740
- Ethiopian calendar: 1566–1567
- Hebrew calendar: 5334–5335
- Hindu calendars
- Vikram Samvat: 1630–1631
- Shaka Samvat: 1495–1496
- Kali Yuga: 4674–4675
- Holocene calendar: 11574
- Igbo calendar: 574–575
- Iranian calendar: 952–953
- Islamic calendar: 981–982
- Japanese calendar: Tenshō 2 (天正２年)
- Javanese calendar: 1493–1494
- Julian calendar: 1574; MDLXXIV
- Korean calendar: 3907
- Minguo calendar: 338 before ROC 民前338年
- Nanakshahi calendar: 106
- Thai solar calendar: 2116–2117
- Tibetan calendar: ཆུ་མོ་བྱ་ལོ་ (female Water-Bird); 1700 or 1319 or 547 — to — ཤིང་ཕོ་ཁྱི་ལོ་ (male Wood-Dog); 1701 or 1320 or 548

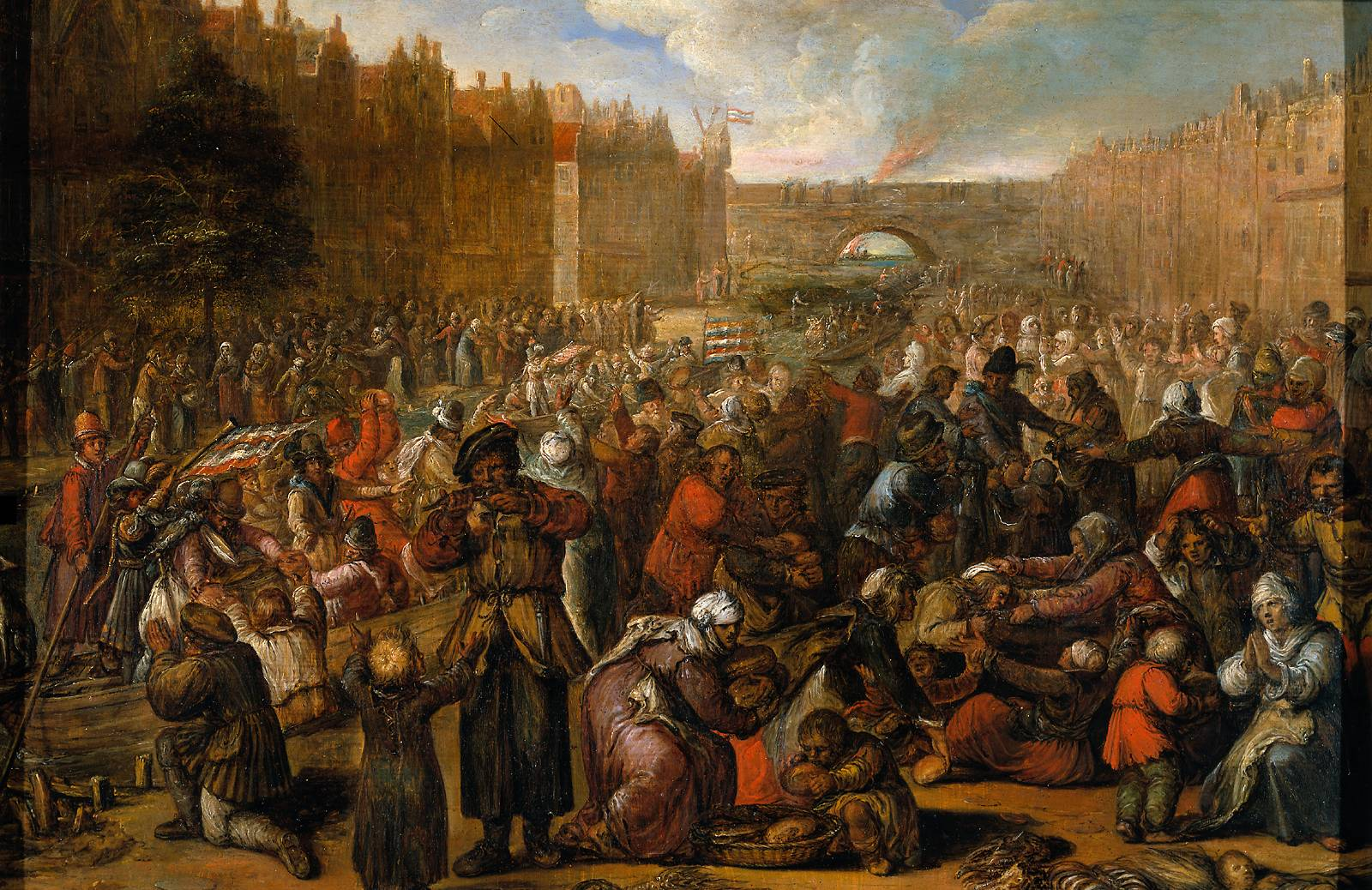
October 3: The Relief of Leiden.

Year 1574 (MDLXXIV) was a common year starting on Friday of the Julian calendar.

== Events ==
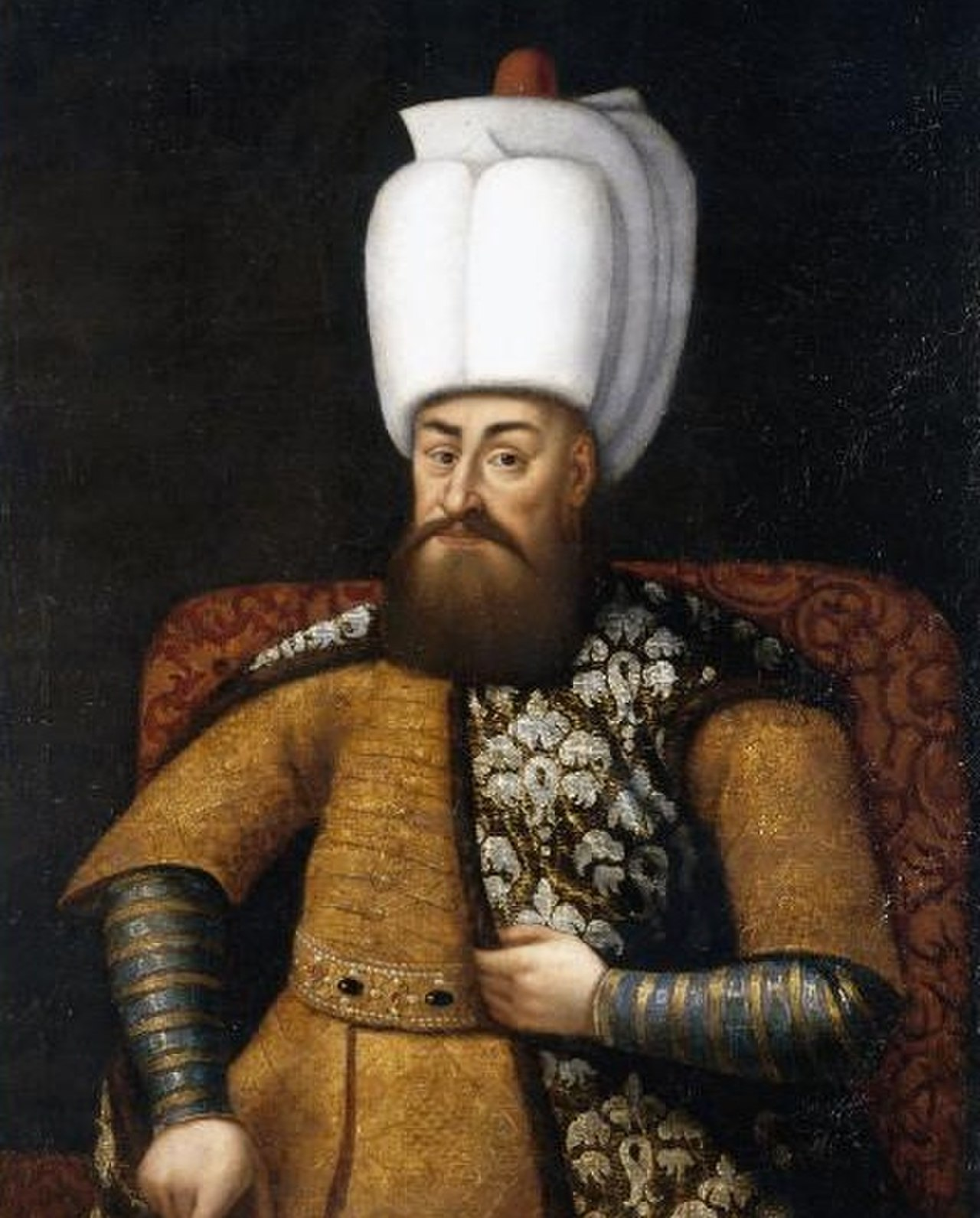
December: Murad III becomes Ottoman Emperor.

=== January–March ===
- January 22 – Mohammed II becomes the new Sultan of Morocco upon the death of his father, Abdallah al-Ghalib.
- January 27 – At Agra, Bhagwant Das becomes the new Maharaja of the Kingdom of Amber in what is now India's state of Uttar Pradesh, upon the death of his grandfather, the Raja Bharmal.
- January 29 – Off of the coast of the Netherlands, the Battle of the Scheldt is fought between the Spanish Fleet and a combined Dutch and English fleet of ships. The Spanish Navy loses 15 ships and 1,200 men are killed, wounded or captured.
- February – The fifth War of Religion against the Huguenots begins in France.
- March 2 – Swedish troops attack Wesenberg Castle in Estonia and lose at least 1,000 men in attempting to capture it from the Russian Army.
- March 17 – Within the Swedish Army, a fight between Scottish and German mercenaries is fought. By the end of the battle, several hundred Scots are dead, compared to 30 Germans.

=== April–June ===
- April 14 – Battle of Mookerheyde: Spanish forces under Sancho de Avila defeat the rebel forces of Louis of Nassau, who is killed.
- April – The fort of Narnala in the Deccan falls to the Ahmadnagar Sultanate, and with it the Berar sultanate is annexed by Ahmadnagar.
- May 30 – On the death of King Charles IX of France of a tubercular condition at the Château de Vincennes, he is succeeded by his brother King Henry of Poland, who becomes King Henry III of France. His mother, Catherine de' Medici, acts as Regent, until Henry arrives from Poland.
- June 10
  - Construction of The White Tower begins in the Czech Republic.
  - Manila, Philippines gains cityhood.

=== July–September ===
- July 12 – Selim II, Sultan of the Ottoman Empire, launches the attempt to reclaim Tunis from control of the Holy Roman Empire with more than 250 warships and 100,000 troops, and to restore North Africa to Muslim control.
- July 13 – In Berlin, John George, Elector of Brandenburg, orders the founding of the Evangelisches Gymnasium zum Grauen Kloster, which remains 450 years later as one of the most prestigious preparatory schools in Germany.
- July 26 – Kılıç Ali Pasha begins construction of an Ottoman fortress on the coastline of Morocco, directly across Andalusia in mainland Spain.
- August 24 – The Tunisian port of La Goulette falls to Ottoman troops after six weeks.
- August 30 – Guru Ram Das becomes the fourth of the Sikh gurus.
- September 13 – The last Holy Roman Imperial defenders surrender Tunis to the Ottoman General Cığalazade Yusuf Sinan Pasha.
- September – A plot to assassinate John III of Sweden is discovered, headed by Charles de Mornay and implicating Charles Dancay, Hogenskild Bielke, Gustaf Banér, Pontus De la Gardie, Princess Elizabeth of Sweden, Princess Cecilia of Sweden, and Duke Charles.

=== October–December ===
- October 3 – The city of Leiden, besieged by the Spanish, is relieved by a Sea Beggars fleet under Louis Boisot.
- November 22 – The Juan Fernández Islands in the South Pacific Ocean are discovered by Spanish sailor Juan Fernández.
- November 29 – Limahong and Juan de Salcedo quarrel during the Battle of Manila.
- December 15 – Selim II, the 50-year-old Sultan of the Ottoman Empire, is killed after becoming drunk, falling, and fracturing his skull on the floor of the Topkapi Palace.
- December 22 – Prince Murad bin-Selim of the Ottoman Empire completes the murders, by strangulation, of his four younger brothers, Süleyman, Abdüllah, Osman, and Cihangir.
- December 27 – Murad III, eldest son of Selim II, is formally enthroned as the Ottoman Sultan after eliminating his other brothers as rival claimants to the throne.

=== Undated ===
- Prince El-Mirza of Kakheti is defeated in his bid for the throne by his half-brother, Alexander II.
- The Liturgical Battle royal between the Reformation and Counter Reformation begins in Sweden, and continues until the Uppsala Synod of 1593.
- La Alameda, Seville, is laid out in Spain, as Europe's first public garden.

== Births ==
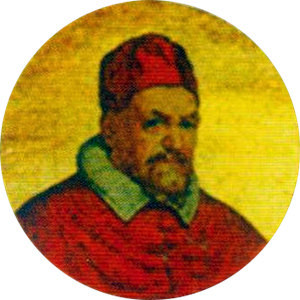
Pope Innocent X

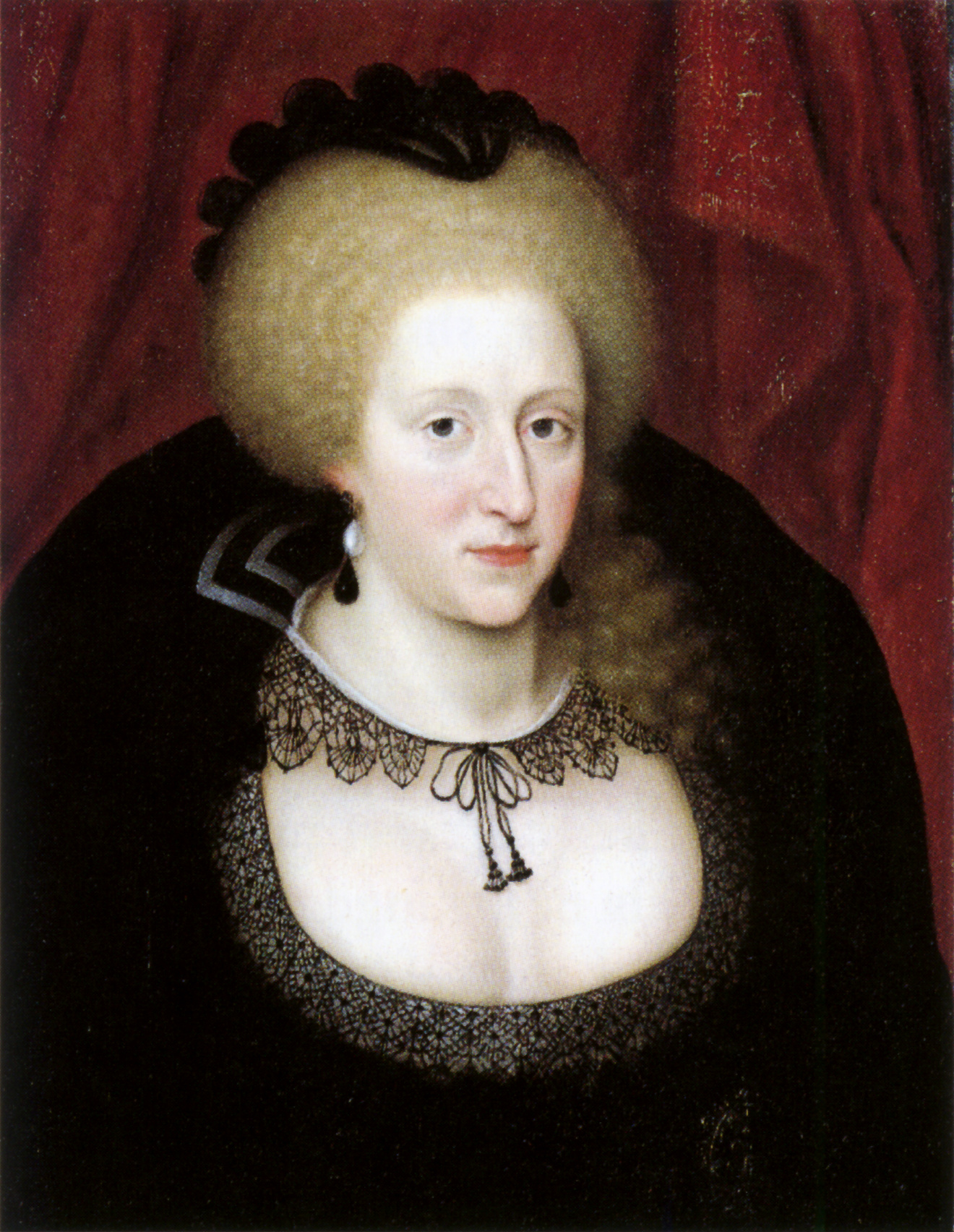
Anne of Denmark

- January 17 – Robert Fludd, English Rosicrucian and Paracelsian physicist (d. 1637)
- February 17 – Pedro Téllez-Girón, 3rd Duke of Osuna, Spanish nobleman and politician (d. 1624)
- March 4 – Carl Gyllenhielm, Swedish soldier and politician (d. 1650)
- March 5 – William Oughtred, English mathematician and Anglican minister (d. 1660)
- March 7 – John Wilbye, English composer (date of baptism) (d. 1638)
- April 27 – Philip Rubens, Flemish lawyer and older brother to painter Peter Paul Rubens (d. 1611)
- May 6 – Pope Innocent X (d. 1655)
- May 14
  - Daniel Dumonstier, French artist (d. 1646)
  - Francesco Rasi, Italian composer, singer, instrumentalist, poet (d. 1621)
- June 13 – Juan Alonso de Solis y Mendoza, Spanish Catholic prelate, Bishop of Puerto Rico (1635–1640) (d. 1640)
- June 13 – Wilhelm Kettler, Duke of Courland (d. 1640)
- June – Richard Barnfield, English poet (d. 1627)
- July 1 – Joseph Hall, English bishop and satirist (d. 1656)
- July 2 – Dorothea Maria of Anhalt, Duchess consort of Saxe-Weimar (1602–1605) (d. 1617)
- July 10 – Clara Maria of Pomerania-Barth, German noble (d. 1623)
- July 23 – Balthasar I Moretus, Flemish printer (d. 1641)
- August 2 – Sir Richard Beaumont, 1st Baronet, English politician (d. 1631)
- August 7 – Robert Dudley, styled Earl of Warwick, English explorer and geographer (d. 1649)
- August 28 – Frederick IV, Duke of Brunswick-Lüneburg (1636–1648) (d. 1648)
- August 30 – Albert Szenczi Molnár, Hungarian translator (d. 1634)
- September 6 – Luis Sotelo, Spanish Franciscan friar who died as a martyr in Japan (d. 1624)
- September 18 – Claudio Achillini, Italian philosopher, theologian, mathematician, poet, jurist (d. 1640)
- September 29 – Ludovic Stewart, 2nd Duke of Lennox, Scottish nobleman and politician (d. 1624)
- September – Thomas Gataker, English clergyman and theologian (d. 1654)
- October 25 – François de Sourdis, French Catholic cardinal (d. 1628)
- November 4 – Erycius Puteanus, Dutch humanist, philologist (d. 1646)
- November 5 – Charlotte de La Marck, French duchess (d. 1594)
- November 10 – Archduchess Maria Christina of Austria, Austrian archduchess (d. 1621)
- November 30 – Frederick of Solms-Rödelheim, imperial chamberlain, war and Obrist (d. 1649)
- December 8 – Maria Anna of Bavaria, Archduchess of Inner Austria (d. 1616)
- December 10 – Mikołaj Łęczycki, Polish Jesuit (d. 1653)
- December 12
  - Adam Wenceslaus, Duke of Cieszyn (d. 1617)
  - Anne of Denmark, queen of James VI and I of Scotland and England (d. 1619)
- December 15 – Samuel Besler, Polish composer (d. 1625)
- date unknown
  - John Day, English dramatist (d. 1640)
  - Wilhelm Kinsky, Bohemian nobleman (d. 1634)
  - Claudio Pari, Sicilian composer
  - Feng Menglong, Chinese poet (d. 1645)

== Deaths ==
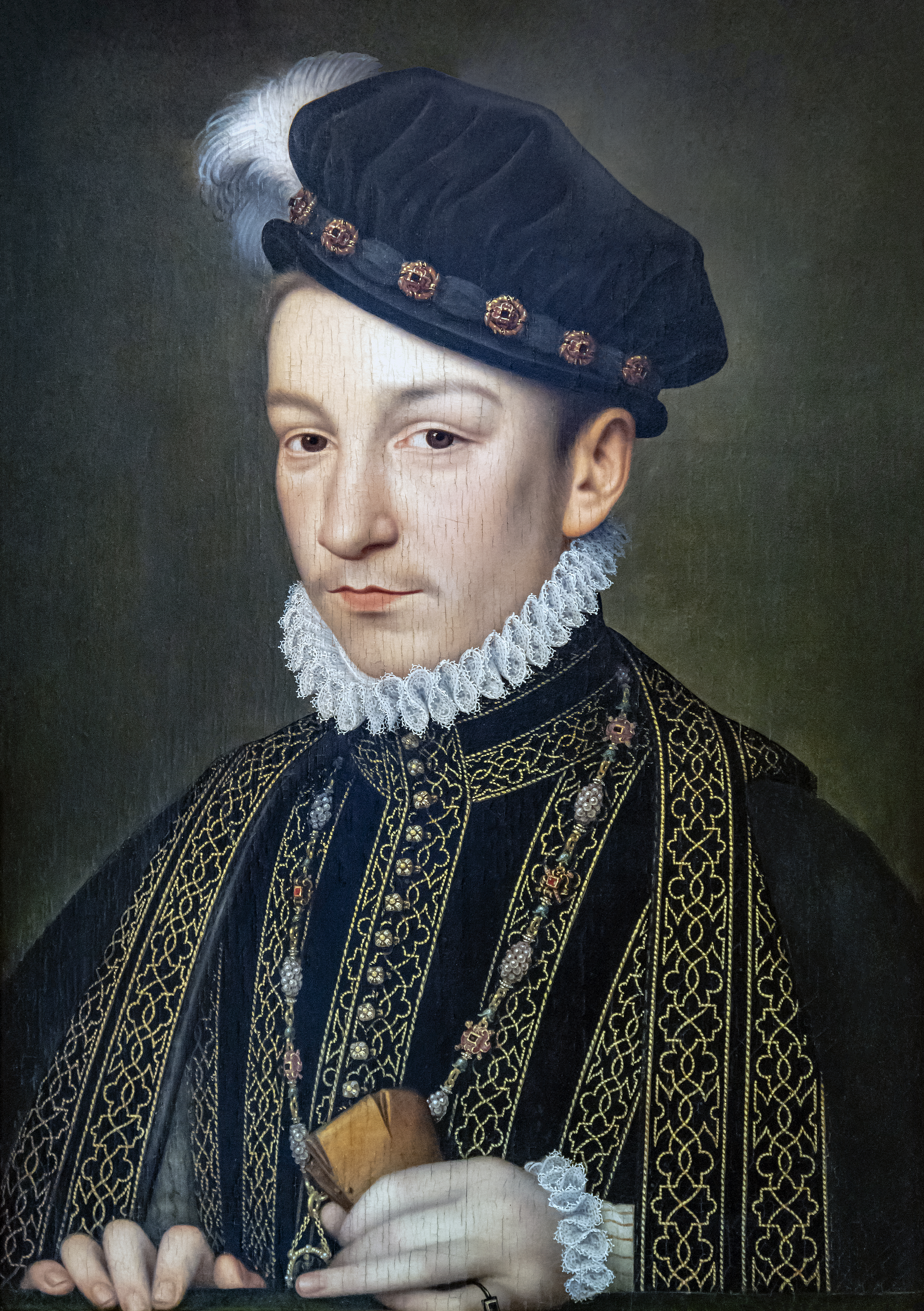
Charles IX of France

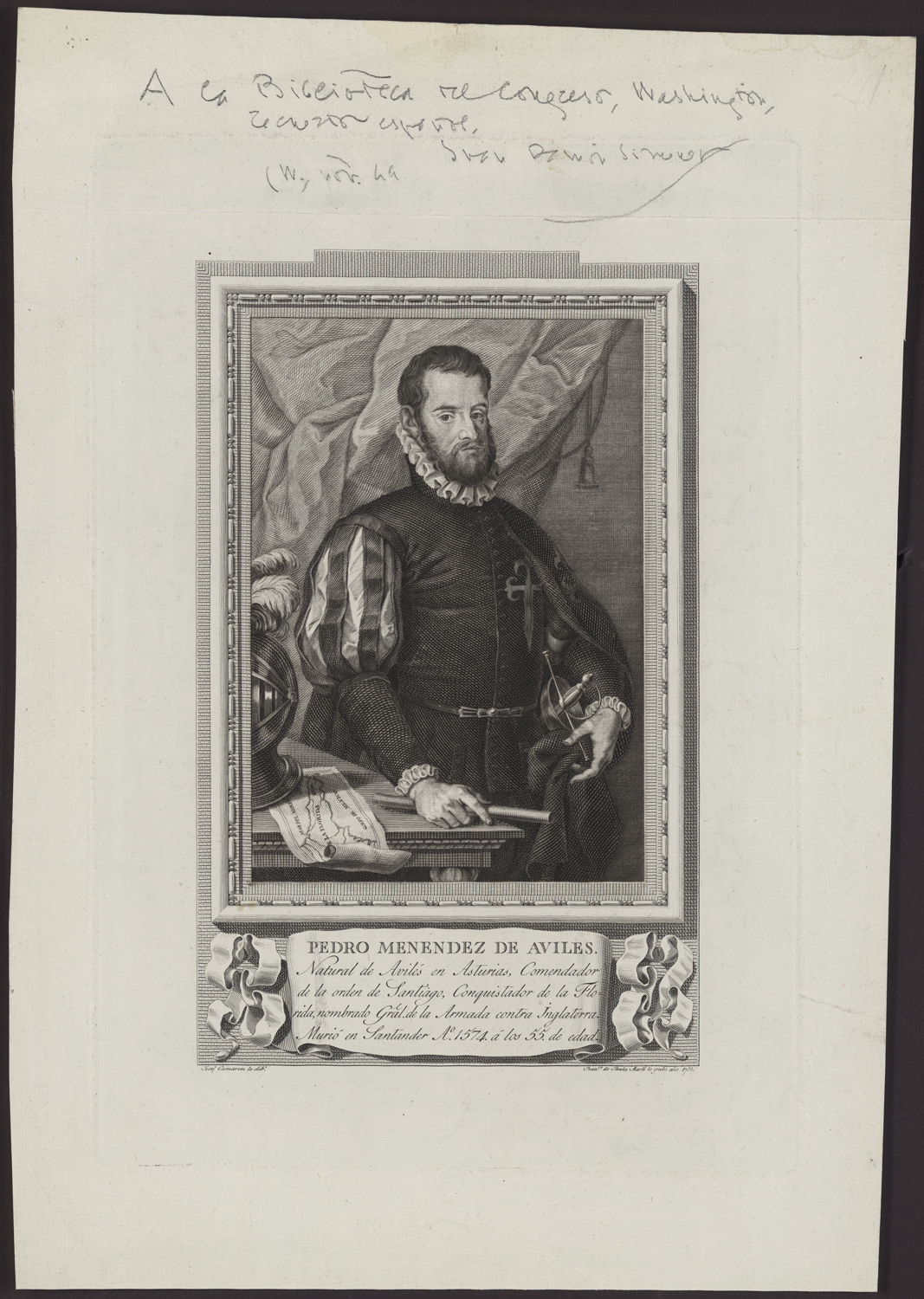
Pedro Menendez de Aviles

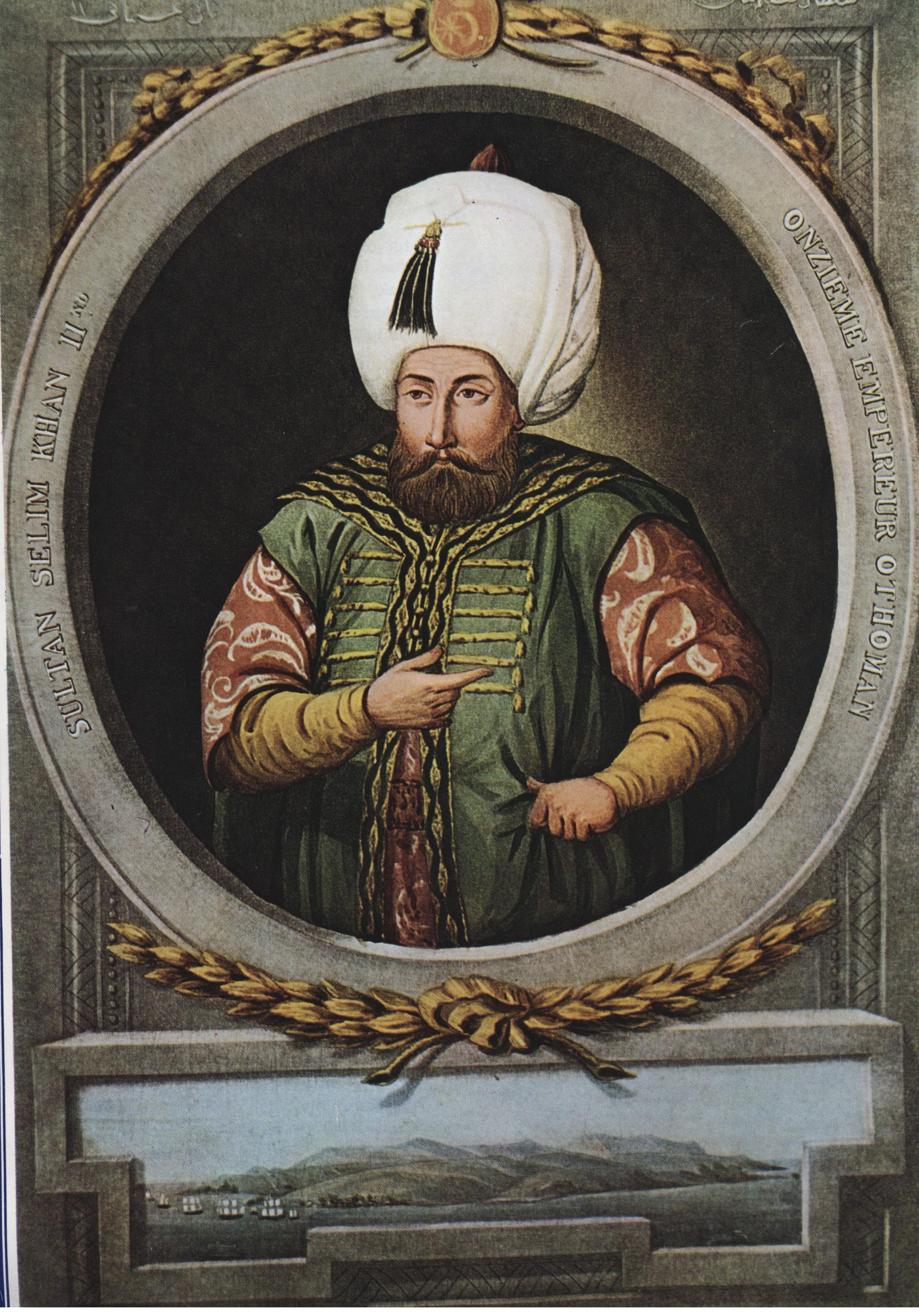
Sultan Selim II

- January 26 – Martin Helwig, German cartographer of Silesia (b. 1516)
- January 30 – Damião de Góis, Portuguese philosopher (b. 1502)
- March 4 – Anna II, Princess-Abbess of Quedlinburg, German noblewoman, reigning from 1516 until her death (b. 1504)
- March 27 – Takeda Nobutora, Japanese warlord (b. 1494)
- April 14 – Louis of Nassau, Dutch general (b. 1538)
- April 17 – Joachim Camerarius, German classical scholar (b. 1500)
- April 21 – Cosimo I de' Medici, Grand Duke of Tuscany (b. 1519)
- April 30 – Joseph Boniface de La Molle, Provençale lover of Marguerite de Valois (b. 1530)
- May 14 – Guru Amar Das, third Sikh Guru (b. 1479)
- May 3 – Giovanni Ricci, Italian Catholic cardinal (b. 1498)
- May 30 – King Charles IX of France (b. 1550)
- June 12 – Renée of France, French princess (b. 1510)
- June 14 – John III the Terrible, Voivode of Moldavia (b. 1521)
- June 26 – Gabriel de Lorges, Count of Montgomery, captain of the Scottish Guard of Henry II of France (b. 1530)
- June 27 – Giorgio Vasari, Italian painter and architect (b. 1511)
- July 26 – Birgitte Gøye, Danish county administrator, lady in waiting, landholder and educator (b. 1511)
- August 23 – Ebussuud Efendi, Ottoman Grand Mufti (b. 1490)
- August 27 – Bartolomeo Eustachi, Italian anatomist
- September 1 – Louis, Count of Stolberg, German noble (b. 1505)
- September 4 – Charles de Mornay, Swedish (originally French) court official, diplomat and royal favorite (b. 1514)
- September 15 – Margaret of France, Duchess of Berry (b. 1523)
- September 17 – Pedro Menéndez de Avilés, Spanish admiral and explorer (b. 1519)
- September 26 – Elisabeth of Anhalt-Zerbst, Abbess of Gernrode and Frose, Countess of Barby-Mühlingen (b. 1545)
- September 28 – Guidobaldo II della Rovere, Duke of Urbino, Italian condottiero (b. 1514)
- October 1 – Maarten van Heemskerck, Dutch painter (b. 1498)
- November 23 – John III, Count of Nassau-Saarbrücken, German noble (b. 1511)
- November 28 – Georg Major, German Protestant theologian (b. 1502)
- December 4 – Georg Joachim Rheticus, German mathematician and cartographer (b. 1514)
- December 12 – Selim II, Ottoman Sultan (b. 1524)
- December 25 – Charles, Cardinal of Lorraine (b. 1524)
- date unknown
  - Hans Eworth, Flemish painter (b. 1520)
  - Martin de Goiti, Spanish conquistador
