= 1575 in Sweden =

- Decades: 1550s; 1560s; 1570s; 1580s; 1590s
- See also: Other events of 1575; Timeline of Swedish history

Events from the year 1575 in Sweden

== Incumbents ==
- Monarch – John III

== Events ==
- The Dutch pharmacist Anthonius Busenius is authorized to take part in Slottet Tre Kronor's medicine supply and move it outside the city to be able to sell medicine to the public. This counts as the first royal pharmacy privilege in Sweden, and the first pharmacy was founded at Stortorget in Stockholm.
