= White Tower =

White Tower may refer to:

== Geography and history ==
- White Tower (Tower of London), a central tower in the Tower of London, United Kingdom
- White Tower or Tower of the Forty Martyrs, Mamluk minaret of the White Mosque, Ramla, Israel
- White Tower of Thessaloniki, a monument and museum in Greece
- White Tower of Tehran, Iran
- White Tower of Tsarskoye Selo, landscape architecture element in Tsarskoye Selo, Russia
- White Tower (Yekaterinburg), constructivist former water tower in Yekaterinburg, Russia
- White Tower (Brixen), bell tower dated back to the 15th century, Brixen, Italy
- The White Tower (British Columbia), a Canadian Rockies mountain named after the tower in the Tower of London
- The White Tower (Czech Republic), a 16th-century tower in the city of Hradec Králové
- Lotrščak Tower, a 13th-century fortress in Zagreb, Croatia nicknamed "the White Tower"
- Sarkel, a fortress in Russia renamed in 965 A.D. to Belaya Vezha (White Tower)
- Tower of Kamyanyets, often called Belaya Vezha (White Tower)
- Aħrax Tower, a tower in Malta often called Torri l-Abjad (White Tower)

== Literature ==
- The White Tower (Ullman novel), a 1945 novel by James Ramsey Ullman
- Shiroi Kyotō (The White Tower), a 1965 novel by Toyoko Yamasaki
- The White Tower (Johnston novel), a 2003 novel by Dorothy Johnston
- The White Tower of Minas Tirith in J. R. R. Tolkien's Middle-earth
- White Tower (The Wheel of Time), the headquarters of the Aes Sedai in the Wheel of Time series

== Film and television ==
- The White Tower (film), a 1950 film based on the 1945 novel
- Shiroi Kyotō (The White Tower), a 1966 Japanese film based on the 1965 novel of the same name
- White Tower (film), a 2004 Chinese film
- White Tower (TV series), a 2007 South Korean TV drama based on the 1965 Japanese novel

== Other uses ==
- White Tower Hamburgers, a restaurant chain

== See also ==
- White Minaret
- Weißer Turm (disambiguation)
