= 1514 =

1514 in various calendars
- Gregorian calendar: 1514; MDXIV
- Ab urbe condita: 2267
- Armenian calendar: 963; ԹՎ ՋԿԳ
- Assyrian calendar: 6264
- Balinese saka calendar: 1435–1436
- Bengali calendar: 920–921
- Berber calendar: 2464
- English Regnal year: 5 Hen. 8 – 6 Hen. 8
- Buddhist calendar: 2058
- Burmese calendar: 876
- Byzantine calendar: 7022–7023
- Chinese calendar: 癸酉年 (Water Rooster); 4211 or 4004 — to — 甲戌年 (Wood Dog); 4212 or 4005
- Coptic calendar: 1230–1231
- Discordian calendar: 2680
- Ethiopian calendar: 1506–1507
- Hebrew calendar: 5274–5275
- Hindu calendars
- Vikram Samvat: 1570–1571
- Shaka Samvat: 1435–1436
- Kali Yuga: 4614–4615
- Holocene calendar: 11514
- Igbo calendar: 514–515
- Iranian calendar: 892–893
- Islamic calendar: 919–920
- Japanese calendar: Eishō 11 (永正１１年)
- Javanese calendar: 1431–1432
- Julian calendar: 1514; MDXIV
- Korean calendar: 3847
- Minguo calendar: 398 before ROC 民前398年
- Nanakshahi calendar: 46
- Thai solar calendar: 2056–2057
- Tibetan calendar: ཆུ་མོ་བྱ་ལོ་ (female Water-Bird); 1640 or 1259 or 487 — to — ཤིང་ཕོ་ཁྱི་ལོ་ (male Wood-Dog); 1641 or 1260 or 488

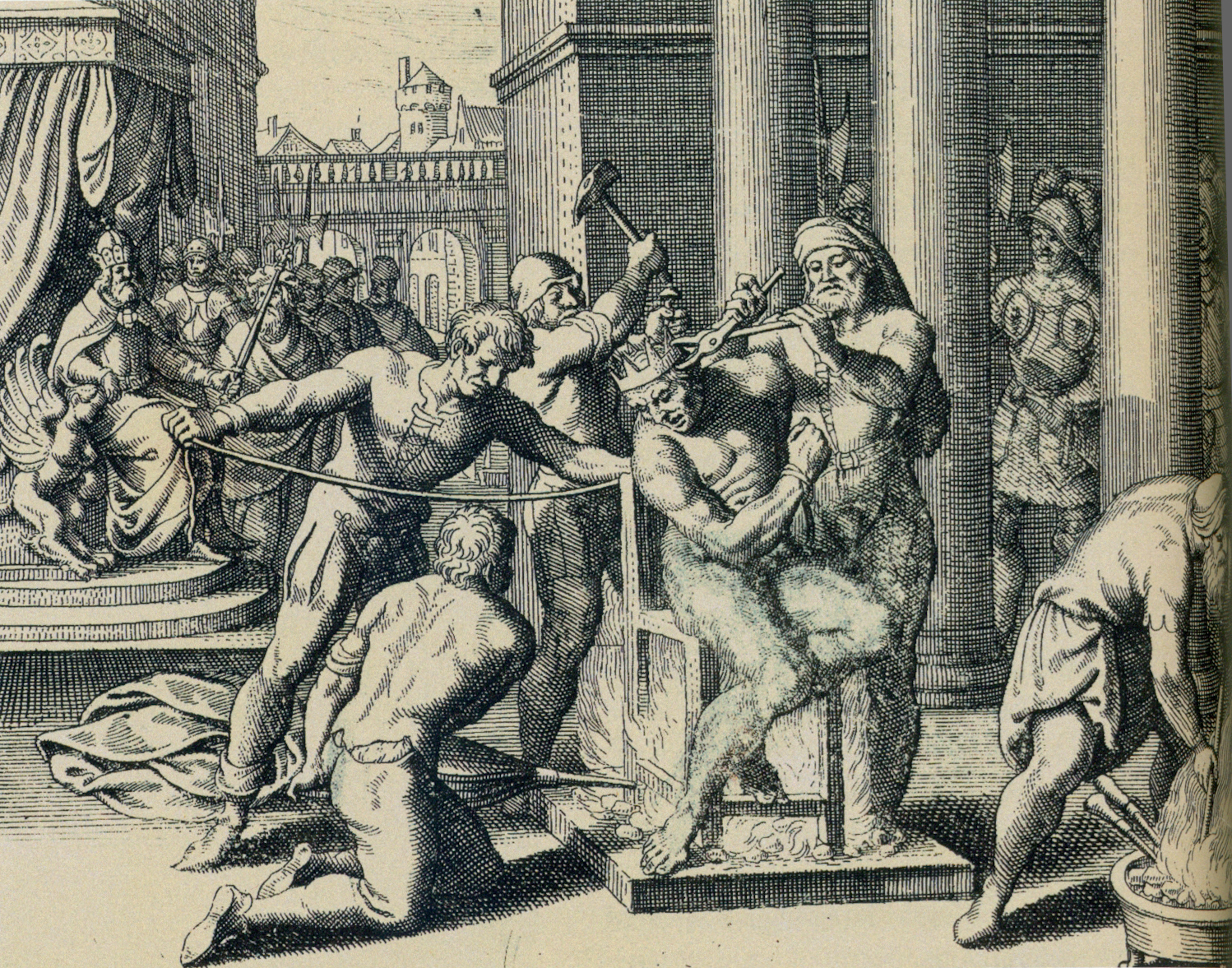
July 14: Six days of torture of Hungarian rebel leader György Dózsa begins, lasting until his death.

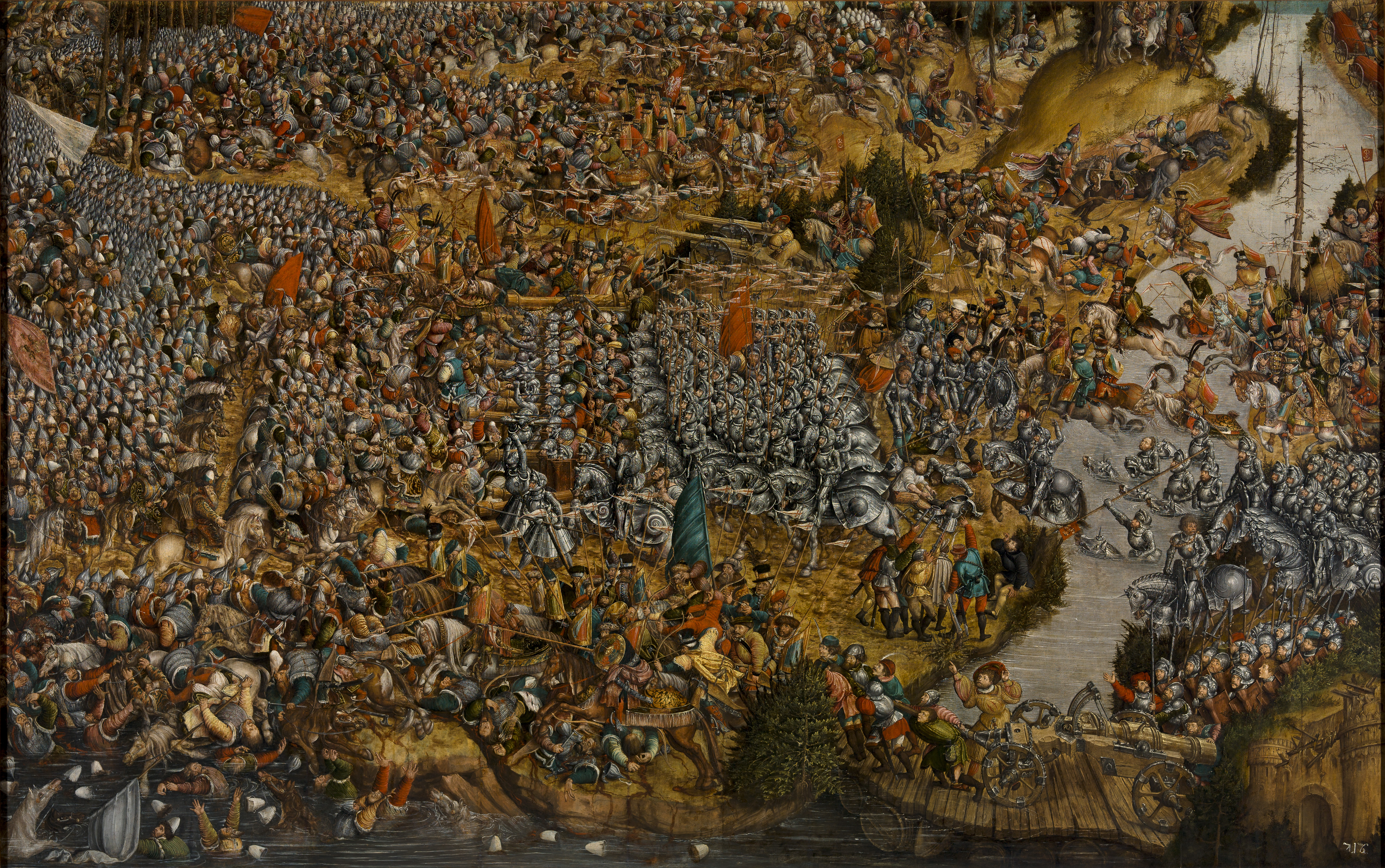
September 8: Poland and Lithuania defeat a much larger Russian force in the Battle of Orsha.

Year 1514 (MDXIV) was a common year starting on Sunday of the Julian calendar.

== Events ==
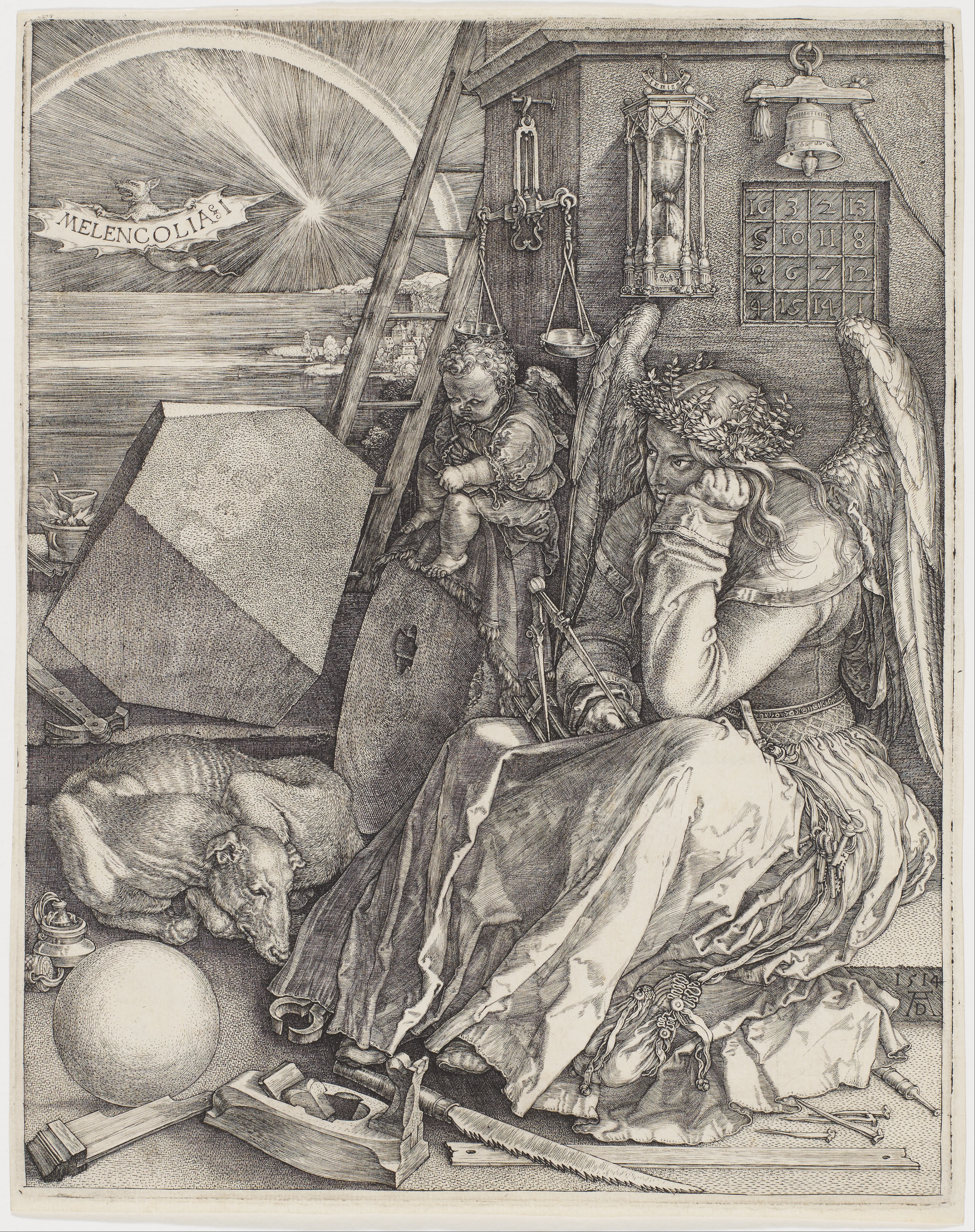
Albrecht Dürer creates engraving Melencolia I.

=== January–March ===
- January 10 – A great fire breaks out, in the Rialto of Venice.
- February 12 – War of the League of Cambrai: In what is now the Italian region of Friuli-Venezia Giulia, Giacomo Badoer, administrator of the Republic of Venice, orders a retreat from the approaching forces of the Holy Roman Empire, abandoning Udine, Cividale and Cormons and falling back on Sacile.
- March 12 – A huge exotic embassy sent by King Manuel I of Portugal to Pope Leo X arrives in Rome, including Hanno, an Indian elephant.
- March 13 – Louis XII of France makes peace with Maximilian I, Holy Roman Emperor.

=== April–June ===
- April 29 – After a month of negotiations at Linz between the Holy Roman Empire and the Kingdom of Denmark, representatives of the two nations sign an alliance agreement, to be secured by the marriage of the Emperor's 13-year-old daughter Isabella, to the new King of Denmark, Christian II, along with payment of a dowry to King Christian of 250,000 Rhenish gulden, equivalent to $118,000,000 USD 500 years later.
- May 2 – The Poor Conrad peasant revolt against Ulrich, Duke of Württemberg begins in Beutelsbach.
- May 15 – The earliest printed edition of Saxo Grammaticus' 12th century Scandinavian history Gesta Danorum, edited by Christiern Pedersen from an original found near Lund, is published as Danorum Regum heroumque Historiae, by Jodocus Badius in Paris.
- June 13 – Henry Grace à Dieu, at over 1,000 tons the largest warship in the world at this time, built at the new Woolwich Dockyard in England, is dedicated.

=== July–September ===
- July 14 – The Hungarian rebel leader György Dózsa is defeated in battle at Temesvár in Transylvania in Hungary (now Timișoara in Romania, and tortured over a period of six days until his death. Condemning Dózsa's ambition to be king, Hungary's monarch Stephen VIII Báthory orders that Dózsa be tied to an iron throne over a fire, then forced to wear a red-hot metal crown.
- July 20 – King Christian II is crowned King of Norway in Oslo. This coronation will be the last in Norway for 304 years until the crowning of King Karl III Johan in 1818.
- August 1 – Vasili III of Russia captured Smolensk from Grand Duchy of Lithuania.
- August 7 – King Henry VIII of England concludes an independent peace treaty with France in the War of the League of Cambrai, negotiated by Thomas Wolsey.
- August 13 – Mary Tudor, sister of King Henry VIII, is married by proxy to France's King Louis XII in accordance with the August 7 peace treaty.
- August 23 – Battle of Chaldiran: Selim I crushes the Persian army of Shah Ismail I.
- September 7 – The Ottoman Army, commanded by the Sultan Selim I, arrives at Tabriz, capital of Safavid Iran and accepts the surrender of Shah Ismail.
- September 8 – Forces of the Grand Duchy of Lithuania and the Kingdom of Poland, backed by Belarusians, with 30,000 troops, defeat the larger Russian army of the Grand Duchy of Moscow (80,000 soldiers) in the Battle of Orsha.
- September 15 – Thomas Wolsey is appointed Archbishop of York in England.

=== October–December ===
- October 9 – King Louis XII marries Mary Tudor (sister of King Henry VIII) at Abbeville, as part of the Kingdom of England's peace with France.
- November 5 – Mary Tudor is formally crowned as the Queen consort of France.
- November 23 – King Henry VIII of summons the English Parliament, to assemble at Westminster on February 5.
- November 28 – Hersekzade Ahmed Pasha steps down as Grand vizier of the Ottoman Empire.
- December 4 – Juan Rodríguez de Fonseca and Pietro Martire d'Anghiera complete the first printed map of Central America as they record their data from the Pinzón–Solís voyage of 1508-1509.
- December 18 – Ottoman General Dukaginzade Ahmed Pasha is appointed by the Sultan Selim I as the new Grand Vizier, but serves for less than three months before he is removed and executed.
- December 29 – Giovanni Carlo Tramontano, Count of Matera, is assassinated in Matera, the day after demanding that the aristocracy and people of his realm pay 24,000 ducates in taxes to clear up his personal debts.

=== Date unknown ===
- Albrecht Dürer makes his famous engraving Melencolia I.
- Paolo Ricci (Camillo Renato) moves to Augsburg.
- Nicolaus Copernicus's Commentariolus is written by this date.

== Births ==
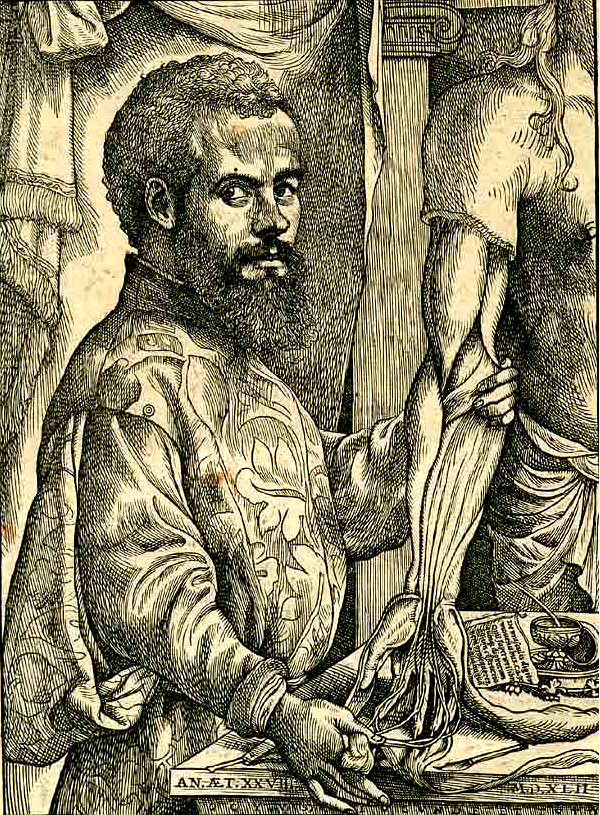
Andreas Vesalius

- January 1 – George Gordon, 4th Earl of Huntly, Scottish noble (d. 1562)
- January 23 – Hai Rui, Chinese official of the Ming Dynasty (d. 1587)
- January 27 – Bernardino Maffei, Italian Catholic cardinal (d. 1553)
- February 8 – Daniele Barbaro, Venetian churchman, diplomat and scholar (d. 1570)
- February 10 – Domenico Bollani, Bishop of Milan (d. 1579)
- February 16 – Georg Joachim Rheticus, Austrian cartographer and scientific instrument maker (d. 1574)
- February 22 – Tahmasp I, Shah of Iran (d. 1576)
- February 22 – Johannes Gigas, German theologian (d. 1581)
- February 26 – Otto Truchsess von Waldburg, German Catholic cardinal (d. 1573)
- March 8 – Amago Haruhisa, Japanese samurai and warlord (d. 1561)
- March 23 – Lorenzino de' Medici, Italian writer and assassin (d. 1548)
- April 2 – Guidobaldo II della Rovere, Duke of Urbino, Italian condottiero (d. 1574)
- April 5 – Joachim Mörlin, German bishop (d. 1571)
- April 30 – Alexander Stewart, Duke of Ross, Scottish prince (d. 1515)
- May 28 – Shimazu Takahisa, daimyō and fifteenth head of the Shimazu clan (d. 1571)
- June 16 – John Cheke, English classical scholar and statesman (d. 1557)
- August 29 – García Álvarez de Toledo, 4th Marquis of Villafranca, Spanish noble and admiral (d. 1577)
- September 12 – Philip, Duke of Mecklenburg, (d. 1557)
- September 20 – Philipp IV, Count of Hanau-Lichtenberg (d. 1590)
- September 24 – Prospero Santacroce, Italian Roman Catholic cardinal (d. 1589)
- October 7 – Queen Inseong, Korean royal consort (d. 1578)
- October 31 – Wolfgang Lazius, Austrian historian (d. 1565)
- November 29 – Andreas Musculus, German theologian (d. 1581)
- November 30 – Andreas Masius, German Catholic priest (d. 1573)
- December 31 – Andreas Vesalius, Flemish anatomist (d. 1564)
- date unknown
  - Hosokawa Harumoto, Japanese military leader (d. 1563)
  - George Gordon, 4th Earl of Huntly, Scottish nobleman (d. 1562)
  - Charles de Mornay, Swedish (originally French) court official, diplomat and royal favorite (d. 1574)
  - John Knox, Scottish clergyman, theologian and writer (d. 1572)
  - Barbara Uthmann, German businessperson (d. 1575)

== Deaths ==
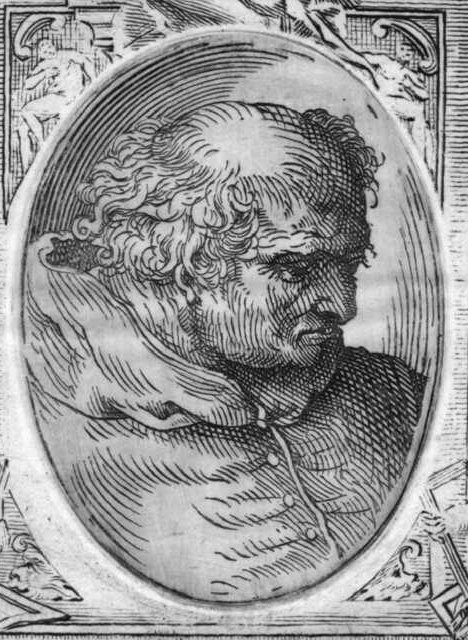
Donato Bramante

- January 2 – William Smyth, English bishop and statesman (b. 1460)
- January 9 – Anne of Brittany, queen-consort of France to both Charles VIII and Louis XII (b. 1477)
- March 11 – Donato Bramante, Italian architect (b. 1444)
- April 21 – Ichijō Fuyuyoshi, Japanese court noble (b. 1465)
- May 3 – Anna of Brandenburg, Duchess consort of Schleswig and Holstein (b. 1487)
- June 23 – Henry IV, Duke of Brunswick-Lüneburg (b. 1463)
- June 25 – Suster Bertken Dutch anchorite (b. 1426)
- July 20 – György Dózsa, Transylvanian peasant revolt leader (b. 1470)
- October 21 – Alexander, Count Palatine of Zweibrücken and Count of Veldenz (1489–1514) (b. 1462)
- October 25 – William Elphinstone, Scottish bishop and statesman (b. 1431)
- November 28 – Hartmann Schedel, German cartographer (b. 1440)
- date unknown
  - Agnes Fingerin, German philanthropist and businessperson
