= Weißer Turm =

Weißer Turm or Weisser Turm is German for "White Tower". It may refer to:

- Weißer Turm (Bad Homburg), also known as Schloßturm, a landmark in Bad Homburg, Germany
- Weißer Turm (Nuremberg U-Bahn) and the nearby landmark in Nuremberg, Germany
- Weißer Turm, a landmark in the Bergen-Enkheim district of Frankfurt am Main
- Weißer Turm, a landmark in Rees, North Rhine-Westphalia, Germany
- Weißer Turm, a landmark in Oberwesel, Rhineland-Palatinate, Germany

== See also ==
- Weißenthurm, a municipality in the district of Mayen-Koblenz, in Rhineland-Palatinate, Germany
- White Tower (disambiguation)
