= Variation suite =

Genre of classical music

Variation suite is a musical genre most popular during the early Baroque era. The variation suite consists of two or more movements where the first movement presents a theme and the remaining movements present variations on that theme. Movements in the variation suite are typically dance or dance-like forms, and are all in the same main key area. This cyclic form was predominantly used by German composers.

Paul Peuerl is credited with composing the first true variation suites, which were included in his Neue Paduan (1611). The form was codified by Johann Hermann Schein in his 1617 Banchetto musicale. Both based their compositional technique on the variation suite on the earlier varied couples form. The form is generally considered a hybrid of the theme and variations and the suite.
