= Lorenzkirche station =

Metro station in Nuremberg, Germany

Lorenzkirche
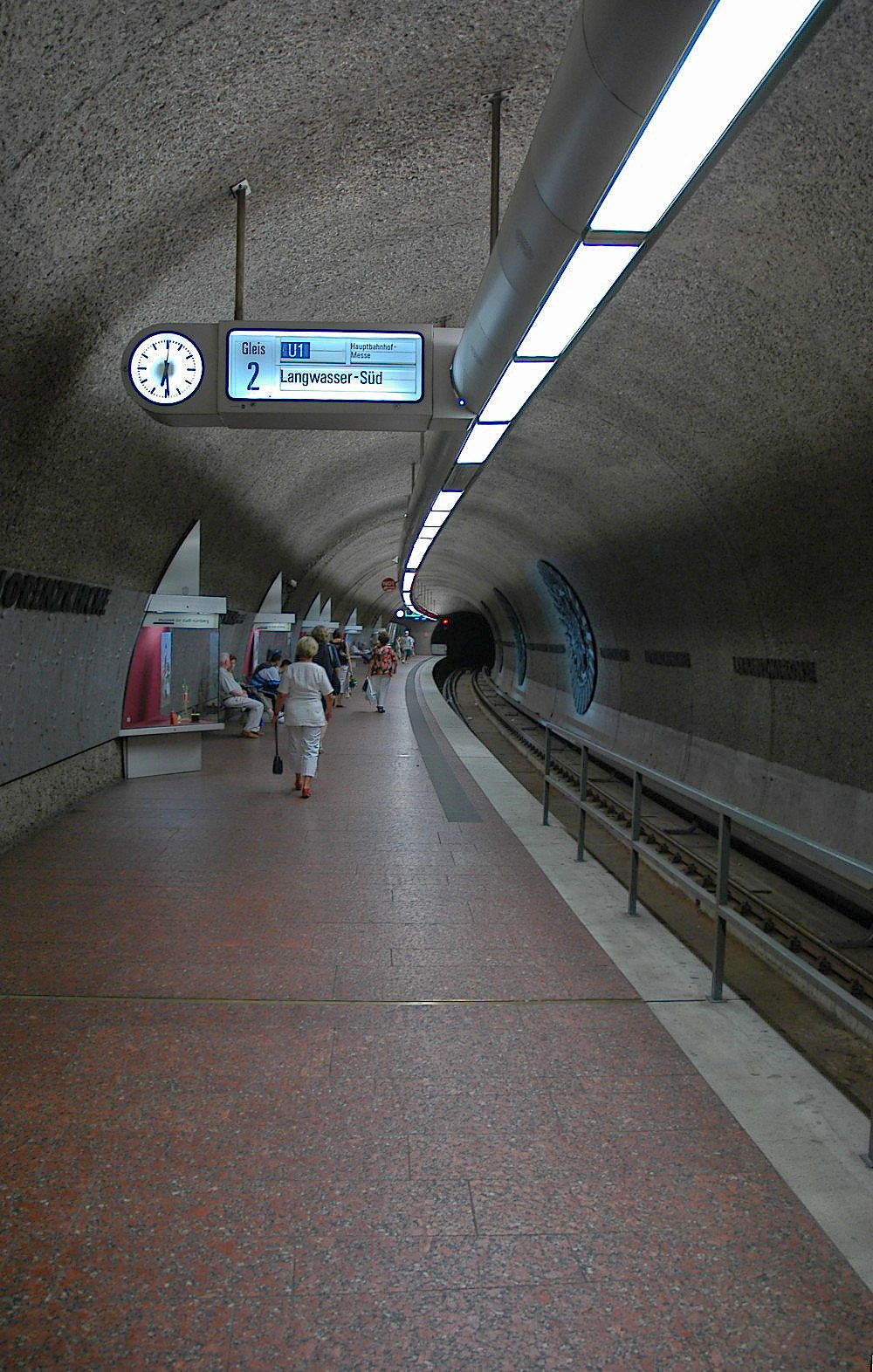

General information
- Location: Karolinenstr. 90402 Nürnberg, Germany
- Coordinates: 49.451036°N 11.0780466°E
- System: Nuremberg U-Bahn station
- Operator: Verkehrs-Aktiengesellschaft Nürnberg
- Connections: Bus: 46 Hl.-Geist-Spital - Martha-Maria-Krkhs; 47 Hl.-Geist-Spital - Forchheimer Str.

Construction
- Structure type: Underground

Other information
- Fare zone: VGN: 100

History
- Opened: 28 January 1978

Services
Preceding station	Nuremberg U-Bahn	Following station
Weißer Turm towards Fürth Hardhöhe	U1	Nürnberg Hbf towards Langwasser Süd
Location

Lorenzkirche station is a Nuremberg U-Bahn station, located on the U1 line.
