= 1533 in Sweden =

Events from the year 1533 in Sweden

== Incumbents ==
- Monarch – Gustav I

== Events ==
- February - The third of the Dalecarlian Rebellions is suppressed with the execution of its leaders.
- Olaus Petri is replaced as royal chancellor.
- The city of Lidköping is burned down by a fire.

== Births ==
- 13 December - Eric XIV of Sweden, monarch (died 1577)
