= Anna Hogenskild =

Swedish court official and landowner (1513–1590)

Anna Klemetsdotter Hogenskild (1513–1590), also known as fru Anna till Åkerö ('lady Anna of Åkerö') and fru Anna till Hedensö ('lady Anna of Hedensö'), was a Swedish court official and landowner. She served as hovmästarinna to queen Catherine Stenbock of Sweden, and then to the daughter and sisters of Eric XIV of Sweden.

== Life ==
Anna Hogenskild was the daughter of the nobleman Klemet Bengtsson Hogenskild of Åkerö (d. 1512) and lady Anna Hansdotter Thott of Bjurum (d. 1549). She belonged to a prominent noble family: her mother was the maternal granddaughter of princess Christina (ca 1432- before 1500), eldest daughter of Charles VIII of Sweden, and related to Sten Sture the Elder.

She married nobleman Jacob Krumme (d. 1531) in 1530, and nobleman Nils Pedersson Bielke (d. 1550) in 1537. In her second married she became the mother of three sons and a daughter: riksråd baron Hogenskild Bielke (1538–1605), Carin Nilsdotter Bielke (1539–1596), riksråd baron Claes Nilsson Bielke (1544–1623) of Vik, and riksråd Ture Nilsson Bielke (1548–1600).

=== Court career ===
She had good connections at court, where her family was in service. Her second spouse was a court official and a trusted confidant of king Gustav I of Sweden, her eldest son Hogenskild Bielke became the playmate of prince Magnus, Duke of Östergötland and later (1556) courtier of king Gustav; and her second son Claes married Elsa Fleming, the sister of queen Gunilla Bielke. Anna Hogenskild herself was eventually appointed hovmästarinna (Chief lady-in-waiting or Mistress of the Robes) to king Gustav's last queen, Catherine Stenbock, in 1555. As such, she was made responsible for all the ladies-in-waiting in the household of the queen. She was expected to guard the maids of honour, receive their letters (which were to be read in her presence) and control the keyes to their bed chamber.

Anna Hogenskild had been highly regarded by King Eric XIV already when he was a crown prince, and during his reign, he displayed his favor upon her and her children. After he succeeded to the throne in 1560, he had no queen, but he gave her the office of hovmästarinna in the household of the princesses, his sisters: Princess Cecilia, Anna, Sophia and Elizabeth of Sweden. She was also given the responsibility for the household of his illegitimate daughters Virginia Eriksdotter and Constantia Eriksdotter. As Mistress of the Household of the Princesses, she was known to have used her position to benefit her family: in 1563, eight of the thirteen maids-of-honour to the princesses where related to her. Her deputy hovmästarinna were Marina/Margareta Grip and Anna Bese, both widows of her mothers cousins; and Magdalena Gyllenstierna, sister-in-law of Marina Grip.

She was, however, apparently both well liked and respected at court, and was not known to be too strict: in fact, king Eric appointed her brother-in-law Ture Pedersson as chamberlain in the household of the princesses because he did not trust Anna Hogenskild to be able to keep his sisters sufficiently under control.

Anna left court service after the deposition of Eric XIV in 1568. King John III of Sweden suggested that the deposed king Eric was to be imprisoned in Vik Castle, one of the estates of Anna, but the negotiations did not succeed and the plan was not put to fruition.

=== Private life ===
Privately, she was a central matriarch in the powerful Bielke family, and her relationship to her relatives was described as warm and trusting rather than forceful and dominant. Judging by her accounts, she gave generous donations to the needing, but also to the Vadstena Abbey and the Nådendal Abbey, suggesting Catholic sympathies, which was not uncommon among the contemporary Swedish aristocracy despite the ongoing Swedish Reformation. It is known that several of her family members had Catholic sympathies: two of her sons, Ture Nilsson Bielke and Hogenskild Bielke, where to be executed by Charles XI of Sweden as loyalists with the Catholic Sigismund III Wasa, and her granddaughter Ebba Bielke judged for complicity though not executed.

Anna Hogenskild was one of the greatest landowners in contemporary Sweden. Her second spouse was a big landholder, owning estates both in Sweden and Denmark, and Anna herself inherited Åkerö Manor in 1540, where she preferred to reside. Due to the court service of her spouse, it was in effect she who managed the family estates for him, and after his death in 1550, she became a landowner also formally. Despite having to combine her own court service in parallel with the estates, she managed her lands with "much care, strength and success".

Her correspondence is preserved and the object of research.

Court offices
Preceded by	Mistress of the Robes to the Queen of Sweden	Succeeded by Elin Andersdotter
