= Claudia Sessa =

Italian composer

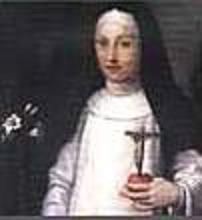

Claudia Sessa (c. 1570 – c. 1617/19) was an Italian composer and singer/instrumentalist. She was born into the (de) Sessa family, a patrician clan of the Milanese aristocracy. A nun at the convent of S. Maria Annunciata, she composed two sacred works published in 1613. The dates of her birth and death are uncertain. Gerolamo Borsieri wrote a long and glowing description of her (quoted in "Women Composers: Music Through the Ages"), including that she sang and accompanied herself so well "that there was not a singer who could equal her" and that nobility in Parma and Mantua liked her singing more than "Claudio Monteverdi [or] any other musician in the recitative style..."

== Works ==
- Occhi io vissi di voi
- Vatteme pur Lascivia

Her music has been recorded and issued on CD, including:

- Rosa Mistica Cappella Artemisia/Lombardi/Smith, (2000) Tactus
