= Paul Peuerl =

Paul Peuerl (also Bäurl, Beuerlin, Bäwerl, Agricola, Peyerl; 13 June 1570 (baptised), in Stuttgart – after 1625) was a German organist, organ builder, renovator and repairer, and composer of instrumental music.

From November 1601 he was organist in Horn and from late 1609 in Steyr. He built organs in Steyr, Horn, Enns, and Wilhering. Peuerl wrote the earliest published trio sonatas outside of Italy. His work on the suite form was for his time significant and influential. In 1625 he fled Steyr for religious reasons; his fate afterwards is unknown.

Musicologists began to research his work in 1865. A complete edition was published in 1929.

== Works ==
- Newe Padouan, Intrada, Däntz und Galliarda à 4 (Nuremberg, 1611), the first German ensemble publication to group dances into 4-movement variation suites
- Weltspiegel as ist neue teutsche Gesänger à 5 (Nuremberg, 1613), a collection of songs influenced by madrigal and balletto traditions
- Ettliche lustige Padovanen, Intraden, Galliarden, Couranten und Däntz à 3 (Nuremberg, 1620), consisting of fourteen suites each containing a pavan, a triple meter dance (either a galliard, an intrada, or a couranta), and a Däntz.
- Gantz Neue Padouanen, Auffzüg, Balleten, Couranten, Intraden, und Däntz à 3 (Nuremberg, 1625), 6 pieces in trio sonata form (two high melody parts with basso continuo), five of which are titled balletto and one called a Dantz.
- 40 dances and 2 canzonas
