= Ebba Bielke =

Swedish baroness convicted of high treason (1570–1618)

- Born: 1570
- Died: 1618 (aged 47–48)
- Parent: Hogenskild Bielke (father)
- Relatives: Anna Hogenskild (paternal grandmother); Svante Stensson Sture (grandfather); Martha Leijonhufvud (maternal grandmother)

Ebba Bielke (1570–1618), was a Swedish baroness convicted of high treason.

== Life ==
She was the daughter of riksråd baron Hogenskild Bielke and Anna Sture. She was thus the paternal granddaughter of Anna Hogenskild, and the maternal granddaughter of Svante Stensson Sture and Martha Leijonhufvud. In 1589, she married the brother-in-law of her uncle, Axel Bielke (d. 1597), the brother of queen Gunilla Bielke.

=== Political activity ===
Her father and brother were followers of Sigismund III Vasa against Charles IX of Sweden in the civil war of the 1590s. After her brother left Sweden in 1599, her father was imprisoned by Charles IX. During his imprisonment, he maintained a correspondence with Ebba Bielke. He gave her the task of keeping him informed about the conspiracies against Charles and collect evidence of conflicts between Charles and the royal council, which she did.

In 1605, Hogenskild Bielke was brought to trial for high treason and executed on the evidence of, among other things, his correspondence with his daughter. Ebba Bielke herself was also arrested, judged as an accomplice in the crimes of her father. Her property was confiscated by the crown and she was sentenced to imprisonment.

== See also ==
- Ebba Stenbock
