= Hogenskild Bielke =

Swedish baron and court official (1538–1605)

- Baron of Läckö
- A portrait of Hogenskild Bielke

- Coat of arms
- Full name: Hogenskild Nilsson Bielke af Åkerö
- Born: 1538; Stora Dala, Västergötland, Sweden
- Died: 3 June 1605 (aged 67); Stockholm, Sweden
- Noble family: Bielke family
- Spouse: Anna Sture (m. 1569; died 1595)
- Issue: 6 (including Ebba and Nils)
- Father: Nils Pedersson Bielke
- Mother: Anna Hogenskild
- Occupation: Privy Councillor, Diplomat, Land Owner
- Education: Åbo Latin School; University of Wittenberg; Odense Latin School

Hogenskild Nilsson Bielke af Åkerö (1538 – 3 June 1605) was a Swedish baron, court official and riksråd. He was one of the more prominent leaders of the Swedish nobility in their power struggle against royal authority during the 16th century.

== Early life ==
Hogenskild Bielke was born in 1538 at Stora Dala, a manor in Västergötland. His father was Nils Pedersson Bielke, a Chamber Councillor (Kammarråd) for the Chamber College and his mother was Anna Hogenskild.

Bielke began his education at the Turku Latin School in 1547, where he was instructed by Mikael Agricola. In 1551, he studied at the University of Wittenberg under Paul Eber and in 1554, he studied at the Odense Latin School. By the time he was finished with his studies, Bielke was described as a cautious, somewhat well-read young man. He had frail health and had very little interest in sports.

== Career ==
Bielke began his career as a court attendant in the court of Magnus, Duke of Östergötland in 1556. This was followed by a string of serving in the courts of Gustav Vasa and Erik XIV in 1557 and 1558 respectively. In 1559, he was appointed head chef (köksmästare) to Erik XIV. In 1560, during the coronation of Erik XIV, he was knighted. Bielke allied himself closely to Svante Stensson Sture following the acscension of Erik XIV.

Bielke attended the parliaments (riksdagar) of 1560, and 1561, held in Stockholm, Arboga, and Uppsala. He attended the lords assemblies (herredag) of 1562, and 1563, held in Jönköping and Uppsala. In 1562, Bielke became a member of the Privy Council of Sweden (riksråd). Like many other nobles, Bielke sided with Erik XIV against John III and was in favor of the Arboga Agreement, that would limit the autonomy of Erik's brothers. In 1563, he was made the Swedish envoy to Christopher, Duke of Mecklenburg who was at the time the coadjutor to the Archbishopric of Riga.

Bielke participated in the Northern Seven Years' War in 1565. However, his involvement was quite limited despite being given command of troops from Småland, Östergötland, and Västergötland in 1566. In addition, he was also made commandant of Varberg Fortress in the same year. Bielke was captured by Danes under Daniel Rantzau in 1567, and he would not return to Sweden until 1568.

Bielke openly expressed his sympathies for Nils Svantesson Sture during his trial in 1566. On 24 May, 1567, During the Sture Murders, Bielke was kept under house arrest. Later, he would broker a reconciliation between Erik XIV and the relatives of the dead. Parallel to this, Bielke was one of the accusers of the King's favourite Jöran Persson, who was later executed in 1568. Following Persson's execution, Duke Charles IX and Per Brahe the Elder demanded that Bielke be executed.

In the autumn of 1573, the Mornay plot was prepared to assassinate John III. The plot was led by Charles de Mornay, who was in contact with Christina of Denmark and the French ambassador in Copenhagen Charles Dancay. John III was to be killed during a swords dance performed by Scottish mercenaries at the party which was to be given in October that year before the Scottish mercenaries departure to the Baltic, and the king's brother Duke Charles was to be placed upon the throne. The plot did not materialize as de Mornay lost his nerve and never gave the sign to the mercenaries to take action. In September 1574, the plot was revealed and Charles de Mornay was arrested, interrogated and executed. It was never made clear who participated in the plot, but it was noted that the suspected conspirators Hogenskild Bielke, Gustaf Banér and Pontus De la Gardie often gathered at meetings in the apartment of Princess Elizabeth of Sweden with Princess Cecilia of Sweden, and Charles de Mornay claimed that one of the things which were agreed upon by the conspirators was to raise the dowry of Elizabeth from 100,000 to 150,000, so to make it possible for her to make a marriage of higher status, which would refer to the suggested marriage between Elizabeth and Henry III of France, in which the French ambassador had expressed himself impressed by everything regarding Elizabeth with the exception of her dowry. The two royal sisters and their brother Charles were somewhat compromised, though neither they, Bielke, Banér or De la Gardie was openly accused of their suspected involvement.

When the king and queen visited their son Sigismund III Wasa in Reval in 1589, he and Axel Bielke was appointed to serve as regent during their absence. He was described as clever and skillful and worked to increase the power of nobility against the crown. He sided with Sigimund III against Duke Charles. His son Svante fled to Denmark after the War against Sigismund to avoid execution. Hogenskild was tried during the Linköping Bloodbath in 1600, but was imprisoned rather than executed. In 1605, however, he was found to have been involved in a correspondence judged as treasonable alongside his daughter Ebba Bielke. He was executed for treason in Stockholm.
