= Weißer Turm station =

Metro station in Nuremberg, Germany

Weißer Turm
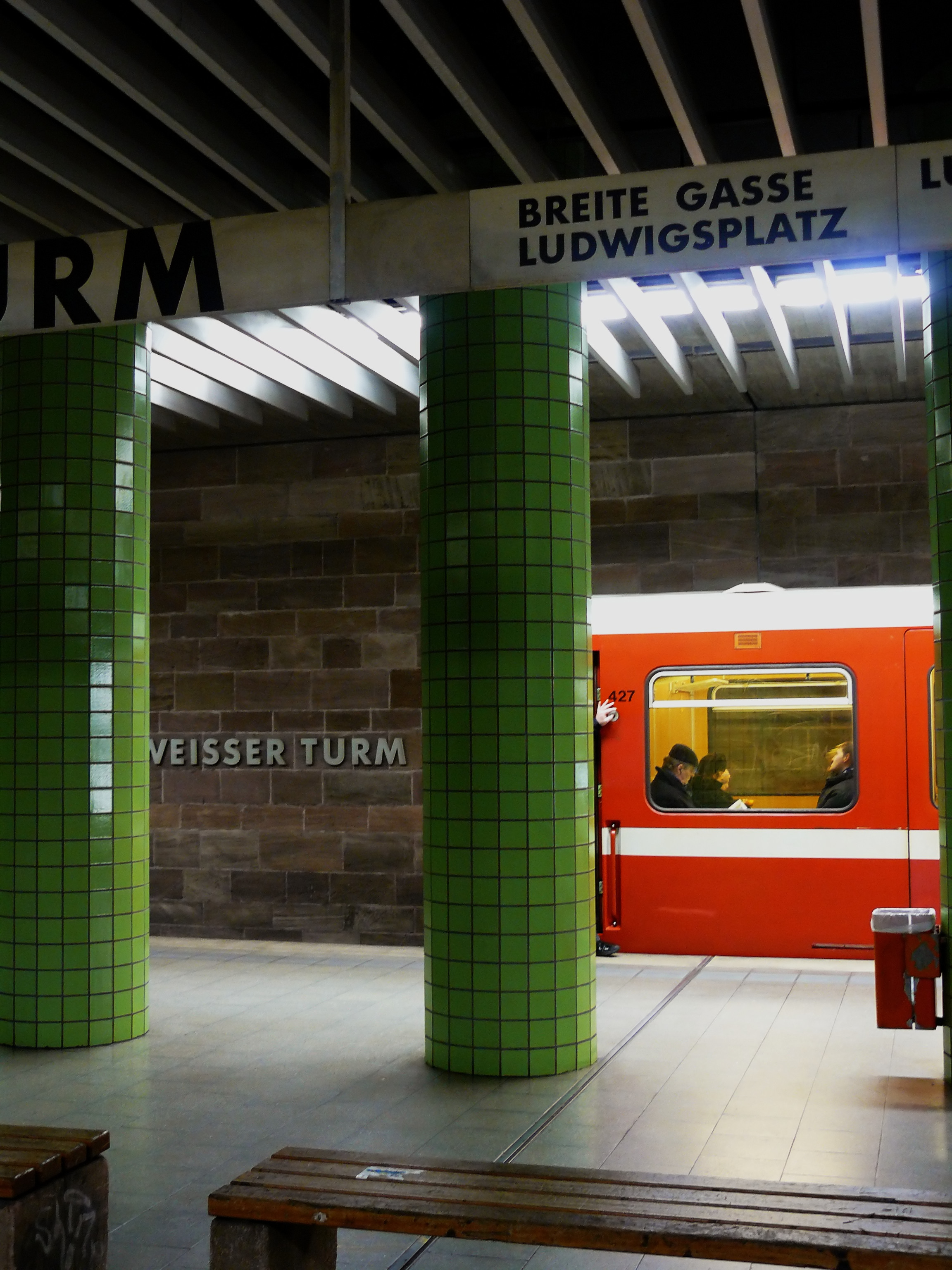

General information
- Location: Ludwigspl. 90403 Nürnberg, Germany
- Coordinates: 49.4508039°N 11.0715905°E
- System: Nuremberg U-Bahn station
- Operator: Verkehrs-Aktiengesellschaft Nürnberg

Construction
- Structure type: Underground

Other information
- Fare zone: VGN: 100

History
- Opened: 28 January 1978

Services
Preceding station	Nuremberg U-Bahn	Following station
Plärrer towards Fürth Hardhöhe	U1	Lorenzkirche towards Langwasser Süd
Location

Weißer Turm station is a Nuremberg U-Bahn station, located on the U1 line. Located in the south-western part of Nuremberg's historical city and at the western end of the pedestrian-only shopping district. It serves as a destination for shoppers and shop employees during the day and provides transportation to the amusement venues (primarily bars and restaurants) located in the vicinity during the evenings. Like all subway stations in Nuremberg, it opens at about 5 am and closes at about 1 am Mondays to Sundays.

== Architecture ==
=== Platform level ===
The station features an island platform with one track at each side located at -2 storeys. The 100 meter long platform is aligned in a northeast-southwest direction and has middle columns.

At the southwest end, a straight staircase and one upward escalator lead to the southwest entrance level. About one third from the northeast end the northeast staircase is located one upward and one downward escalator on each side. At the northeast platform end (below the northeast staircase) an elevator provides access from and to the platform, the northeast access level and the street level.

Almost walls and all columns are tiled with leaf-green tiles, except the wall behind the tracks, which are covered with sandstones, a reference to the sandstone of Nuremberg's Castle Hill, to which this subway station is the closest.

=== Access levels ===
There are two access level, located at the -1 level at the northeast and at the southwest end of the station.

==== Southwest ====
The southwest access level is a small space with a disused ticket booth and ticket vending machines. A staircase with one upward escalator leads from the platform level to this access level, and another staircase with one upward escalator leads to the street level. The access level space and the downward staircase are tiled leaf-green.

==== Northeast ====
This is the access level used by most shoppers. A broader staircase with one upward and one downward escalator provide access to the platform level. Two escalators (one up and one down) opposite the downward staircase are located inside the historical structure of the Weißer Turm link the access level to the pedestrian only street above, and surface in front of the Ehebrunnen (Marriage Fountain). At the north side of the access level, there are two ticket vending machines, a ticket and convenience booth and a door to the basement level of the Wöhrl clothing store. To the south, there is a fixed staircase to the street level and door to the basement level of the C&A clothing store.

== Subway infrastructure and service ==
=== Infrastructure ===
The station is served by two tracks (1435 mm European normal gauge), which are usually used as direction tracks, with right side traffic. Signals are present at both tracks in both directions.

To the northeast there are no points between Weißer Turm and Lorenzkirche (Nuremberg U-Bahn), therefore signal can show only Hp0 (Stop), Hp1 (Proceed at Line speed) and Hp5 (Proceed and be prepared for obstacles on track, used only in cases of Interlocking malfunctions) aspects.

To the southwest, an X-shaped crossing (scissors crossing) links both tracks before the two tracks separate, the westbound track leading to Plärrer's -2 Level and the eastbound track leading to Plärrer's -3 level. Consequently, the signals at the southwest platform end can show the aspect Hp2 (Proceed at 40 km/h) in addition to Hp0, Hp1 and Hp5 which is used when a train crosses from one track to the other via the X-shaped crossing.
