= Agnes Fingerin =

German businessperson

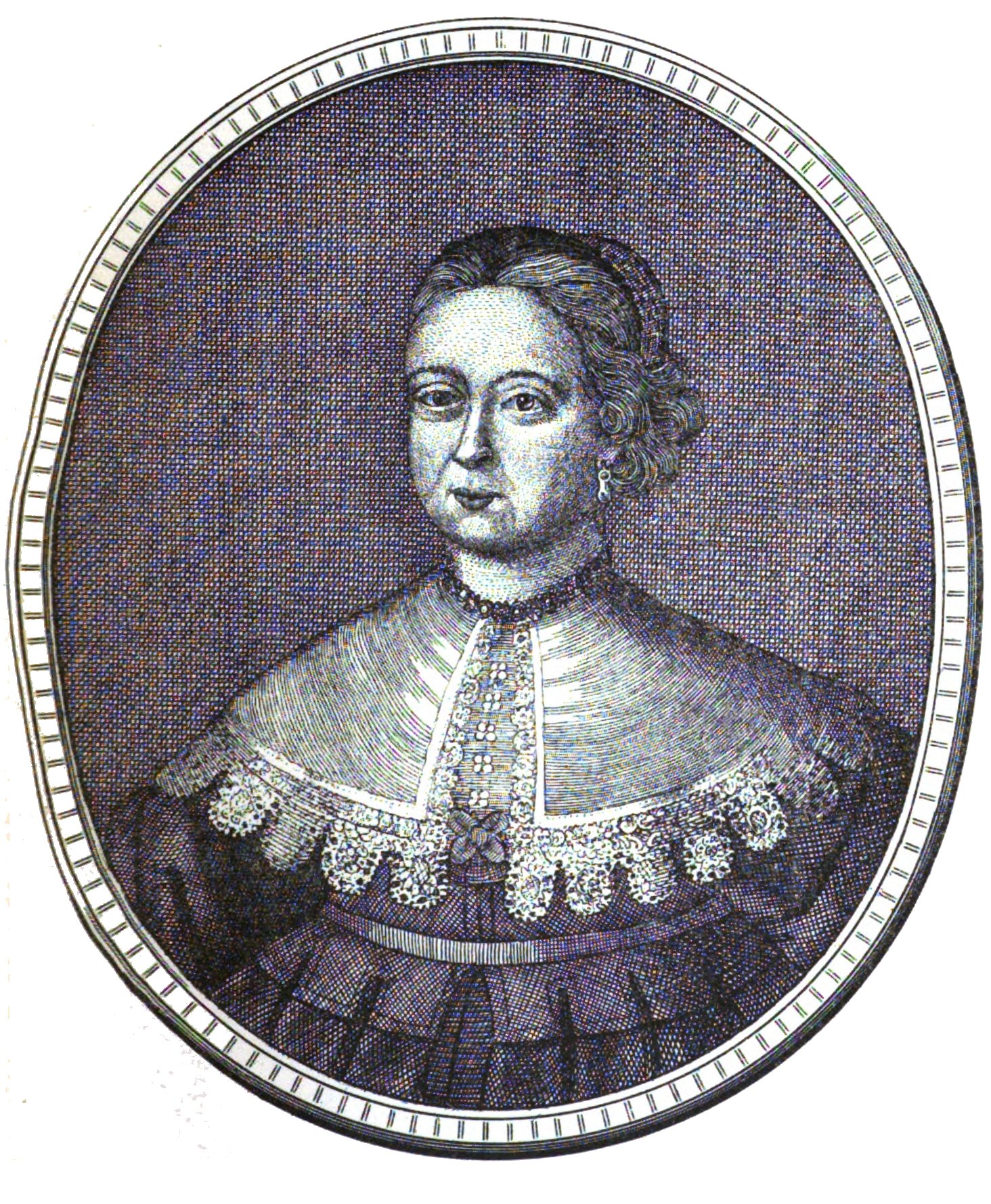
Agnes Fingerin

Agnes Finger, or Agnes Fingerin (died 1514), was a German businessperson. She married a tailor in Görlitz, and became a childless widow after a short marriage in 1465. She took over the business of her late husband and managed it for almost fifty years, never remarrying. She was rich and successful, and founded the charity foundation Fromme Stiftung von Brot und Salz in 1471, which distributed bread for the poor, Agnetenbrot, until 1563. She famously made a pilgrimage to Jerusalem in 1476.
