= Thomson Snell & Passmore =

British law firm

- Headquarters: Tunbridge Wells
- No. of offices: 2
- No. of attorneys: 130
- No. of employees: 242
- Major practice areas: General Practice
- Key people: Senior Partner – Joanna Pratt CEO – Sarah Henwood
- Revenue: £21.2m (2018)
- Date founded: 1570; 456 years ago
- Founder: Nicholas Hooper
- Website: Official website

Thomson Snell & Passmore is a law firm in Kent, in the United Kingdom. It holds the Guinness World Record for being the oldest continually operating law firm still in existence. Some of the documents retained by the firm have been used in the television series Downton Abbey to lend an air of authenticity to the show.

== History ==
In 1570 a curate of the Tonbridge Parish Church by the name of Nicholas Hooper announced himself as a "scrivener and drafter of documents". He supplemented his ecclesiastical stipend by drafting wills and property bonds, and taking advantage of the expansion of merchant activity under the reign of Elizabeth I of England. Hooper's son John took over the practice in 1618, and the firm stayed in the family until John's descendant George Hooper died in 1759.

After George Hooper's death the firm was acquired by Thomas Scoons of Tonbridge, who also controlled the Pantiles. He passed it to his son, William Scoons, who was joined by his own sons William Junior and John Scoons. In the 1850s the Scoons family died off, leaving the firm to a partner, Sydney Alleyne. The firm was known as Alleyne & Walker during the Victorian era. In 1890 it was taken over by John Thomas Freer, becoming Alleyne Morgan & Freer. In 1939 the firm was bought by another firm, Templar & Passmore. The firm acquired its current name in 1968.

Frederick Alfred Snell, the son of the founder of one of the firms that merged to create the current firm, held the record for the oldest practising solicitor in England at his death at the age of 96 in 1954.

== Practice areas ==
As of 2017, Thomson Snell & Passmore operates in the areas of wills, trusts, and estates, property law, and commercial law, as they have since 1570. In addition they offer a wide variety of modern services to both individuals and businesses.

In recent years they have expanded their focus on commercial clients, with a 25.5% growth in income from commercial clients in the first half of 2016. During the same time period, the firm's private client practice grew by 7%. Growth continued in the latter part of 2016, despite concerns about the effect Brexit would have on the British economy.
