= Princess Elizabeth of Sweden =

Swedish princess (1549–1597)

Elizabeth Vasa
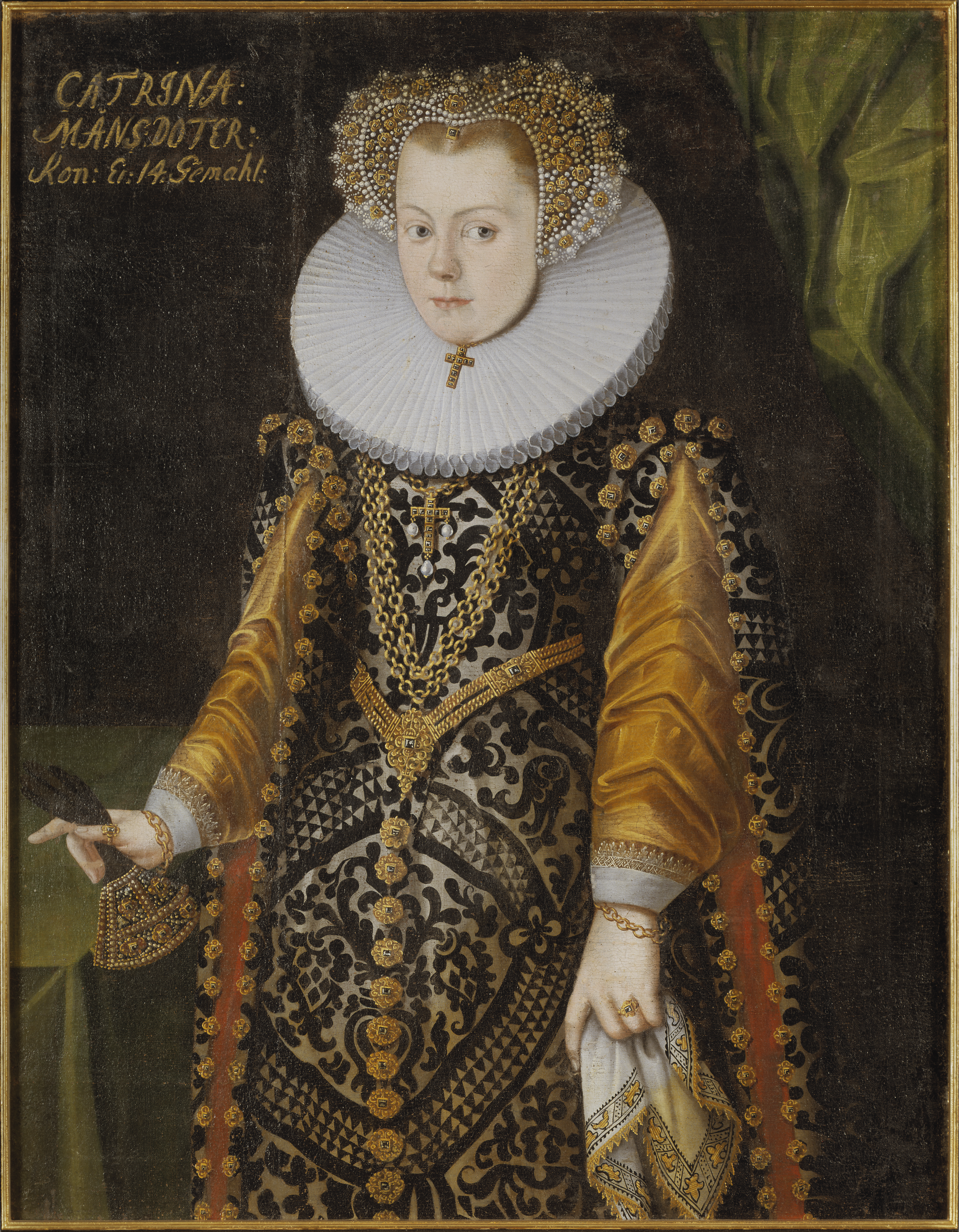
- This image was long considered to be of her sister-in-law Queen Catherine but is now assumed to be of Elizabeth, with the text on the painting added later. It was probably painted in about 1580 when Elizabeth was engaged.
- Born: 5 April 1549; Kungsör, Sweden
- Died: 20 November 1597 (aged 48); Stockholm, Sweden
- Burial: Uppsala Cathedral
- Spouse: Christopher, Duke of Mecklenburg (m. 1581; died 1592)
- Issue: Margaret Elisabeth, Duchess of Mecklenburg
- House: Vasa
- Father: Gustav I of Sweden
- Mother: Margaret Leijonhufvud

Princess Elizabeth of Sweden (also known as Elisabet Gustavsdotter Vasa; 5 April 1549 – 20 November 1597) was a Swedish princess, and a duchess consort of Mecklenburg-Gadebusch by marriage to Christopher, Duke of Mecklenburg-Gadebusch. She was the daughter of King Gustav I of Sweden and his second wife, Queen Margaret.

== Biography ==
=== Early life ===
During her early childhood, she, as well as her siblings in the royal nursery, were primarily under the care of her mother the queen's trusted nurse, Brigitta Lars Anderssons, her mother's cousin lady Margareta and the noble widow Ingrid Amundsdotter.

After the death of her mother in 1551, she as well as her siblings were placed in the care of Christina Gyllenstierna and then under her aunts Brita and Martha Leijonhufvud before her father's remarriage to Catherine Stenbock. They were then under the responsibility of their stepmother and, more precisely, the head-lady-in-waiting Anna Hogenskild.

In 1556, she and her sisters were given a dowry of 100,000 daler, had their portraits painted and their personal qualities described in Latin by the court poet Henricus Mollerus, and presented on the Dynastic marriage market. In contrast to her older sister Sofia Vasa, who was described as the most unhappy of the children of Gustav Vasa, Princess Elizabeth has been described as the happiest: she seemed to have a cheerful and placid personality. She was described as blond and pretty. A portrait originally believed to be of queen Karin Månsdotter now is believed to be of her.

Elizabeth had her own court and was responsible for the upbringing of her brothers' illegitimate children. Karin Månsdotter was among her maids before Karin became the mistress and later queen of Elizabeth's brother, King Eric XIV of Sweden. During the Northern Seven Years' War, she apparently showed generosity to Danish and German officers kept prisoners in Sweden.

At the dethronement of King Eric XIV in 1568, Duke Magnus II of Saxe-Lauenburg, consort of her sister Princess Sophia, took her, Sophia and Queen Dowager Catherine by boat from the royal palace of Stockholm, to abandon Eric by joining the rebels, headed by Prince John in Uppsala. John stated in the official propaganda, that Eric had planned to present Catherine, Sophia and Elizabeth as hostages to Russia after he had failed to so with John's consort.

Both before and after her marriage, Elizabeth acted as a stabilizing factor and a mediator during conflicts between her siblings. She kept in lifelong contact with them all through correspondence, and this could also be political. This is especially true regarding her brother Charles, with whom she was particularly close her entire life. During the reign of John III, the other siblings used her as an informer, as she lived in the close vicinity with John.

In the autumn of 1573, the Mornay plot was prepared to assassinate John III. The plot was led by Charles de Mornay, who was in contact with Christina of Denmark and the French ambassador in Copenhagen Charles Dancay. John III was to be killed during a swords dance performed by Scottish mercenaries at the party which was to be given in October that year before the Scottish mercenaries departure to the Baltic. After the assassination, Duke Charles was to be placed upon the throne. Charles de Mornay, who had previously been the favorite of Eric XIV, promised that he knew the location of Eric's alleged hidden gold reserve, which he would reveal after the coup in exchange for better conditions for Eric in prison. However, the plot did not materialize because at the party, de Mornay never dared to give the sign to the mercenaries to take action.

In September 1574, the plot was revealed and Charles de Mornay was arrested, interrogated and executed. It was never made clear who participated in the plot. However, it is noted, that the suspected conspirators Hogenskild Bielke, Gustaf Banér and Pontus De la Gardie, often gathered at meetings in the apartment of Princess Elizabeth, meetings where Princess Cecilia of Sweden had also frequently been seen, and the two sisters and their brother Charles were somewhat compromised though they were never accused. Charles de Mornay also revealed, that one of the things which were agreed upon by the conspirators was to raise the dowry of Elizabeth from 100,000 to 150,000, so to make it possible for her to make a marriage of higher status. It is noted, that the marriage between Elizabeth and Henry III of France, which was officially suggested in 1574, could have been informally suggested through Charles already the year before, and that the French ambassador had expressed himself impressed by everything regarding Elizabeth with the exception of her dowry.

=== Marriage policy ===
Princess Elizabeth was betrothed in 1562 to Christopher, the third son of Albert VII, Duke of Mecklenburg-Güstrow. Soon after, however, he was captured and held hostage for several years, and the engagement was considered broken. During the reign of the pro-Catholic John III, they were conflict as to whether she should be married to a Protestant or a Catholic. In 1573, John III negotiated for a marriage with Grand Duke of Tuscany, while she herself, assisted by Charles and her sister Catherine, negotiated in secret for a marriage among the Protestant German princes, such as the dukes of Pomerania and Cleves.

In 1574, arrangements were made between her brother John III and the French queen dowager Catherine de' Medici to marry her to Henry III of France. Catherine de' Medici regarded Elizabeth as suitable as she wished for her son to marry a royal princess, the match was also seen as beneficial to maintaining French influence in Poland and it would gain France an ally outside of the Habsburg lands which surrounded France. According to contemporary reports, Catherine also regarded it as benefit that Elizabeth could not speak French, as this would make it harder for her to replace Catherine in her role as the dominant queen at the French court. The French ambassador in Denmark, Charles Dancay, was given the task of providing a portrait of Elizabeth and gave the following report of her character:

"I have been assured that she is very beautiful, has good sense, that she is pleasing, has a good figure and posture ... everyone recommends her great humility, in truth Sire, everyone that knows her admires and honors her virtues ... She finds her pleasure at the spinet and plays it better than most, she also plays the lute, and she is also of a mild and soothing temperament.

By all regarded as one of the most accomplished and most virtuous princesses in Europe, and that no one had heard of any fault, physical nor in the mind"

In January 1575, the French envoy Claude Pinart visited Sweden to see Elizabeth, but as she was with her brother Charles in Nyköping, the princess refused to join John III in Stockholm to meet with Pinart who instead had to travel to Nyköping to see her. The marriage was almost decided upon when the French king unexpectedly announced that he himself had decided to marry Louise of Lorraine-Vaudémont instead of Elizabeth.

In 1576, John III sent Count Pontus De la Gardie to Italy to negotiate a marriage between Elizabeth and the Duke of Modena, or failing that, find another available Italian Prince. The purpose was to strengthen the bond between the Pro-Catholic King and the Pope as well as to make it easier for him to obtain an Italian inheritance from his mother-in-law, Bona Sforza. However, Elizabeth, now supported by their younger brother Charles, refused any match with a Catholic for religious reasons. The conflict between her and John III was illustrated when, in March 1578, he sent three councillors to lecture her. Though it is not known what they said, she reportedly cried and fainted repeatedly after their visit.

=== Duchess of Mecklenburg-Gadebusch ===
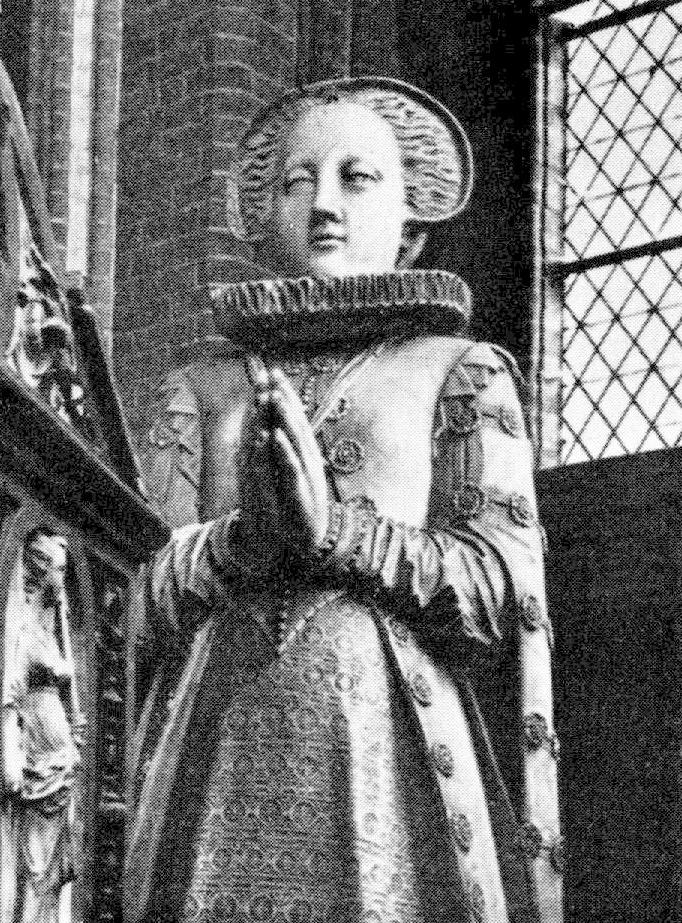
The Duchess in a lifesize sculpture on the Schwerin grave monument of her husband

In 1576, her former betrothed, the now recently widowed Christopher of Mecklenburg proposed a second time, and was accepted. Elizabeth herself participated in the negotiations personally to ensure her economical rights, assisted by her siblings Charles and Catherine, while King John accepted the marriage mainly because he saw it suitable that she marry because of her age. The marriage was delayed because of religious reasons: the staunch Protestants Elizabeth and Charles were careful to defend that the wedding ceremony and everything regarding it should be Lutheran against the Pro-Catholic John III. Elizabeth had the Augsburg Confession translated for the first time to Swedish and printed to the guests at the wedding, likely as a way of demonstrating against the Pro-Catholic policy of John. Elizabeth and Christopher were married in Stockholm 7 May 1581. She arrived in Wismar in Mecklenburg in July, where she was welcomed by the nobility and representatives of the Hansa from Rostock and Lübeck. However, Elizabeth was not accepted by the pro-Danish family of her consort.

The couple lived in the city of Gadebusch in the part of the duchy of Mecklenburg which had been divided into a duchy for her consort, Mecklenburg-Gadebush. The relationship between Elizabeth and Christopher has been described as happy. Their long wait for each other has been considered a sign that this was not merely an arranged marriage, but also a love match: the preserved letters have also been regarded as an sign that their union was happier and more personal than most royal marriages of the time.

Christopher challenged his brother Ulrich about the guardianship and regency over his nephew John, and Elizabeth tried to use her contacts to assist him until the conflict ceased in 1585: her brother John III was however never very interested in helping her. She actively worked for Swedish interests in Mecklenburg and had a lot of Swedes at her court.

Elizabeth was described as an ideal Lutheran princess consort. She benefited Lutheranism, founded a Protestant library and corresponded with the Lutheran theologian David Chytraeus in Rostock. In 1589–90, she arranged the marriage between her brother Charles and Christina of Holstein-Gottorp. Through correspondence, Elizabeth continued to act as an informer and a mediator between her siblings during conflicts.

=== Later life ===
In March 1592, Elizabeth Vasa became a widow. The lands of her consort was then incorporated into those of her former in-laws, which were Pro-Danish and refused her access to her dower lands and income.

In 1593, she returned to Sweden with her daughter, which she placed under the guardianship of her brother Charles. She also demanded to be given her dowry, which had never been paid, and wished to discuss a proposal of marriage from John Frederick of Brunswick-Lüneburg with Charles. In 1594, Charles secured her Norrköping for her residence and income, where she resided with her court. Elizabeth was given secret document to keep from the royal council by Charles, and during the conflict between Charles and Sigismund, the loyalists of Sigismund kept watch of whom she visited and consorted with because of her closeness to Charles, and speculated about her political sympathies. She was present at the assembly in Stockholm in the summer of 1597, where Charles was granted more authority.

Elizabeth died suddenly and unexpectedly 10 November 1597. Elizabeth had a grave monument constructed for herself and her spouse in the Cathedral of Schwerin, but in the end she was buried in her father's family grave in Uppsala Cathedral.

== Issue ==
- Margaret Elizabeth of Mecklenburg-Gadebusch, Duchess of Mecklenburg, married her kinsman John Albert II, Duke of Mecklenburg-Güstrow in 1608 and had issue.

== Ancestors ==
Ancestors of Princess Elizabeth of Sweden

Johan Kristiersson (Vasa)
Erik Johansson (Vasa)
Birgitta Gustafsdotter (Sture)
Gustav I of Sweden (Vasa)
Måns Karlsson (Eka)
Cecilia Månsdotter (Eka)
Sigrid Eskilsdotter (Banér)
Elizabeth of Sweden (Vasa)
Abraham Kristiernsson (Leijonhufvud)
Erik Abrahamsson (Leijonhufvud)
Birgitta Månsdotter (Natt och Dag)
Margareta Leijonhufvud
Erik Karlsson (Vasa)
Ebba Eriksdotter (Vasa)
Anna Karlsdotter (Vinstorpa)
