= The White Tower (Czech Republic) =

- Bílá věž
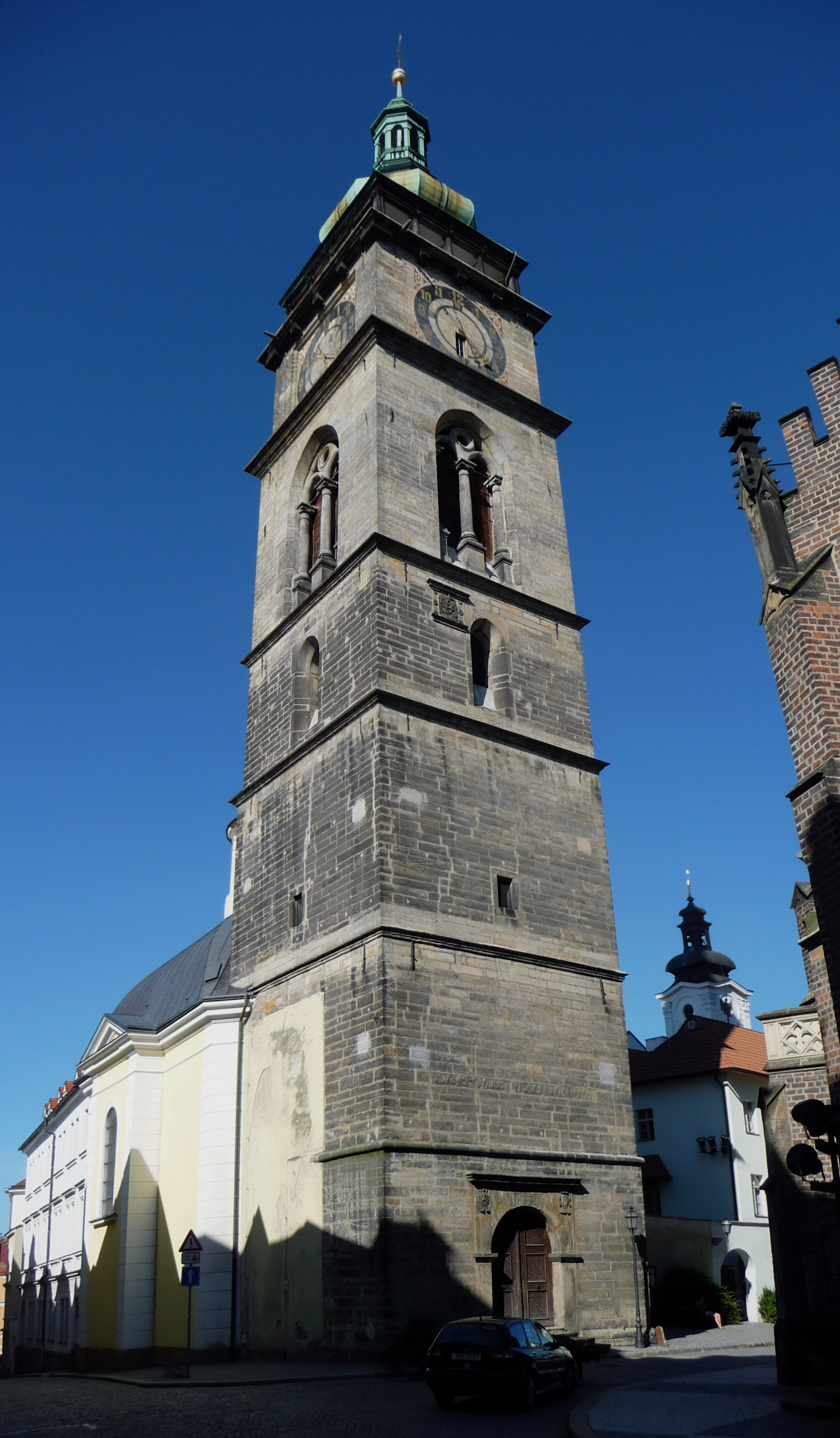
- The White Tower is situated in the city centre of Hradec Králové
- The White Tower
- 50°12′32.3″N 15°49′51″E
- Location: Hradec Králové
- Country: Czech Republic
- Website: www.bilavez.cz

History
- Founded: 7 June 1574

Sound of the Tower's bell Augustin (1940)

The White Tower (Czech: Bílá věž) is the tallest dominant of the city Hradec Králové in the Czech Republic. From the tower's galleries there is a unique view not only of Hradec Králové, but also of the distant peaks of the Giant Mountains and the Orlické Mountains. In recent years the tower came back to life with the exhibitions and became the center of tourism and cultural events. The White Tower houses the third largest and heaviest bell in the Czech Republic – the Augustine Bell.

== History ==
On 7 June 1574 the construction of the White Tower started in the middle of the western side of the Great Square in Hradec Králové. The construction was funded by charity gifts of the citizens of the city. In the course of the next six years a tower 72 metres (236 ft) tall was built.

The White Tower is the highest dominating monument of the city of Hradec Králové and most likely the highest building in Eastern Bohemia. In May 1581 the impressive Augustine Bell, 169 centimetres (67 in) high and 206 centimetres (81 in) wide was hanged on the fourth floor of the tower during a festive celebration. The bell was cast already in 1509 by famous Hradec bell founder Ondřej Žáček at the expense of the city and the commons. There is only one bell in Bohemia that is bigger. It is the famous Zikmund Bell that can be found in St. Vitus Cathedral at Prague Castle.

== Interesting facts ==
The White Tower was named after its building material, which is white stone. The Augustine Bell weighs 10 tonnes. On special occasions it rings even nowadays.

If the hands on the clock seem to you to be the wrong way round, then your eyes are not deceiving you. One of the explanations is that in the past minutes were not as important and it was possible to see the large hand from a greater distance – e.g. from a nearby field.

== Opening hours ==
It is possible to visit the White Tower from 1 April to 30 September, daily from 09:00-12:00 and 13:00-17:00. The White Tower is possible to visit exceptionally on the night tours as well.
