= 1578 in Sweden =

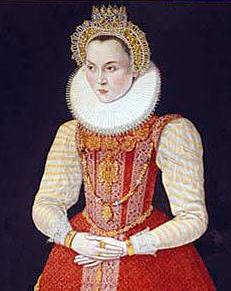
Sophia of Saxe-Lauenburg (1568) 1570s by unknown

Events from the year 1578 in Sweden

== Incumbents ==
- Monarch – John III

== Events ==
- Swedish victory over Russia in the Battle of Wenden.
- The king attempt to expel the Romani by threatening with forced labor in the Sala silver mine.

== Deaths ==
- Filippa Fleming, Finnish heiress and landowner (born unknown)
