= 1573 in Sweden =

Events from the year 1573 in Sweden

== Incumbents ==
- Monarch – John III

== Events ==
- 23 January - Battle of Lode
- - The deposed King Erik XIV is separated from his family: the former King is taken to Västerås Castle, Karin Månsdotter and their daughter to Åbo (Turku) Castle, and their son is taken from them.

== Births ==
- Johannes Canuti Lenaeus, professor at Uppsala University and Archbishop of Uppsala (died 1669)

== Deaths ==
- 1 January - Hans Boije af Gennäs, commander
- 26 October - Laurentius Petri, the first Evangelical Lutheran Archbishop of Sweden (born 1499)
