= 1577 in Sweden =

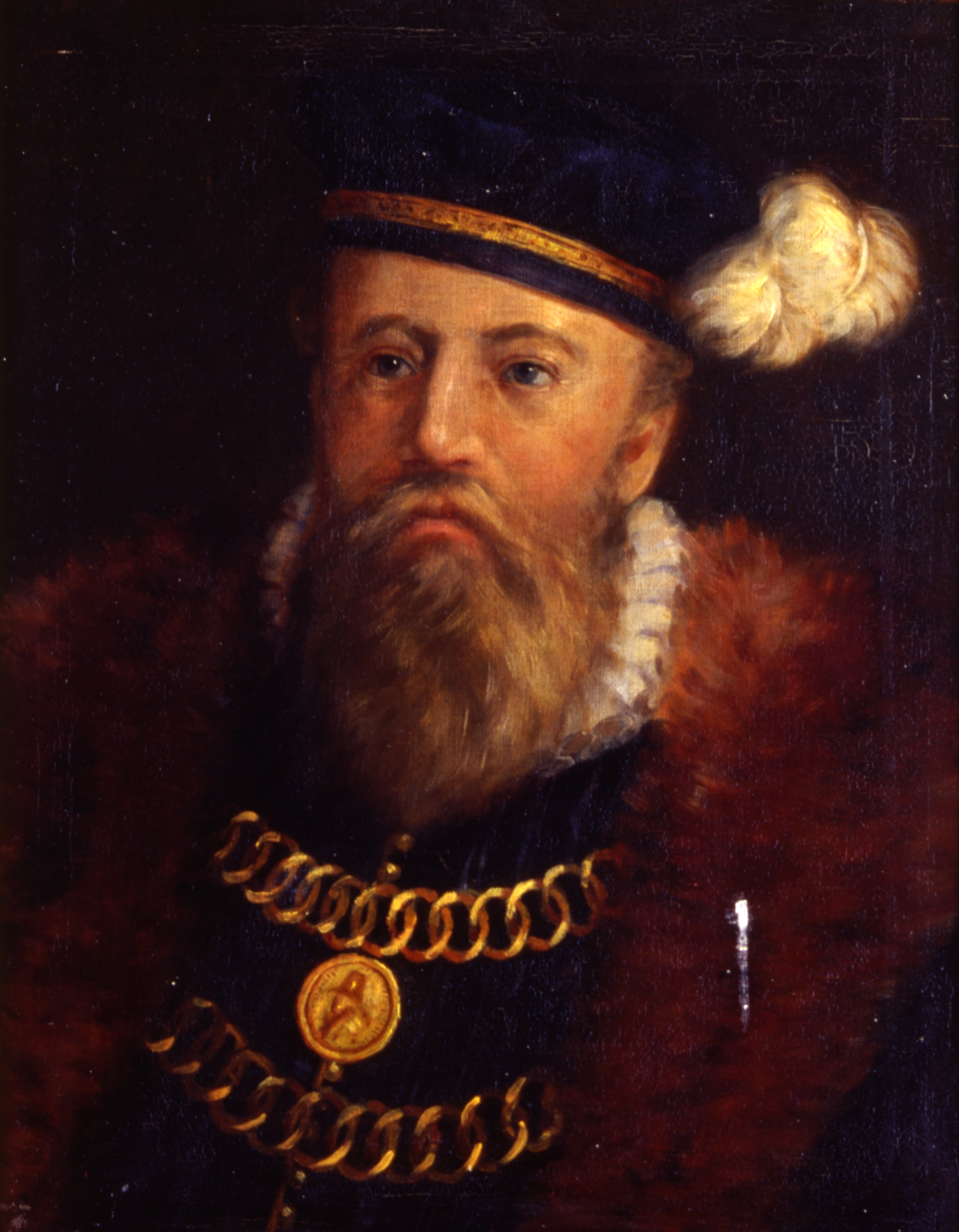
Jacob Bagge

Events from the year 1577 in Sweden

== Incumbents ==
- Monarch – John III

== Events ==
- - The arrival of the Pope's ambassador Antonio Possevino to Sweden.
- - The so-called Röda boken (The Read Book), a church service which establishes a compromise between Protestantism and Catholic, is introduced.
- - Tre Kronor (castle) is rebuilt as a renaissance palace.
- - John III takes the title Grand Prince of Finland.
- - Sigrid Sture appointed governor of Stranda Hundred.

== Births ==
- - Johan Skytte, soldier and politician (died 1645)
- - Jesper Mattson Cruus af Edeby, soldier and politician (died 1622)

== Deaths ==
- - Eric XIV of Sweden, monarch (born 1533)
- - Jakob Bagge, admiral (born 1502)
