= Charles Dançay =

French diplomat (1510–1589)

Charles Dançay (1510–1589) was a French diplomat, the envoy of France to Denmark and Sweden (based in Denmark) from the reign of Henry II of France onward.

He was under order to create peace between the Nordic nations, and contributed to peace between Sweden and Denmark after the Northern Seven Years' War. In 1572, he participated in the preparations of a plot with the Swedish opposition to John III of Sweden, channeled through Charles de Mornay, to depose the king in favor of the future Henry III of France, a plan which was approved at the French royal court, but the election of Henry to the Polish throne discontinued these plans. In 1574, he helped Henry escape from Poland. He was under order to increase French influence in the Nordic nations, and negotiated for a French-Swedish marriage alliance (between Henry III and Princess Elizabeth of Sweden), but these plans was discontinued by the marriage between Henry and Louise of Lorraine in 1575.
