= Charles de Mornay =

Swedish court official (1514–1574)

Charles de Mornay (1514 – 4 September 1574), was a Swedish court official, diplomat and royal favorite. He was the central figure of the Mornay plot of 1574.

Charles de Mornay was a French nobleman and Huguenot Calvinist. He served in the French troops in Scotland from 1547 to 1550. Between 1557 and 1559, he served as Swedish envoy to Poland–Lithuania, Denmark–Norway and England, during the marriage negotiations between queen Elizabeth I of England and Eric XIV of Sweden. In 1559, he was the courtier who informed Eric about his the affair between Princess Cecilia of Sweden and her brother-in-law, which resulted in the famous scandal known as the 'Vadstena Rumble'. He was a favorite of Eric XIV. He was an envoy to France and Scotland in 1561–62 during the negotiations of a marriage between Eric XIV and Mary Stuart, served as the king's adviser and member of the royal council. He served as a military commander in the Northern Seven Years' War. He was a prisoner in Denmark 1566–71, and was invited to return to the royal council by John III of Sweden.

In the autumn of 1573, a plot was prepared to assassinate John III. The plot was led by de Mornay, who was in contact with Christina of Denmark and the French ambassador in Copenhagen Charles Dançay. John III was to be killed during a sword dance performed by Scottish mercenaries at the party which was to be given in October that year before the mercenaries' departure to the Baltic. After the assassination, the king's brother Duke Charles was to be placed upon the throne. De Mornay, who had previously been the favorite of Eric XIV, promised that he knew the location of Eric's alleged hidden gold reserve, which he would reveal after the coup in exchange for better conditions for Eric in prison. However, the plot did not materialize as de Mornay lost his nerve and never gave the sign to the mercenaries to take action.

In September 1574, the plot was revealed and de Mornay was arrested, interrogated and executed. It was never made clear who participated in the plot. However, it is noted that the suspected conspirators Hogenskild Bielke, Gustaf Banér and Pontus De la Gardie often gathered at meetings in the apartment of Princess Elizabeth of Sweden, meetings where Princess Cecilia of Sweden had also frequently been seen, and the two sisters and their brother Charles were somewhat compromised though they were never accused. De Mornay also revealed that one of the things which was agreed upon by the conspirators was to raise the dowry of Elizabeth from 100,000 to 150,000, so to make it possible for her to make a marriage of higher status. It is noted that the marriage between Elizabeth and Henry III of France, which was officially suggested in 1574, could have been informally suggested through Charles already the year before, and that the French ambassador had expressed himself impressed by everything regarding Elizabeth with the exception of her dowry.

== Sources ==
- Ingvar Andersson: Charles de Mornay i Svenskt biografiskt lexikon (1945)
