= Archibald Ruthven =

Scottish nobleman (1546–1578) in Swedish service

Archibald Ruthven of Forteviot and Master of Ruthven
- Born: 1546; Forteviot, Perthshire, Scotland
- Died: February 1578 (aged 31–32); Västerås, Sweden
- Relatives: Patrick Ruthven, 3rd Lord Ruthven, father; William Ruthven, 1st Earl of Gowrie, brother
- Military career
- Allegiance: King's Men; Sweden
- Branch: Foot
- Rank: Colonel

Archibald Ruthven of Forteviot and Master of Ruthven (1546-1578), was a Scottish nobleman who raised a Scottish force for Swedish service in Estonia. There his men and the German soldiers in Swedish service fought a serious battle with each other; many hundred Scotsmen being killed. The Scots were blamed for the disaster, and, although wounded by his own men, Ruthven was imprisoned. As a prisoner in Sweden he was accused of having participated in a conspiracy to assassinate King John III of Sweden. Others implicated in the plot were executed, but Ruthven was kept a prisoner in Vasteras, where he died.

== Early life ==
The Master of Ruthven was the son of Patrick Ruthven, 3rd Lord Ruthven, and brother of William Ruthven, 1st Earl of Gowrie. At the age of 14, he became one of the ten Scottish hostages delivered to the English in accordance with the Treaty of Berwick 1560.

== Swedish service ==
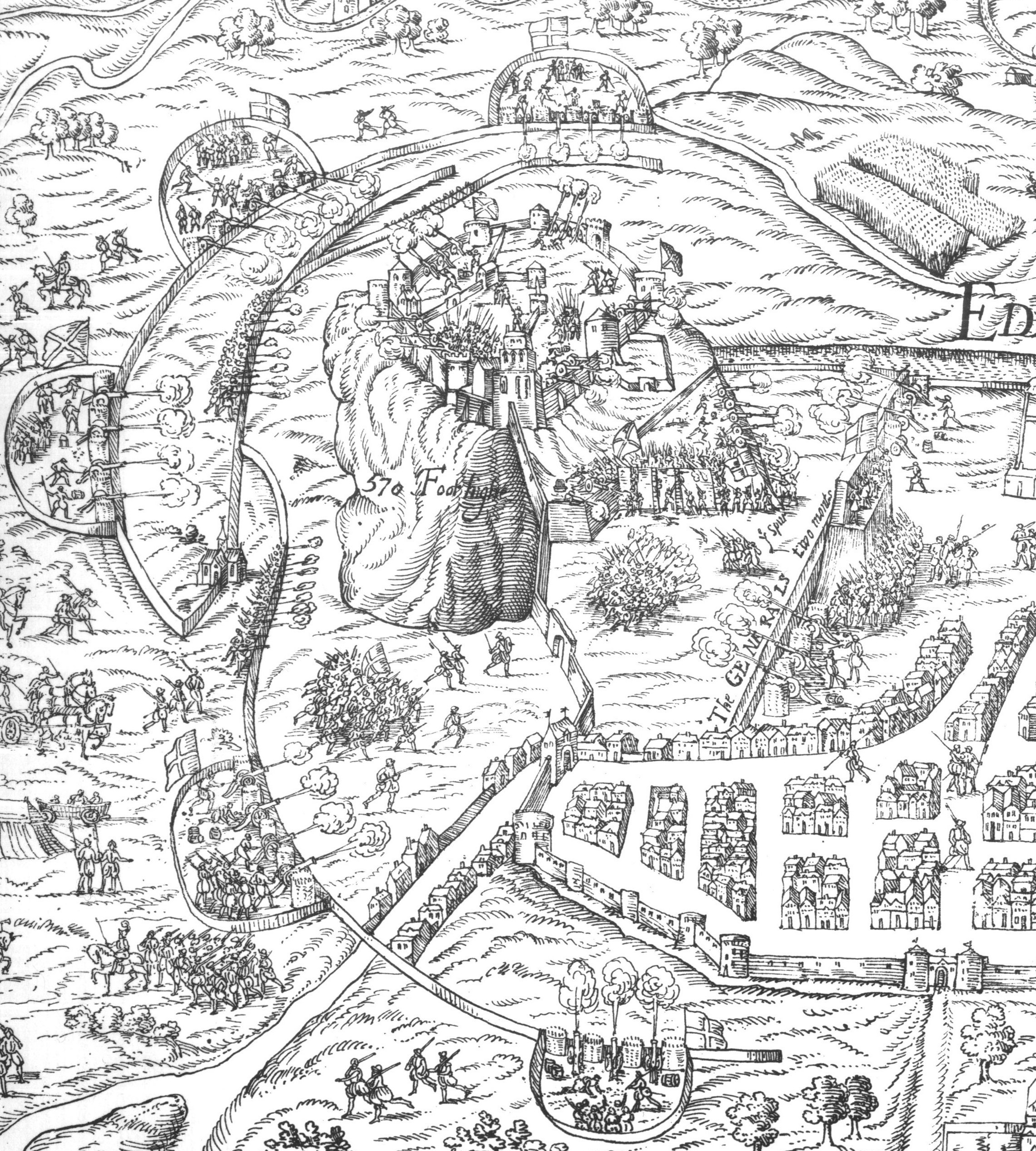
Edinburgh Castle during the Lang Siege.

In 1572, Ruthven was recommended to King John III of Sweden by the Regent of Scotland, the Earl of Mar. He therefore went to Sweden and met the Swedish king in Vadstena. John III gave him the mission to return to Scotland and recruit 2,000 soldiers. In Scotland, Ruthven on 4 July 1573 received the permission of the Privy Council of Scotland, to recruit 1,600 soldiers for Swedish service; provided that he did not entice any men from the King's service, nor use any constraint or deceit. He was also forbidden to serve against any Protestant power. In the meantime, Ruthven had participated in the Lang Siege and capture of Edinburgh Castle that fell on 28 May.

Ruthven had raised substantially more men than the 1,600 men allowed by the Privy Council; 3,000 foot and 760 horse arrived at Älvsborg, on the Swedish west coast, in June and July 1573. The force were split up into small units and marched to Sweden's eastern coast. Overdue pay caused some of the soldiery to delay their march, pillage the countryside and revolt against Ruthven. Upon their arrival in Stockholm and ports in Östergötland, they were joined by another 300 Scottish cavalry and shipped to Reval, where they arrived in September and joined with Swedish and Finnish regulars as well as German mercenaries, primarily consisting of cavalry and artillery. In November, the army left for Wesenberg under the overall command of Clas Åkesson Tott and field command of Pontus de la Gardie. The march was again delayed by the Scottish troops, who demanded to be paid a month in advance, causing de la Gardie to sell part of his jewelry to satisfy their claims.

== Disaster at Wesenberg ==
In January 1574, Wesenberg Castle, which was held by the Russians, was stormed twice but without success. In the third assault of 2 March 1574, the Swedish forces lost at least 1,000 men. Subsequent Swedish attempts to dig mines and set the town on fire likewise failed. De la Gardie withdrew part of the besieging army for expeditions to nearby Tolsberg and Dorpat both of which were unsuccessful. The besieging forces were demoralized, supplies ran out and tensions grew; the German troops blamed the failures on a lack of Scottish support. On 17 March, a brawl between German and Scottish soldiers occurred. A German officer tried to intervene, but when he was unsuccessful and the brawl turned into an open fight, de la Gardie, Tott and Ruthven arrived to the scene in person. They were however likewise attacked and fled, with Ruthven suffering severe injuries.

When the commanders had fled the scene, Scottish troops attacked the German artillery, seized the guns and took aim at the German cavalry. The German horse charged, however, and cut down the Scots. The result was 30 dead Germans and several hundred dead Scots. The German and Swedish foot stood by without taking action, neither did the Scottish horse intervene. Several Scottish officers were among the dead, including David Murray, Jacob Murray and George Michell. About 70 Scots escaped to the Russian forces in Wesenberg, the last record of them is that they were subsequently brought to Moscow. The Swedish army had to abort the siege, and the Swedish campaign ended in a dismal failure.

== Conspiracy trial ==
A court of inquiry found the Scots troops responsible for the disaster at Wesenberg, and the wounded Ruthven and his second-in-command, Gilbert Balfour, were taken as prisoners to Stockholm. In the Swedish capital, they found themselves implicated in the Mornay plot to assassinate King John III. De Mornay, Ruthven and Balfour were tried before a court of eight members of the Privy Council of Sweden and 15 noblemen. De Mornay was sentenced to death and executed on the Great Market in Stockholm on 4 September 1574. Balfour was also sentenced to lose his life, his honour and his goods, but the judgment was not immediately implemented; he being kept in prison during the trial of Ruthven.

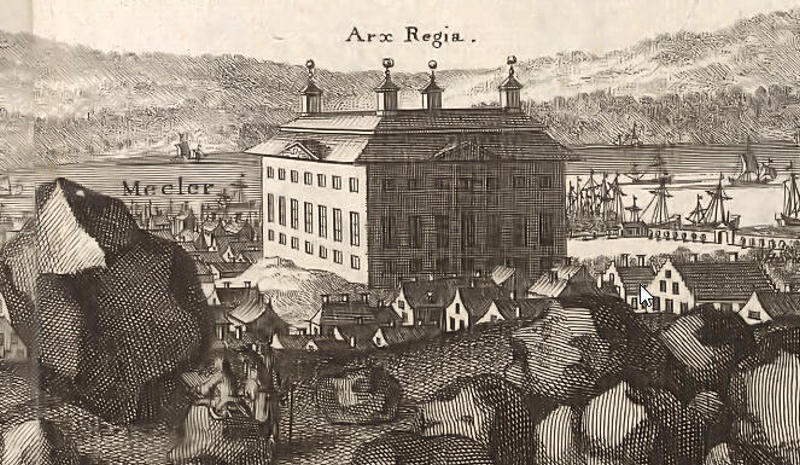
Västerås Castle in the 17th century.

In prison, Ruthven repeatedly petitioned the King, the Queen, and De la Gardie, declaring his innocence, claiming that he had first heard of it in Reval. The Scottish government pled for the prisoners; the Regent of Scotland, the Earl of Morton wrote to the Swedish king, and sent an envoy to Stockholm. King John III, who feared international complications, or even war with Scotland, stayed the execution until it after many delays took place in August of 1576. Ruthven was kept a prisoner at Västerås Castle, but was allowed a couple of servants, and could walk freely in town and to church. Yet, when Balfour in the spring of 1576 tried to escape, he was kept imprisoned under a stricter regimen. The last five months of his life, he did, however, stay with a citizen of the town, where he died in February 1578.
