= 1569 =

1569 in various calendars
- Gregorian calendar: 1569; MDLXIX
- Ab urbe condita: 2322
- Armenian calendar: 1018; ԹՎ ՌԺԸ
- Assyrian calendar: 6319
- Balinese saka calendar: 1490–1491
- Bengali calendar: 975–976
- Berber calendar: 2519
- English Regnal year: 11 Eliz. 1 – 12 Eliz. 1
- Buddhist calendar: 2113
- Burmese calendar: 931
- Byzantine calendar: 7077–7078
- Chinese calendar: 戊辰年 (Earth Dragon); 4266 or 4059 — to — 己巳年 (Earth Snake); 4267 or 4060
- Coptic calendar: 1285–1286
- Discordian calendar: 2735
- Ethiopian calendar: 1561–1562
- Hebrew calendar: 5329–5330
- Hindu calendars
- Vikram Samvat: 1625–1626
- Shaka Samvat: 1490–1491
- Kali Yuga: 4669–4670
- Holocene calendar: 11569
- Igbo calendar: 569–570
- Iranian calendar: 947–948
- Islamic calendar: 976–977
- Japanese calendar: Eiroku 12 (永禄１２年)
- Javanese calendar: 1488–1489
- Julian calendar: 1569; MDLXIX
- Korean calendar: 3902
- Minguo calendar: 343 before ROC 民前343年
- Nanakshahi calendar: 101
- Thai solar calendar: 2111–2112
- Tibetan calendar: ས་ཕོ་འབྲུག་ལོ་ (male Earth-Dragon); 1695 or 1314 or 542 — to — ས་མོ་སྦྲུལ་ལོ་ (female Earth-Snake); 1696 or 1315 or 543

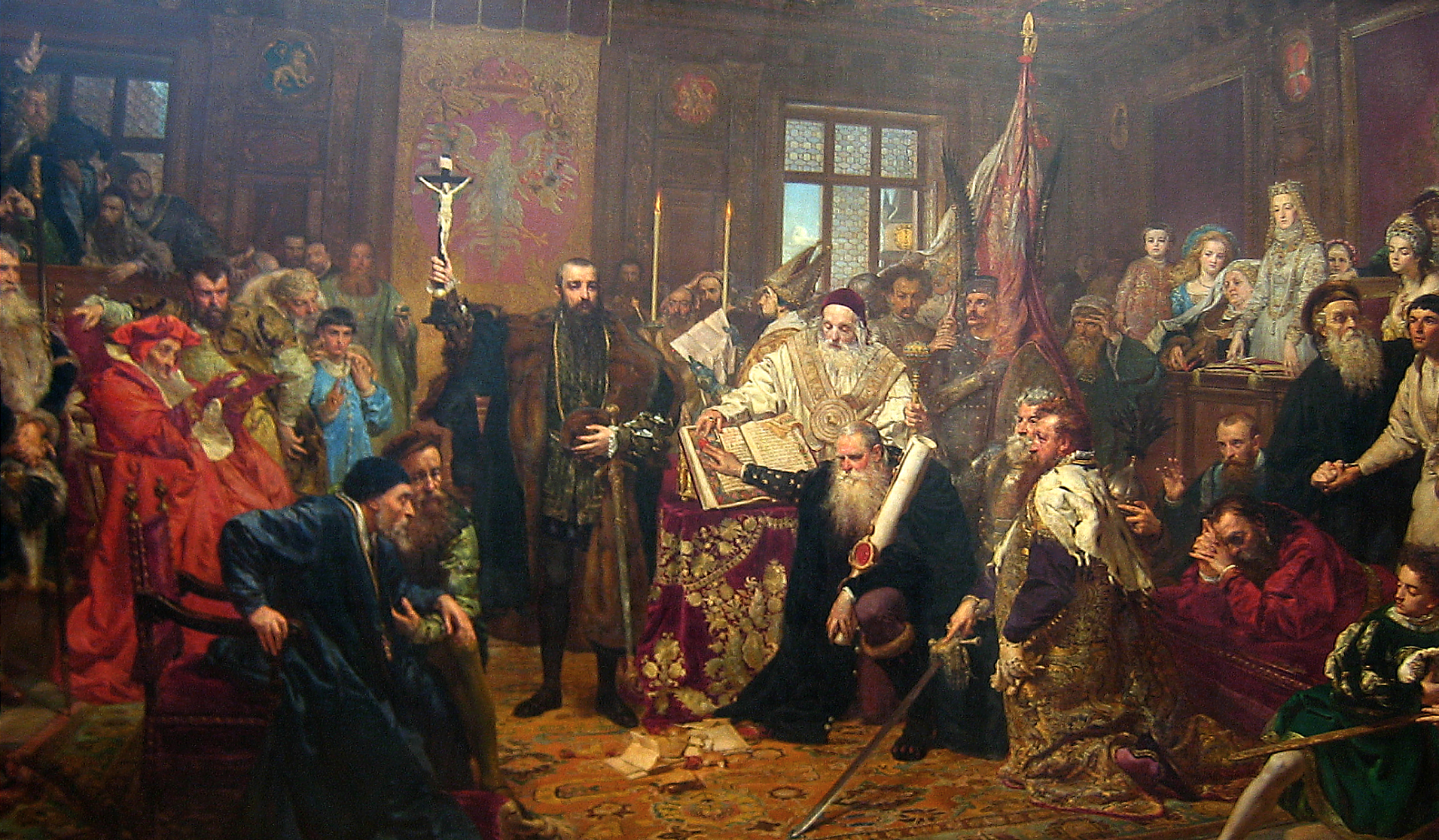
July 1: Union of Lublin

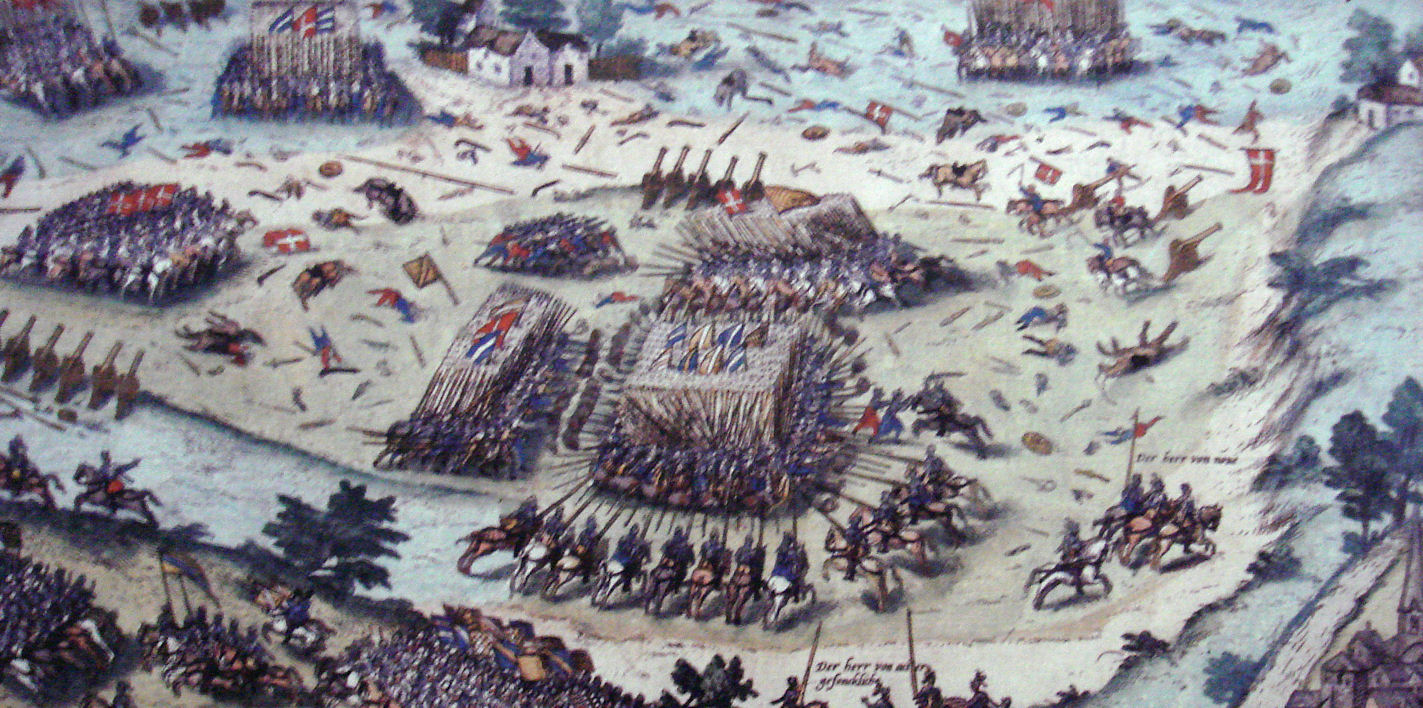
October 3: Battle of Moncontour

Year 1569 (MDLXIX) was a common year starting on Saturday of the Julian calendar.

== Events ==
=== January–March ===
- January 11 — The first recorded lottery in England begins and continues, nonstop, at the west door of St Paul's Cathedral in London until May 6, when the winner is drawn. Each share costs ten shillings, and proceeds are used to repair harbours, and for other public works.
- February 26 — Pope Pius V issues a papal bull expelling all Jews from Italian and French territories.
- March 13 – Battle of Jarnac: Royalist troops under Marshal Gaspard de Tavannes surprise and defeat the Huguenots under Louis I, Prince of Condé, who is captured and murdered. A substantial proportion of the Huguenot army manages to escape, under Gaspard II de Coligny.

=== April–June ===
- April 15 – Burmese–Siamese War: Mahinthrathirat reclaims the throne of the Ayutthaya Kingdom (modern Thailand) upon the death of King Maha Chakkraphat.
- May 8 – King Bayinnaung of Burma puts down the revolt by Setthathirath of Lan Xang (modern Laos), and ending Lan Xang's attempt to rescue Thailand's Ayutthaya Kingdom from conquest.
- May 31 – Kasim Pasha of the Ottoman Empire begins the Ottoman attempt to conquer Astrakhan with tens of thousands of troops and a plan to build a canal between the Black Sea to the Caspian Sea to send Ottoman ships on the conquest. The attempt to build a canal proves to be unfeasible.
- June 10 – German Protestant troops reinforce Coligny, near Limoges.

=== July–September ===
- July 1 – The Union of Lublin unites the Kingdom of Poland and the Grand Duchy of Lithuania into a single state, the Polish–Lithuanian Commonwealth, following votes in the Assemblies of three Lithuanian provinces (Volhynia, Ukraine and Podlasie) in favour of the incorporation.
- July 24 – Huguenot forces under Gaspard II de Coligny and 15-year-old Prince Henry of Navarre begin the siege of Poitiers, a Roman Catholic stronghold. The siege fails and the Huguenots depart on September 7.
- August 2 – Burma invades Siam and captures Ayutthaya. Siam becomes a vassal of Burma.
- August 24 – Battle of Orthez: Huguenot forces under Gabriel de Lorges, Count of Montgomery defeat Royalist forces under General Terride, in French Navarre. Catholics surrender under the condition that their lives will be spared. Huguenots agree, but then massacre the Catholics anyway.
- August 27 – The Grand Duchy of Tuscany is formed.
- September 7 – A Royalist army under the Duc d'Anjou and Marshal Tavannes forces Coligny to abandon the siege of Poitiers.
- September 17 – Pope Pius V issues the papal bull Consueverunt Romani Pontifices setting specific elements for the devotion of the Rosary.
- September 26 – Kasim Pasha ends his attempt to conquer Astrakhan after realizing that his troops have only one month's supply of food left.
- September 28 – The first complete printed Bible in a Spanish translation (La Biblia), made by Casiodoro de Reina, is published in Basel.
- September 29 – Maha Thammarachathirat is installed by the Burmese Army as the vassal king of Ayutthaya.

=== October–December ===
- October 3 – Battle of Moncontour: The Royalist forces of Gaspard de Saulx Tavannes and the Duc d'Anjou defeat Gaspard II de Coligny's Huguenots, killing 8,000 and taking 3,000 prisoner.
- November 9 – The Rising of the North begins in England as the Earl of Westmorland and the Earl of Northumberland, both Catholic nobles, set off from Brancepeth Castle in County Durham with 700 men, in hopes of overthrowing Queen Elizabeth I and placing the Catholic Mary, Queen of Scots, on the English throne.
- November 11 — Danish General Daniel Rantzau arrives at the Swedish-held Varberg castle at Halland and orders his artillery to shell the castle with cannon fire. The Swedish defenders fire back with their own artillery and Rantzau's head is taken off by a cannonball on the first day.
- November 14 — The siege of Varberg Castle by Denmark ends after three days of shelling the Swedish defenders.
- November 26 — Francisco Álvarez de Toledo becomes the new Spanish Viceroy of Peru, succeeding Lope García de Castro as the governor-general of all Spanish territory in South America.
- December 2 — The Catholic army of the Duc d'Anjou inflicts another defeat on the Huguenots of Coligny, successfully besieging Saint-Jean-d'Angély.
- December 6 — The Kanbara castle, held by the Hōjō clan in what becomes the Shizuoka Prefecture of Japan falls after a siege by Takeda Katsuyori of the Takeda clan. Hōjō Ujinobu, who had 1,000 men defending, commits suicide after the defeat.
- December 13 — An English counterattack against the Northern rebels begins as Thomas Radclyffe, 3rd Earl of Sussex, marches from York with 10,000 men against the rebels' 6,000. The rebels disperse and flee northward back to Scotland, ending the Rising of the North.

=== Dates unknown ===
- The Mercator projection is first used in Gerardus Mercator's world map, Nova et Aucta Orbis Terrae Descriptio ad Usum Navigantium Emendata.
- 1569 Plot: The first of three conspiracies with the intent to depose John III of Sweden and reinstate the imprisoned Eric XIV on the Swedish throne is exposed in Sweden.
- The trade compact of 1536 is renewed, exempting French merchants from Ottoman law, and allowing them to travel, buy and sell throughout the sultan's dominions, and to pay low customs duties on French imports and exports.
- Mughal Emperor Akbar founds Fatehpur Sikri, to honor the Muslim holy man Shaikh Salim Chisti, who has foretold the birth of Akbar's son and heir, Jahangir.

== Births ==
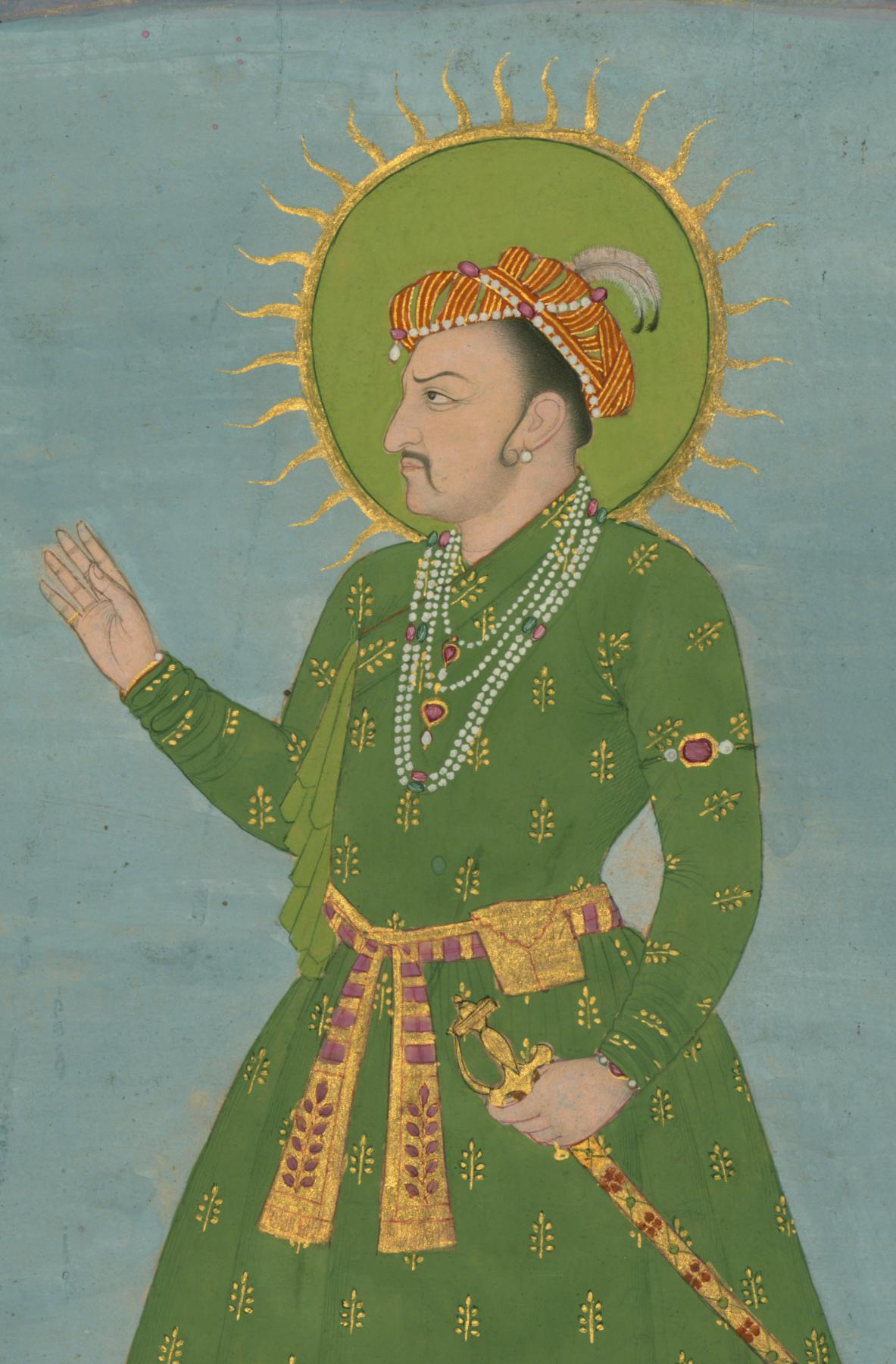
Jahangir

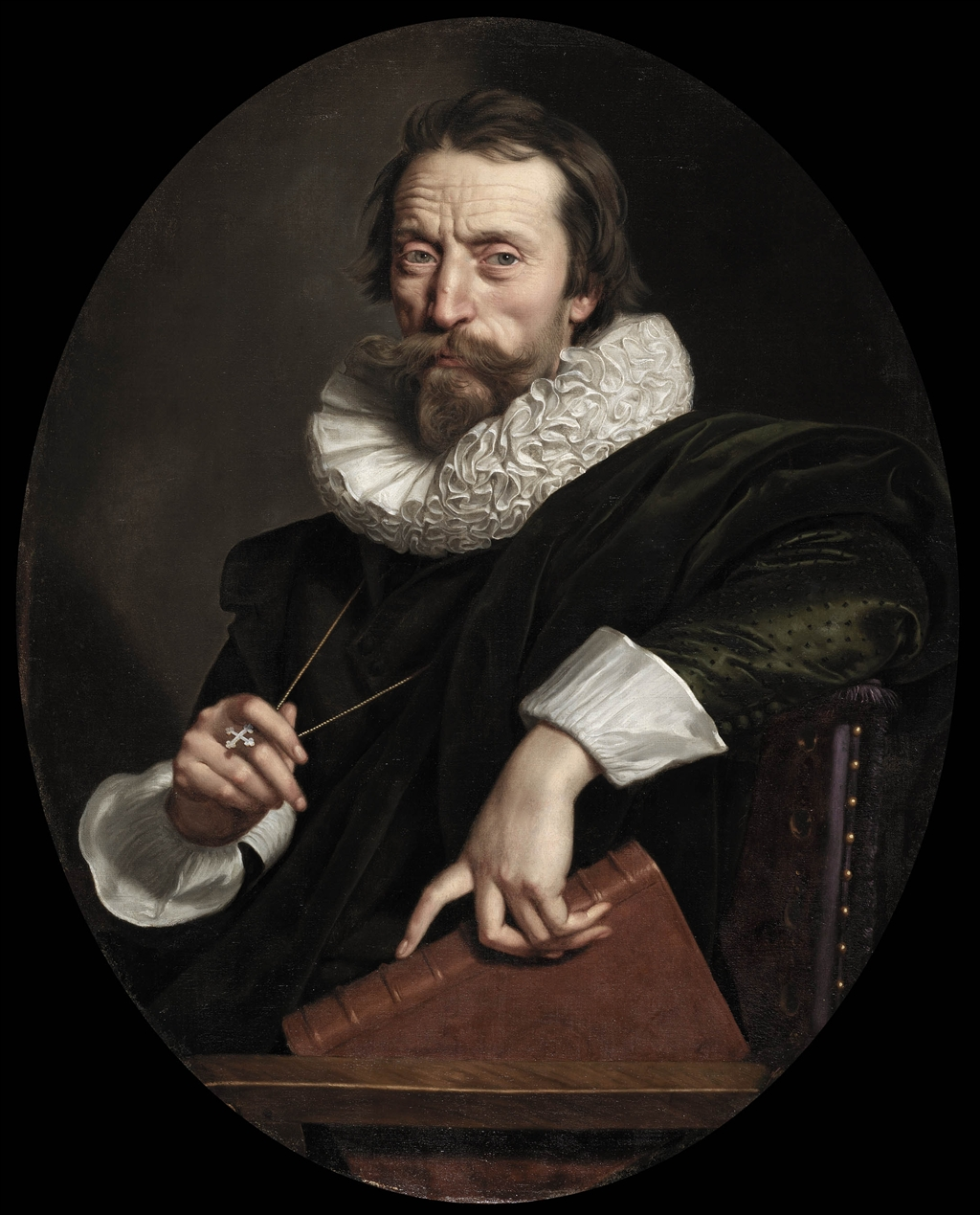
Giambattista Marino

- January 20 – Heribert Rosweyde, Jesuit hagiographer (d. 1629)
- January 22 – Lucio Massari, Italian painter (d. 1633)
- February 13 – Johann Reinhard I, Count of Hanau-Lichtenberg (d. 1625)
- March 28 – Ranuccio I Farnese, Duke of Parma (d. 1622)
- March 29 – John Suckling, English politician (d. 1627)
- April 10 – Countess Emilia of Nassau, German countess (d. 1629)
- April 15 – Joan Shakespeare, William Shakespeare's sister (d. 1646)
- April 16 – John Davies, English poet and lawyer (d. 1626)
- May 20 – Juan de la Cerda, 6th Duke of Medinaceli, Spanish noble (d. 1607)
- June 1 – Sophia of Holstein-Gottorp, Regent of Mecklenburg-Schwerin (1603–1608) (d. 1634)
- June 30 – Hedwig of Hesse-Kassel, countess consort of Schaumburg (d. 1644)
- July 3 – Thomas Richardson, English politician and judge (d. 1635)
- July 19 – Conrad Vorstius, Dutch theologian (d. 1622)
- July 30 – Karl I, Prince of Liechtenstein (d. 1627)
- August 31 – Jahangir, Mughal emperor (d. 1627)
- September – Arthur Lake, English bishop, a translator of the King James Bible (d. 1626)
- September 5 – Georg Friedrich of Hohenlohe-Neuenstein-Weikersheim, officer and amateur poet (d. 1645)
- September 9 – Joachim Andreas von Schlick, Czech leader (d. 1621)
- September 23 – Tachibana Ginchiyo, female samurai leader of the Tachibana clan in Japan (d. 1602)
- September 24 – Ernst of Schaumburg, Count of Holstein-Pinneberg and Schaumburg (1601–1622) (d. 1622)
- September 27 – John Percy, English priest (d. 1641)
- October 13 – Claude de Bullion, French Minister of Finance (d. 1640)
- October 14 – Giambattista Marino, Italian poet (d. 1625)
- November 5 – Nils Turesson Bielke, Swedish politician (d. 1639)
- November 11 – Martin Ruland the Younger, German alchemist (d. 1611)
- November 16 – Paul Sartorius, German composer (d. 1609)
- November 18 – Antonio Marcello Barberini, Italian cardinal and the younger brother of Maffeo Barberini (d. 1646)
- November 24 – Francis Ashley, English politician (d. 1635)
- December 15 – Muzio Oddi, Italian mathematician (d. 1639)
- December 18 – Jakob Hassler, German composer (d. 1622)
- December 22 – Étienne Martellange, French architect (d. 1641)
- December 31 – Anna de' Medici, Tuscan princess (d. 1584)
- date unknown
  - Guillén de Castro y Bellvis, Spanish dramatist (d. 1631)
  - William Monson, British admiral (d. 1643)
  - Frans Pourbus the Younger, Flemish painter (d. 1622)
  - Yodo-dono, Japanese concubine of Toyotomi Hideyoshi (d. 1615)

== Deaths ==
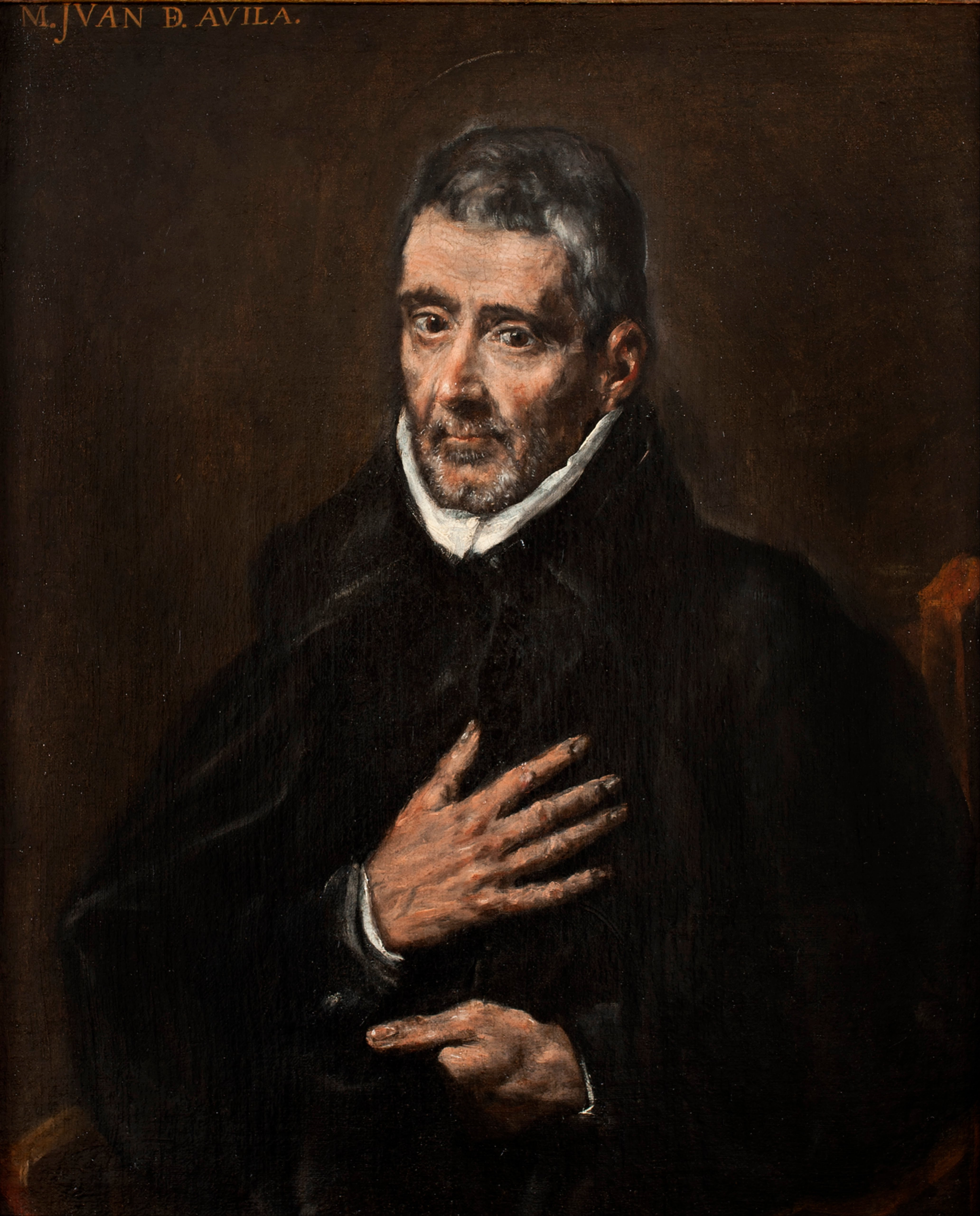
Saint John of Ávila

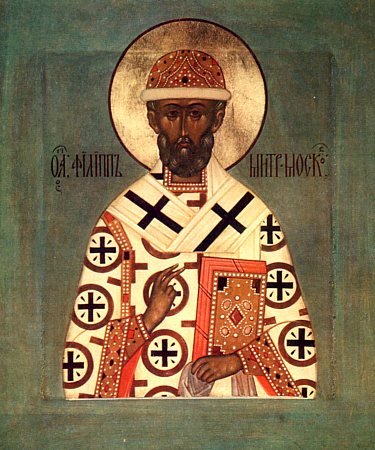
Philip II, Metropolitan of Moscow

- January 15 – Catherine Carey, English lady-in-waiting to Queen Elizabeth I (b. 1524)
- January 20 – Myles Coverdale, English Bible translator (b. c. 1488)
- March 13 – Louis I, Prince of Condé, French Protestant general, executed (b. 1530)
- March 17 – Karl Christoph, Duke of Münsterberg (b. 1545)
- April 15 –Maha Chakkraphat, Siamese King of the Ayutthaya Kingdom (b. 1509)
- May 10 – John of Ávila, Spanish mystic and saint (b. 1500)
- May 16 – Dirk Willems, Dutch Anabaptist martyr
- May 17 – Georg, Count Palatine of Simmern-Sponheim (b. 1518)
- May 26 – Vidus Vidius, Italian surgeon and anatomist (b. 1509)
- May 27 – François de Coligny d'Andelot, French general (b. 1521)
- June 11 – Wolfgang, Count Palatine of Zweibrücken (b. 1526)
- September 5
  - Edmund Bonner, Bishop of London (b. c. 1500)
  - Bernardo Tasso, Italian courtier and poet (b. 1493)
- September 9 – Pieter Bruegel the Elder, Flemish painter
- September 11 – Vincenza Armani, Italian actress (b. 1530)
- October 3 – Philibert, Margrave of Baden-Baden (b. 1536)
- October 9 – Vladimir of Staritsa, Russian prince (b. 1533)
- October 28 – Ludovica Torelli, Count of Guastalla (b. 1500)
- November 24 – Celio Secondo Curione, Italian humanist (b. 1503)
- November 29 – António Ferreira, Portuguese poet (b. 1528)
- December 10 – Paul Eber, German Lutheran theologian (b. 1511)
- December 15 – Ludowika Margaretha of Zweibrücken-Bitsch, spouse of Count Philip V of Hanau-Lichtenberg (b. 1540)
- December 23 – Philip II, Metropolitan of Moscow (b. 1507)
- date unknown
  - Janet Beaton, Scottish noble (b. 1519)
  - Elin Andersdotter, Swedish lady-in-waiting and political conspirator
  - Gracia Mendes Nasi, Ottoman businessperson and philanthropist (b. 1510)
  - Mahinthrathirat, Ayutthaya king (b. 1539)
