= Siege of Narva (1581) =

Siege of Narva in 1581

- Part of the Livonian War
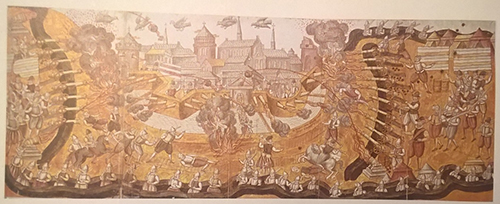
- Illustration of the siege by Rudolf van Deventer
Date	4–6 September 1581
Location	Narva
Result	Swedish victory
Territorial changes	Russia is cut off from the Baltic Sea

Belligerents
Kingdom of Sweden	Tsardom of Russia

Commanders and leaders
Pontus De la Gardie; Carl Henriksson Horn	Unknown

Units involved
Unknown	(Tsardom of Russia) Narva garrison

Strength
7,000–8,000 men 2,400 cavalry	Unknown

Casualties and losses
100 men	4,000–7,000 soldiers and civilians

The siege of Narva was a siege and massacre initiated by Pontus De la Gardie against the Russian-controlled city of Narva in present-day Estonia. The siege resulted in a victory for the Swedes.

== Background ==
Pontus De la Gardie

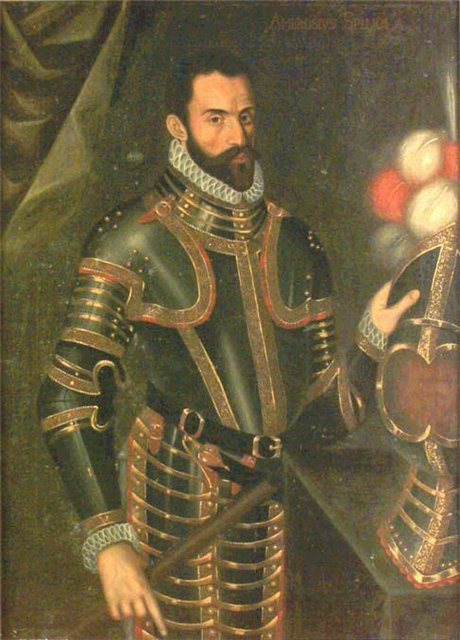
Portrait of Pontus De la Gardie (1520-1585)

=== Beginning of the campaign ===
After having stayed at Kexholm over Christmas, Pontus De la Gardie decides to renew his campaign against the Russians in the new year. Because of the harsh winter, the entire Gulf of Finland froze over, which allowed Pontus to march across it, from Viborg to Wesenberg with around 3,000–4,000 men.

=== Capture of Wesenberg ===
When he arrived at Wesenberg, he began bombarding it with "glowing bullets" which began large fires inside the fortress, despite this, the defenders showed a strong will to defend it. However, when heavy siege artillery arrived from Reval, the defenders began negotiations and on March 4 the fortress capitulated and the defenders were allowed to depart freely. Tolsburg also fell 4 days later, after which Pontus went to the king to discuss the continuation of his campaign.

=== Prelude to the siege ===
The circumstances at the time created very favorable timing for a Swedish offensive since the Tsar's troops were tied up fighting the Tatars and the Poles. Pontus managed to convince the Swedish king to, in an emergency, call up troops if any opportunities arose.

In late May, Pontus was stationed in Sweden while he prepared for the upcoming campaign towards Narva, including constant food transportation to the front from local ports. Pontus was quickly appointed supreme governor of Estonia, and on August 3, Clas Åkesson Tott, Pontus, Göran Boije, Mårten Boije, Erik Bertilsson Slang, and Arvid Henriksson Tawast gathered in Helsinki for a war council. Pontus was shortly present in Reval, where he sent auxiliary troops to Carl Horn who was besieging Hapsal.

== Siege ==
With the support of the Swedish fleet, Pontus and Carl Horn went to the Eastern Front, They had 7,000–8,000 men and 2,400 cavalry at their disposal. On 4 September, the Swedish siege artillery began its bombardment of Narva, they continuously bombarded the walls almost non-stop for 3 days, and the Swedish fleet also blocked off any aid from the sea. Pontus ordered the construction of zigzagging trenches approaching the walls of the city of which he placed mortars inside which were capable of sending shells over the walls. On 6 September, Pontus sent a letter asking if the city wished to capitulate, but he received a strong refusal back, at which point he decided to storm the walls.

The troops were motivated after Pontus granted them 24 hours of free plundering in the city, on the terms that churches and women be spared, and that only "quick and brave" people were allowed to participate. When the Swedes stormed the walls, they quickly gained success, however, the fighting was not very extensive, as only around 100 men died on the Swedish side. As soon as the troops had gotten inside the city, any remaining thoughts on the plundering restrictions were suppressed. Instead, a relentless and bloody massacre began, with nobody being spared. In a letter by Pontus to the king, he describes it as:

män föllo, kvinnor föllo, barn föllo, inga skonades, såsom seden är

Translation:

men fell, women fell, children fell, none were spared, as is the custom

In a letter from September 22 by John III to his sister, he states that 4,000 people were killed in Narva. Earlier research has put the number to upwards of 7,000.

== Aftermath ==
Through the Swedish conquest of the city, the Russians were once again closed off from the Baltic Sea. The conquest also forced the Tsar to acknowledge his defeat and sign a humiliating treaty only 2 years later.
