= Pontus De la Gardie =

French nobleman and general (c. 1520–1585)

Baron Pontus De la Gardie
- Ponce d'Escouperie
- Born: c. 1520; Caunes-Minervois, France
- Died: 5 November 1585 (aged approx. 65); Narva River
- Cause of death: Drowning
- Burial place: St Mary's Cathedral of Tallinn
- Children: Brita Pontusdotter De la Gardie; Johan De la Gardie; Jacob De la Gardie
- Relatives: De la Gardie family
- Military career
- Allegiance: Kingdom of Denmark; Kingdom of Sweden
- Service years: 1565–1585
- Rank: Fältmarskalk
- Conflicts: Northern Seven Years' War; Livonian War; Siege of Wesenberg (1574); Siege of Narva (1581)

Baron Pontus De la Gardie (c. 1520 – 5 November 1585) was a French-born military commander, privy councillor, and diplomat in Swedish service. Originally fighting for Denmark, he was captured during the Northern Seven Years' War in 1565 and switched allegiances to Sweden. He played a key role in elevating John III to the throne in 1568, later establishing the prominent De la Gardie noble family through his marriage to the king's daughter, Sofia Johansdotter Gyllenhielm.

As Commander-in-Chief during the Livonian War, De la Gardie led Swedish campaigns against Russia, securing Estonia and Ingria after the capture of Narva. Widely regarded as the most renowned Swedish military commander of the 16th century, he was credited with much of the country's military success in the 1580s, demonstrating tactical ingenuity by using zigzag-shaped saps during the siege of Narva. Shortly after concluding peace terms with Russia, De la Gardie drowned in the Narva River in 1585.

== Life and career ==
He was born Ponce d'Escouperie in Caunes-Minervois (Aude), Languedoc, a son of Jacques Escoperier and X Armengaud. As a youngster, he wanted to become a priest and was educated in a monastery. He changed his mind, however, and left Languedoc to become a mercenary in the service of Denmark. De la Gardie was promoted to officer and was in charge of a regiment of mercenaries. In 1565, during the Northern Seven Years' War, he was captured by Swedish troops at Varberg and changed allegiance to Sweden. De la Gardie quickly became a favourite of John III of Sweden and in 1569, after only four years in the Swedish service, he received nobility status. In 1571, he was created a baron and was given Ekholmen Castle.

=== Alleged involvement in Mornay plot ===
He was suspected to have taken part in the Mornay plot to assassinate John III. The plot was led by Charles de Mornay, who was in contact with Christina of Denmark and the French ambassador in Copenhagen Charles Dancay. John III was to be killed during a sword dance performed by Scottish mercenaries at the party which was to be given in October that year before the Scottish mercenaries departure to the Baltic. After the assassination, the king's brother Duke Charles was to be placed upon the throne. The plot did not materialize as de Mornay lost his nerve and never gave the sign to the mercenaries to take action. In September 1574, the plot was revealed and Charles de Mornay was arrested, interrogated and executed. It was never made clear who participated in the plot. However, it is noted that the suspected conspirators Hogenskild Bielke, Gustaf Banér and Pontus De la Gardie often gathered at meetings in the apartment of Princess Elizabeth of Sweden, meetings where Princess Cecilia of Sweden had also frequently been seen, and the two sisters and their brother Charles were somewhat compromised though they were never accused. Pontus De la Gardie was himself never put on trial for his suspected involvement in the affair.

=== Service during the Livonian War ===
After Clas Åkesson Tott's resignation as the supreme commander of the Swedish forces in Finland and Estonia as a consequence of the Siege of Wesenberg during the Livonian War, de la Gardie took over Tott's office. De la Gardie's skills, combined with the fact that Sweden's enemy Russia had to transfer troops to defend against Polish attacks further south, led to considerable military success for Sweden during the following years. In the fall of 1580, Karelia was conquered. De la Gardie led his troops over the frozen Gulf of Finland to capture the fortresses of Wesenberg (now Rakvere) and Tolsburg (now Toolse). In September 1581, Narva was taken after a storming that had been preceded by a massive bombardment. 4,000 soldiers and civilians were killed, pointing out the fact that De la Gardie was not only a skillful warrior, but a cruel and hard commander as well. De la Gardie and his Swedish troops went on to capture the fortress of Ivangorod and several other fortresses that autumn. In 1582, the war with Russia ended and Sweden got to keep the conquests made in Karelia and Ingria, but had to withdraw from Livonia.

De la Gardie drowned in the Narva River and is buried in St Mary's Cathedral of Tallinn. His tomb chest is made by well-known artist and architect Arent Passer.

== Family ==
On 4 February 1580, De la Gardie married Sofia Johansdotter Gyllenhielm (c. 1556–1583), the illegitimate daughter of John III of Sweden and a Finnish lady, Karin Hansdotter. During the wedding, a gallery in the church collapsed and one person was killed. Some sceptics claimed it was a bad omen or a divine act with which God condemned the marriage.

Pontus De la Gardie and Sofia Gyllenhielm had three children:

- Brita Pontusdotter De la Gardie (1581–1645)
- Baron Johan De la Gardie (1582–1642), statesman of the Swedish Empire
- Count and Field Marshal Jacob De la Gardie (1583–1652)
