= Siege of Wesenberg (1574) =

1574 military conflict in Estonia during Livonian War

- Part of the Livonian War
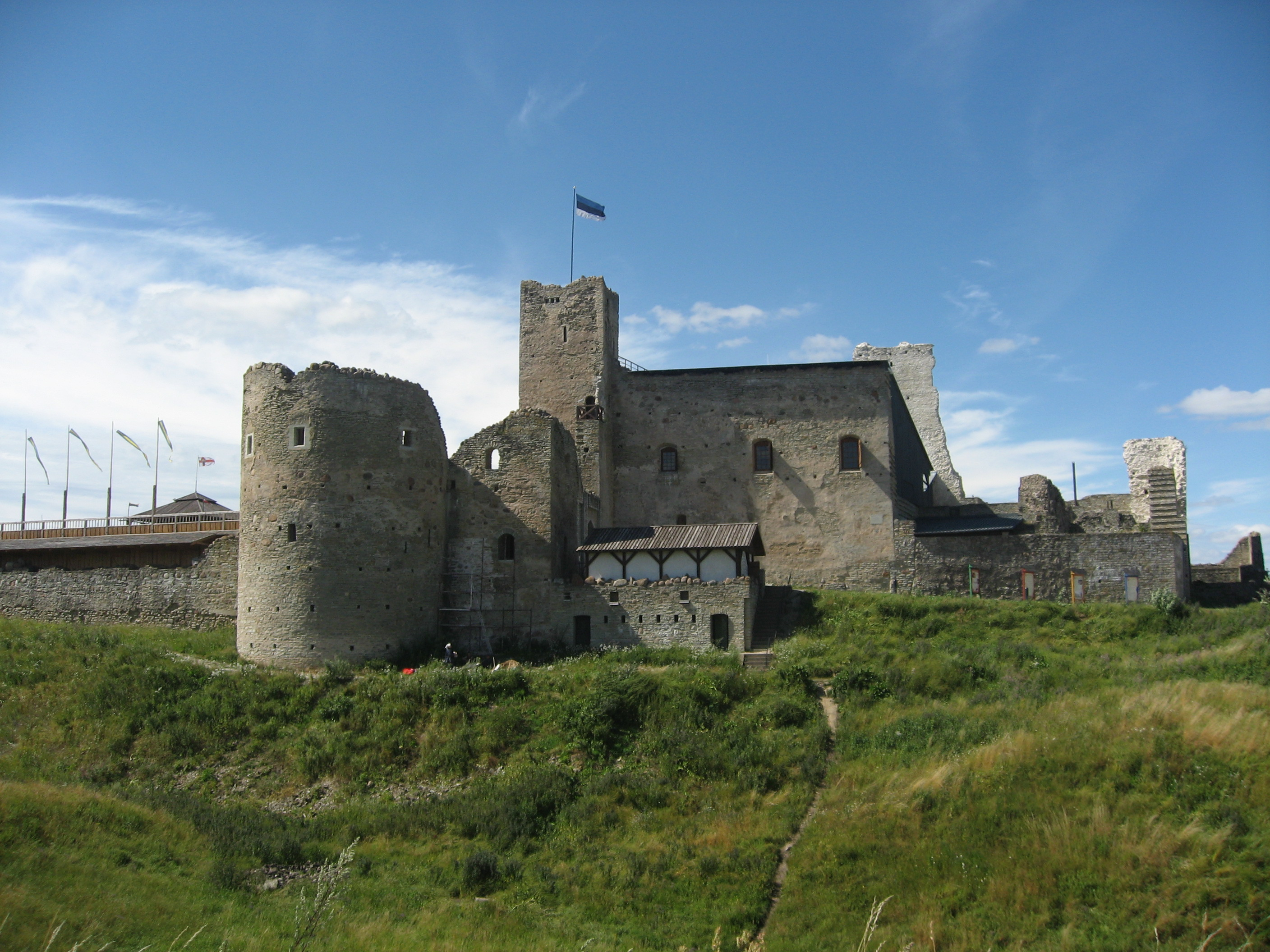
- Wesenberg (Rakvere) Castle
Date	January – March 1574
Location	Estonia 59°21′02″N 26°21′40″E
Result	Russian victory

Belligerents
Sweden	Russia

Commanders and leaders
(Sweden) Clas Åkesson Tott (Sweden) Pontus De la Gardie; Archibald Ruthven (WIA)	(Tsardom of Russia) Nikita Kropotkin

Casualties and losses
During the Siege: (Sweden) ~1,000 killed During infighting: 30 German cavalry killed 1,500 Scottish infantry killed 70 Scottish infantry deserted to Russia; 1 Scottish nobleman wounded Unknown wounded	Unknown

The siege of Wesenberg, Rakvere, or Rakovor, was an abortive Swedish siege of the Russian-held town of Wesenberg in Estonia from January through March 1574, during the Livonian War. The siege is infamous for a brawl and subsequent combat between German and Scottish mercenaries within the besieging army, which claimed the lives of about 1,500 Scots. Wesenberg was seized in a renewed Swedish assault in 1581.

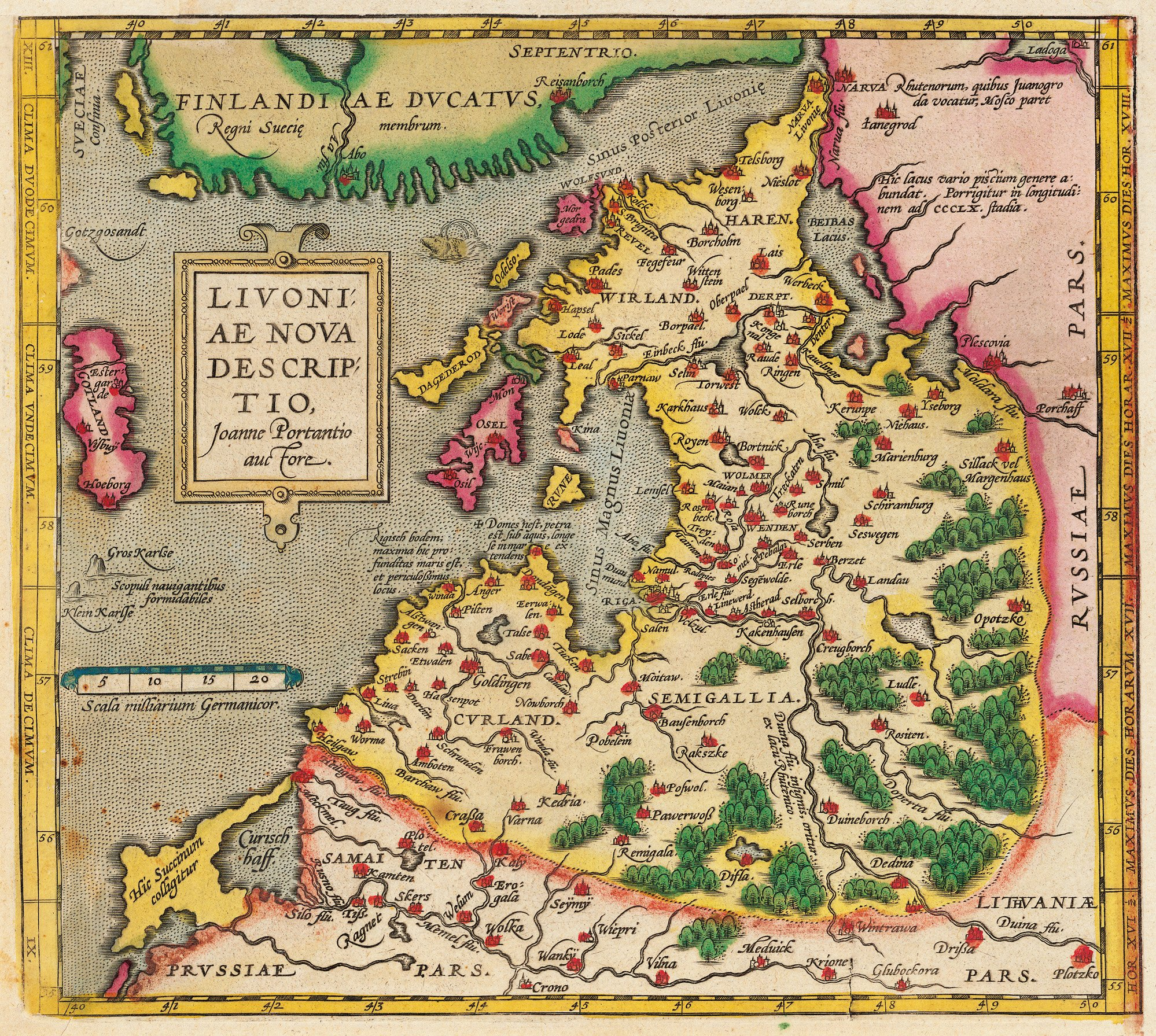
Livonia (including Estonia), contemporary map

== Background ==
While the Treaty of Stettin had formally ended the Northern Seven Years' War in the Baltic, the Livonian War dragged on for control of the Eastern Baltic coast, formerly controlled by the Teutonic Order State. The town of Wesenberg (Estonian: Rakvere; Russian: Раковоp, romanized: Rakovor) was a Russian-held stronghold situated near the southern coast of the Gulf of Finland, about half-way between Reval (Tallinn), which had submitted itself to Sweden in 1561, and Narva, captured by Ivan IV of Russia in 1558.

== Prelude ==
John III, king of Sweden since 1568, faced a Russian offensive on the Swedish positions in Estonia during the early 1570s. Reval withstood a Russian siege in 1570 and 1571, but several smaller towns were taken by Russian forces. The Russian advance was concluded by the sack of Weissenstein (Paide) in 1573. After the capture, the Russian forces roasted alive some of the leaders of Weissenstein's Swedish garrison, including its commander, triggering John III to mount a retaliatory campaign with Wesenberg being the main objective.

The campaign started in Reval, where Sweden had concentrated her troops, including between 4,000 and 5,000 Scots. Already in 1572, John III had requested that Archibald Ruthven recruit Scottish co-patriots to reinforce his Livonian army. Ruthven had raised 3,000 infantry and 760 cavalry, who arrived in Swedish Älvsborg in June and July 1573. They were split up into small units and marched to Sweden's eastern coast. Overdue pay caused some mercenaries to delay their march, pillage the countryside, and revolt against Ruthven. Upon their arrival in Stockholm and ports in Östergötland, they were joined by another 300 Scottish cavalry and shipped to Reval, where they arrived in September and joined with Swedish and Finnish regulars as well as German mercenaries, primarily consisting of cavalry and artillery. In November, the army left for Wesenberg, under the overall command of Klas Åkesson Tott (the Elder) and field command of Pontus de la Gardie. The march was again delayed by the Scottish troops, who demanded to be paid a month in advance, causing de la Gardie to sell part of his jewelry to satisfy their claims.

== Siege ==
In January 1574, (Note: Peterson (2007) erroneously gives January 1573 on page 91, contradicting his previous description of the 1573 Scottish march through Sweden on the same page.) Wesenberg was stormed twice, but without success. In the third assault of 2 March 1574, the Swedish forces lost at least 1,000 men. (Note: Ruthven claimed 1,100 Scottish dead: Fischer (1907/2009), p. 63.) Subsequent Swedish attempts to dig tunnels and set the town on fire likewise failed. De la Gardie withdrew part of the besieging army for expeditions to nearby Tolsberg (Toolse) and Dorpat (Tartu), both of which were unsuccessful.

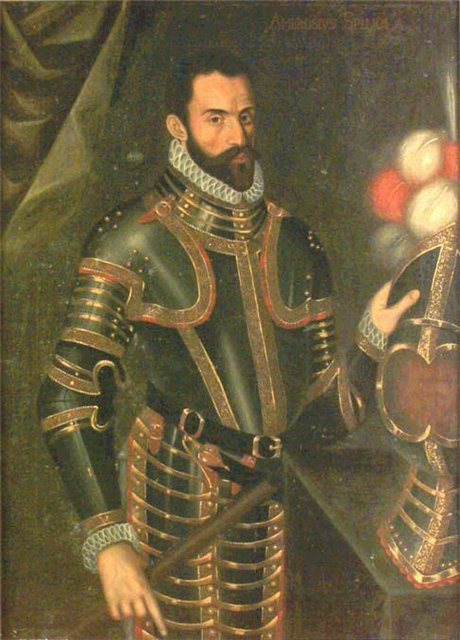
Pontus de la Gardie

Thus, the besieging forces were demoralized. In addition, supplies ran out and tensions grew after the German faction blamed the failures on a lack of Scottish support. On 17 March 1574, (Note: Fischer gives 15 March 1574: Fischer (1907/2009), p. 64.) a brawl between German and Scottish mercenaries occurred, triggered by insults and/or unpaid ale in the canteen. First, a German officer tried to intervene, but when he was unsuccessful and the brawl turned into an open fight, de la Gardie, Tott, and Ruthven arrived to the scene in person. They were however likewise attacked and fled, with Ruthven suffering severe injuries.

When the commanders had fled the scene, Scottish mercenaries overwhelmed the German artillery, seized the guns and took aim at the German cavalry. The German cavalry charged, hit by Scottish artillery fire on their way, and cut down the Scots. The result was 30 dead Germans and 1,500 dead Scots. The German and Swedish infantry stood by without taking action, neither did the Scottish cavalry intervene. (Note: Fischer however reports a possible involvement of the Scottish Moncrieff cavalry unit in the fight: Fischer (1907/2009), p. 64.) Several Scottish officers were among the dead, including David Murray, Jacob Murray, and George Michell. About 70 Scots escaped to the Russian forces in Wesenberg, the last historical record of them is that they were subsequently brought to Moscow. (Note: Fischer also cites Rüssow's report, according to whom there were 700 escapees: Fischer (1907/2009), p. 65.)

The siege was aborted and the army withdrawn to Reval by the end of March.

== Aftermath ==
As a consequence, John III of Sweden removed Tott from overall command in Livonia and replaced him with de la Gardie. Furthermore, the king would not again start an expedition relying heavily on mercenaries, and was hindered by starting any offense at all by the investigation of the Wesenberg incident and a few subsequent trials in Reval throughout 1574. Ivan IV seized the initiative until the Battle of Wenden (1578) turned the war's tide. In 1580, Sweden took Kexholmslän, and in the winter of 1580/81, Pontus de la Gardie led a Swedish army over the frozen Gulf of Finland, captured Wesenberg, turned to Narva which was taken on 6 September with the whole population slaughtered by the assailants, and until the end of 1581 sacked the last Russian strongholds in Estonia.

== Citations and references ==
=== Cited sources ===
- Black, Jeremy (1996). Warfare. Renaissance to revolution, 1492–1792. Cambridge Illustrated Atlases. Vol. 2. Cambridge University Press. ISBN 0-521-47033-1.
- Frost, Robert I (2000). The Northern Wars. War, State and Society in Northeastern Europe 1558–1721. Longman. ISBN 978-0-582-06429-4.
- Fischer, Ernst Ludwig aka Thomas A. Fisher (pseud.); Kirkpatrick, John (2009) [1907]. The Scots in Sweden; being a contribution towards the history of the Scot abroad. Reprint. BiblioBazaar, LLC.
- Peterson, Gary Dean (2007). Warrior kings of Sweden. The rise of an empire in the sixteenth and seventeenth centuries. McFarland. ISBN 978-0-7864-2873-1.
- Soderqvist, Olof E (2008) [1898]. Johan III Och Hertig Karl, 1568–1575 (in Swedish). Uppsala: BiblioBazaar, LLC. ISBN 978-0-559-18299-0.
