= Mornay Plot =

1574 plot to kill the king of Sweden

The Mornay plot was a plot in 1574 to assassinate John III of Sweden, free the imprisoned Eric XIV of Sweden and place him or Charles IX of Sweden upon the Swedish throne. The plot was hatched and planned by Charles de Mornay, a Swedish courtier of French Huguenot origin with international contacts. It was one of three major plots to free the imprisoned Eric XIV, preceded by the 1569 Plot and succeeded by the 1576 Plot.

== Plot ==
In the summer of 1572, the French envoy to Denmark, Charles de Dançay, conducted secret negotiations with unidentified Swedish aristocrats about a deposition of John III of Sweden. It appears that the future Henry III of France was suggested as a candidate for the Swedish throne. In 1573 Charles de Mornay is confirmed to have been Dançay's agent in Sweden in this issue. Charles de Mornay, a French Protestant Huguenot in service of the Swedish king, was a relative of Charles de Dançay. When Henry was elected king of Poland in June 1573, the plot of having him enthroned in Sweden was discontinued.

The plans to depose John III was, however, not discontinued. Charles de Mornay contacted Christina of Denmark, titular Queen of Denmark, Norway and Sweden, who sent him funds to overthrow John III through the Netherlands and her messenger Monsieur La Garde. This time, the plan appears to have been to depose John III in favor of Eric XIV: in any event, the plan was to free Eric from his imprisonment. According to another version, it was Duke Charles that was to be placed upon the throne. Duke Charles appears to have been informed of at least part of the plot. Charles de Mornay, who had previously been the favorite of Eric XIV, promised Duke Charles that he knew the location of Eric's alleged hidden gold reserve, which he would reveal after the coup in exchange for better conditions for Eric in prison. Among the known conspirators were Eric's French gardener Jean Allard.

John III was to be killed during a sword dance performed by Scottish mercenaries at the party which was to be given in October that year before the Scottish mercenaries departure to the Baltic. Charles de Mornay contacted Archibald Ruthwen and Gilbert Balfour, the commanders of the Scottish mercenary troops which arrived in Sweden in June 1573. In September 1573, the Scottish mercenary troops arrived in Stockholm. However, the plot did not materialize as de Mornay lost his nerve and never gave the sign to the mercenaries to take action. In October, the Scottish mercenary captain Hugh Cahun informed the king about the plot, but the accused denied all accusations, and Hugh Cahun was executed for perjury. In late October, the Scottish mercenaries left Sweden to serve in the Livonian War in Swedish Estonia.

== Exposure and trial ==
In early 1574, a conflict took place between the Scottish and German mercenaries in Swedish service in Estonia. Under interrogation, the plot was exposed. Gilbert Balfour described the negotiations of Charles de Mornay, and Pontus De la Gardie informed the king, who issued a warrant for Mornay's arrest. Four summons was issued for his questioning, but de Mornay took refuge in the Duchy of Duke Charles. In August 1574, Charles de Mornay was arrested when trying to escape Sweden by ship from Nyköping. He was arrested by order of Duke Charles.

Mornay was put on trial in Stockholm on 11 August. The trial was highly sensitive because it implicated a number of people of power, such as the king's brother Duke Charles as well as foreign people of power. Duke Charles was not summoned but left a written testimony implicating Mornay without implicating himself. Another important witness was Duke Charle's English servant Sigfrid Preston, and the testimonies of the Scottish mercenaries, notably that of Gilbert Balfour. Charles de Mornay admitted his guilt.

It was never made clear who participated in the plot. However, it is noted, that the suspected conspirators Hogenskild Bielke, Gustaf Banér and Pontus De la Gardie, often gathered at meetings in the apartment of Princess Elizabeth of Sweden, meetings where Princess Cecilia of Sweden had also frequently been seen, and the two sisters and their brother Charles were somewhat compromised though they were never accused.

Charles de Mornay also revealed, that one of the things which were agreed upon by the conspirators was to raise the dowry of Elizabeth from 100,000 to 150,000, so to make it possible for her to make a marriage of higher status. It is noted, that the marriage between Elizabeth and Henry III of France, which was officially suggested in 1574, could have been informally suggested through Charles already the year before, and that the French ambassador had expressed himself impressed by everything regarding Elizabeth with the exception of her dowry. It seems that John III suspected Cecilia to have prepared a rebellion against him: in 1573, he gave an order that Cecilia was not to be allowed in the Stockholm Castle during his absence, and in 1574, after the plot had been exposed, he gave orders to the governors in Östergötland to keep Cecilia under watch and not to let her have access to any royal castle.

On 29 August, Charles de Mornay was sentenced guilty as charged for treason against King John III as well as having caused the execution of the innocent Hugh Cahun. Duke Charles was, if not an active participant so at least aware of the plot without trying to prevent it – but his part in the affair was silenced by order of the king. Duke Charles applied for mercy for Charles de Mornay on behalf of the noblemen Erik and Johan Sparre, nephews of Mornay's Swedish wife Anna Trolle, but without success. Mornay was executed in Stockholm on the 4 September 1574. Archibald Ruthwen and Gilbert Balfour were also executed.

== See also ==
- 1569 Plot
