= Treaty of Berwick (1560) =

Treaty between Scottish nobles and England

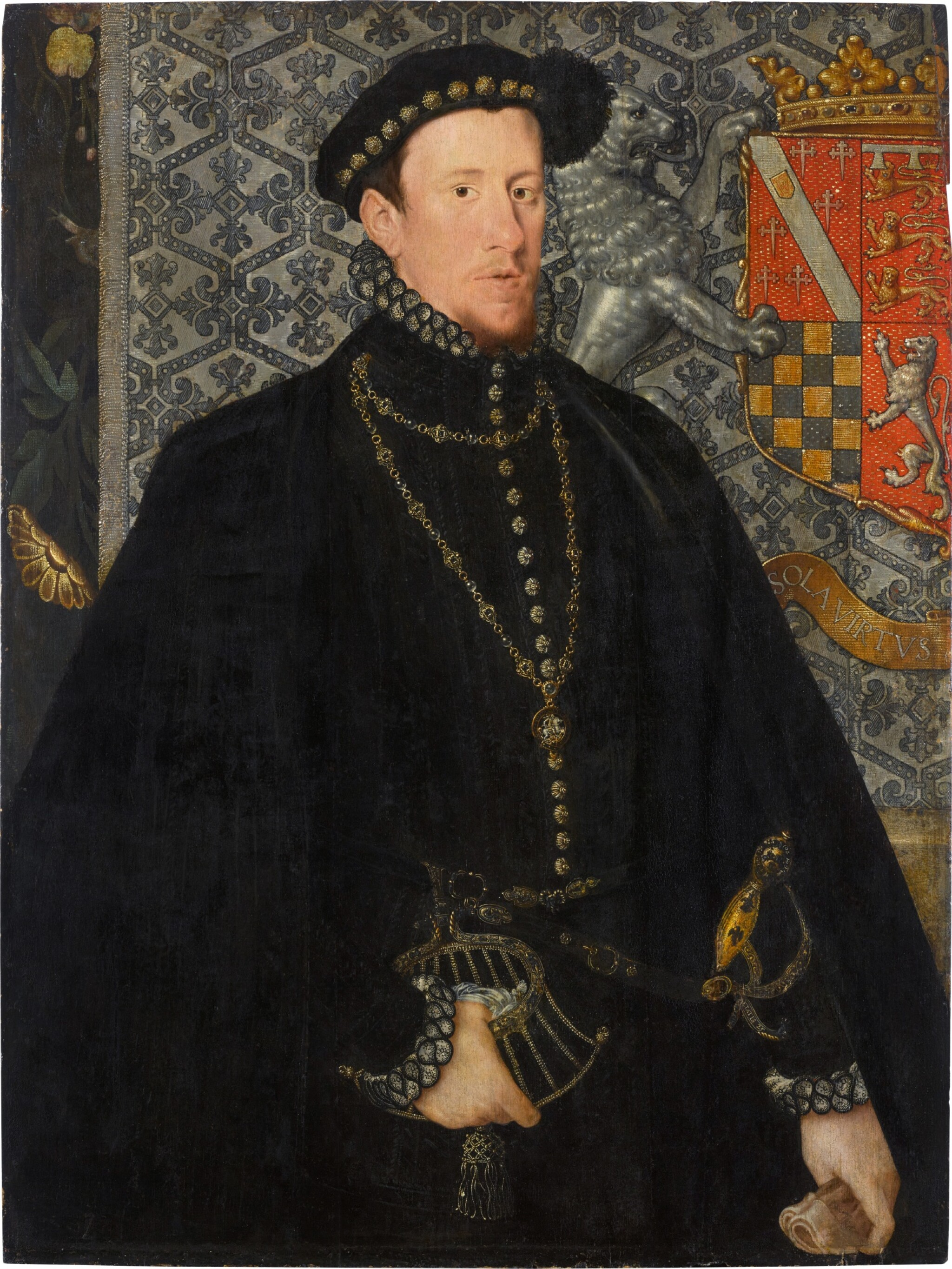
Thomas Howard, Duke of Norfolk, England's representative at Berwick

The Treaty of Berwick was negotiated on 27 February 1560 at Berwick-upon-Tweed. It was an agreement made by the representative of Queen Elizabeth I of England, the Duke of Norfolk, and a group of Scottish nobles, the Lords of the Congregation. The treaty set the terms under which an English fleet and army would come to Scotland to expel the French troops who were defending the Regency of Mary of Guise. The Lords were trying both to expel the French and to effect the Scottish Reformation, and this led to rioting and armed conflict.

== England and the Scottish Lords of the Congregation ==
The leader of the Lords of the Congregation was the Duke of Chatelherault. He had formerly been Regent, but in this treaty was described as "second person", meaning that he was heir to the throne after the 17-year-old Mary, Queen of Scots. His representatives at Berwick were James Stewart, 1st Earl of Moray, Patrick, Lord Ruthven, Sir John Maxwell of Terregles, William Maitland younger of Lethington, John Wishart of Pitarrow, and Master Henry Balnaves of Halhill. England's representative was Thomas, Duke of Norfolk. The English ambassador in France, Nicholas Throckmorton, encouraged Elizabeth to support the Scottish lords, arguing the benefits for her in Ireland and a stable alliance in future with Scotland severed from its auld alliance with France.

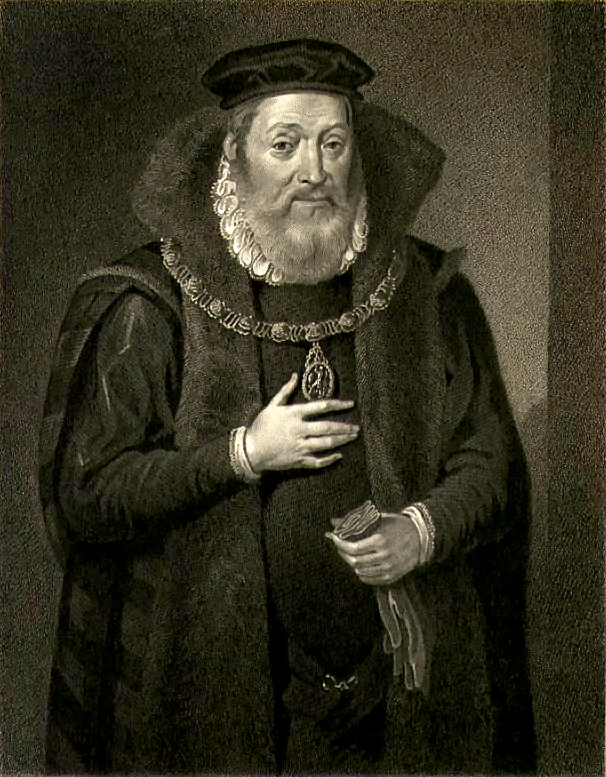
Duke of Châtellerault, Scotland's representative at Berwick

The treaty was effective: the English navy already had a fleet in the Firth of Forth commanded by William Winter, and now an English army under Baron Grey de Wilton marched north from Berwick into Scotland, camping first at Halidon Hill on 27 March. The Scottish Lords arranged to rendezvous with the English army on 31 March 1560, at Aitchison's Haven, the harbour of Newbattle Abbey at Prestongrange in East Lothian.

On 24 March 1560 Elizabeth had a proclamation published and circulated in English, French, and Italian, which detailed her concerns over Mary's use of English heraldry and the ambitions of the Guise family. The proclamation stressed that England was not at war with France or Scotland, although Elizabeth had been forced to "put in order, to her great charges, certain forces both by sea and land."

The English force assisted with the Siege of Leith until hostilities ended in July 1560, after the death of Mary of Guise and the signing of the Treaty of Edinburgh. Under the terms of the treaty, the French fortifications at Leith, new works at Dunbar Castle and at Eyemouth were demolished and the French and English went home. The religious ambitions of the Scottish lords were realised in the Reformation Parliament of August 1560. This parliament also ratified the treaty; William Maitland commended it and the goodwill and favour of Elizabeth in relieving the extreme necessity and "almost utter ruen of the whole countrie." According to the English observer Thomas Randolph, there was common consent and some would have happily signed in their own blood.

== Context and the historians ==
John Knox thought the treaty so important in explaining the actions of the Lords of the Congregation to posterity that he inserted the whole text into his History of the Reformation. Knox directly related the treaty to the thinking of his colleague Christopher Goodman in his tract, How Superior Powers Ought to be Obeyed, by writing:

And because we have heard the malicious tongues of wicked men make false report of this our fact, we have faithfully and truly inserted in this our history the said contract, ... that memory thereof may bide to our posterity; to the end that they may judge with indifference, whether that we have done anything prejudicial to our commonwealth or yet contrarious unto that debtful obedience which true subjects owe to their superiors".

The historian Michael Lynch called the treaty "an astonishing document which mentioned many things but not religion." Pamela Ritchie, historian and author of a biography of Mary of Guise, sees the treaty as facilitating "the interference of a foreign monarch in what was essentially a domestic crisis." William Ferguson argued that previous historians had overemphasised the significance of the treaty and the English military action. While the intervention was opportunistic, arranged following the tumult of Amboise when France was first troubled by her wars of Religion, the English army did not receive widespread welcome and support and failed to take Leith by storm. The English were aware of the probable impact of troubles in France; Cecil wrote to Ralph Sadler on 22 March 1560 that:

we here doo trust well that the bravery of the French wilbe cooled; at home, they have ynough to doo with trooble partly for religion, partly for governance; God send his just wrath amomgst them to their amendment.

The Scottish Lords had already seen the opportunity arising from pressures on France's borders. On 20 January Richard Maitland wrote to his friend in London of their readiness to abandon the Auld Alliance, noting;

It shall not be amiss to consider in what case the French be presently, their estate is not always so calm at home as everyman thinketh ... the demand by the Empire for the restitution of Metz, Toul, and Verdun may grow to some business.

== Articles of the treaty ==
On 27 March 1560, Mary of Guise wrote to her brothers, the Cardinal and Duke of Guise, that she never saw anything so shameful as the Articles.

The articles signed at Berwick included:

1. The belief of Elizabeth that France intended to conquer Scotland, and offered her protection to its nobility during the marriage of Mary to Francis II of France.
2. Elizabeth would send an army with all speed to join with Scots.
3. Any forts won by the English force would be immediately destroyed by the Scots, or delivered to the Duke of Châtellerault.
4. The Scots will aid the English Army.
5. All enemies of England are enemies of both.
6. Scotland shall be no further united to France than by Mary's marriage.
7. Scotland will help repel French invasions of England.
8. The Earl of Argyll will help English rule in the north of Ireland.
9. The Scots will offer hostages or 'pledges' – those sent in April 1560 included:
  1. Claud Hamilton, 1st Lord Paisley, Châtellerault's son, aged 14.
  2. Master Alexander Campbell, first cousin to the Earl of Argyll.
  3. Master Robert Douglas half-brother of Lord James.
  4. Master James Cunningham, son of Earl of Glencairn.
  5. Master George Graham, son of the Earl of Menteith, aged 5.
  6. Master Archibald Ruthven, son of Lord Ruthven, aged 14.
    These hostages were at Newcastle by 10 April 1560, attended by Ninian Menville of Sledwick Hall. Châtellerault wrote to Elizabeth on 21 December 1561, asking for the return of these pledges, as they were meant to stay in England only until a year after the end of Mary's French marriage.
10. The treaty to be signed by the Duke after the hostages are delivered. There is no due obedience withdrawn from Mary or the French king.

The treaty was signed and sealed by 30 of the Lords of the Congregation at the 'camp before Leith' (Pilrig) on 10 May 1560.
