= 1576 Plot =

The 1576 Plot was a conspiracy in Sweden in 1576. The purpose was to depose John III of Sweden and reinstate the imprisoned Eric XIV of Sweden on the Swedish throne. It was the last of three major plots to free the imprisoned Eric XIV, and was preceded by the 1569 Plot and the 1574 Mornay Plot.

== Background ==
The rebellion was instigated by Mauritz Rasmusson (Mauricius Erasmi) (d. 1577), a Protestant clergyman and vicar of Timmele. He was opposed to the Pro-Catholic tendencies toward a Counter-Reformation under John III and his Catholic queen Catherine Jagiellon, which was highlighted by the introduction of the nova ordinantia-reform of 1575 and the Red Book-reform of 1576 during the Liturgical struggle.

== Plan ==
Mauritz Rasmusson conspired with the nobleman Erik Gyllenstierna and through his connections acquired allies among the clergy, peasants and merchants in Västergötland. The rebellion was to take place in Västergötland and in Småland. Their purpose was to deposed John III, free Eric XIV and reinstate him or - if this proved impossible, Duke Charles or, as a third alternative, elect Erik Gyllenstierna to the throne.

== Trial ==
In November 1576, John III was informed about the conspiracy when Lasse Rasmusson, brother of Mauritz Rasmusson and secretary of Erik Gyllenstierna's cousin Nils Gyllenstierna, was overheard. On 12 November, an investigation was issued. Witnesses claimed that Mauritz Rasmusson had planned to free Erik XIV, have John III killed, but also have Erik Gyllenstierna and "all the nobility of the realm" killed. On 29 November, the trial was conducted in Vadstena. Mauritz Rasmusson denied the accusations, but several witnesses testified against him, including his own wife Anna Lassadotter and his brothers, which was given much credibility.

19 December 1576, Mauritz Rasmusson was condemned to death guilty of treason. During torture, he pointed out the nobleman Erik Gyllenstierna as his accomplice, but retracted it again. In January 1577, the imprisoned Erik XIV was moved from his prison to another deemed more safe, and in February, he died in prison.

In March 1577, Mauritz Rasmusson was confronted in prison by those accused of being his accomplices. Erik Gyllenstierna was freed from all charges because no evidence could be found against him. As Mauritz Rasmusson himself retracted his confessions against everyone he pointed out as his accomplices, no one could be sentenced with him. He was sent to his home parish of Timmele and executed there in April 1577. The public reportedly viewed him as innocent, and folk legend claimed that everyone who testified against him was therefore cursed.

== Aftermath ==
The plot made John III fear a new Dacke Feud, and caused a mistrust and conflict with the clergy in February 1577, when he sharply criticized the clergy during a meeting with them. In parallel to this, admiral Bengt Bagge was executed for un-connected suspected treason in Stockholm in 1577, contributing to the political tension. It is estimated, that these events influenced the restrictions of John III against the imprisoned Eric XIV, the orders that Eric was to be killed if anyone attempted to free him, and the death of Eric in February 1577.

== See also ==
- 1569 Plot
- Mornay Plot
