= Jehan Alard =

Jean Allard or Jehan Alard (fl. 1580), was a French adventurer.

He was a French Huguenot. He was employed as a gardener by Erik XIV of Sweden in 1563, with the responsibility of the king's orangery and fruit garden, which was to become the later Kungsträdgården in Stockholm. In 1568, Erik was deposed, but he remained at court. In 1574, he was implicated as a participator of the Mornay Plot against John III of Sweden. He was protected by Duke Charles and left Sweden for Italy with a passport issued by the duke the same year in the company of Oliver d'Archi, tasked to act as the spies of the duke in Italy. He appears to have betrayed Charles.

In 1576, he is noted to have been a galley slave in Italy. He was condemned to the galleys by the Inquisition after having been associated with the heretic Martinengo counts in Brescia. He was a prisoner in the prison of the Inquisition in 1577–78. When released, it was reported that he attempted to recruit mercenaries in France to attack Sweden, and in 1579, the governor of the Älvsborg Fortress was warned against him. In 1580, it was noted that he had not yet been tried for his crimes in Sweden, possible referring to his participation in the Mornay plot. This is the last time he is mentioned.
