= 1569 Plot =

The 1569 Plot was a conspiracy in Sweden in 1569. The purpose was to depose John III of Sweden and reinstate the imprisoned Eric XIV of Sweden on the Swedish throne. The plot was instigated by the courtiers of Eric's spouse queen Karin Månsdotter; her lady-in-waiting Elin Andersdotter and her personal secretary Thomas Jakobsson. It was the first of three major plots to free the imprisoned Eric XIV (followed by the Mornay Plot and the 1576 Plot), but has been described as the most serious one. The plot was exposed and prevented before it could be put in action and resulted in the execution of the conspirators.

== Plot ==
In the summer of 1569, a plot was discovered with the intent to free and reinstate Erik XIV. The plan was the ship owner Per Larsson would fire at the city of Stockholm, and that the former monarch should be able to flee from his prison in the royal palace during the confusion, and the gather followers in Dalarna, by which he could be reinstated upon the throne.

The conspirators consisted of members of the staff of the former royal couple Erik XIV and Karin Månsdotter: the secretary and mistress of the robes of Karin, Thomas Jakobsson and Elin Andersdotter; the ship owners Per Larsson and Frans Klementsson; the chaplain Jon, Per Pålsson and the spouse of Elin Andersdotter; Hans Andersson. Elin Andersdotter was, alongside Thomas Jakobsson, the leader of the conspiracy, and financed the whole affair. The conspirators held their conferences at the home of Jakobsson, who also handled the correspondence with Erik XIV, who was informed about the plot. It is unknown whether Karin Månsdotter was informed of the plot or participated in it.

During the trials against the conspirators, Andersdotter and Jakobsson were interrogated about the alleged hidden treasure that John III was certain had been hidden away by Erik XIV, and were promised a pardon if they helped recover it. But they revealed nothing, if indeed there had been such a treasure at all.

Elin Andersdotter and Thomas Jakobsson was found guilty of treason and executed as the main instigators of the plot.

== See also ==
- 1576 Plot
- Mornay Plot
