= Paul Sartorius (composer) =

Paul Sartorius (16 November 1569 – 28 February 1609) was a German composer and organist.

He was born Paul Schneider in Nuremberg, and at some point adopted a Latinized version of his name (which in German means "tailor"). In his youth he traveled to Italy to study. In 1594 he obtained the professional position he held for the rest of his life, namely as organist for the court music of Archduke Maximilian III of Austria. His music shows strong Italian influence. He died in Innsbruck.
