= Elin Andersdotter =

Swedish lady-in-waiting (died 1569)

Elin Andersdotter (died 1569), was a Swedish courtier. She served as Chief Court Mistress to queen Karin Månsdotter of Sweden. She is known for being a leading actor in the 1569 Plot to free and reinstate the imprisoned and deposed king Erik XIV of Sweden.

== Life ==
Elin Andersdotter was reportedly the widow of a certain Gerdt Svärdfejare from Vadstena, and remarried at an unknown time to a man by the name Hans Andersson. She is first mentioned as a part of the staff of the royal mistress Karin Månsdotter in 1566. Described as a loyal servant, she received several gifts from Karin.

When Karin Månsdotter became queen, Elin Andersdotter was named mistress of the Robes. This was an unusual position for a commoner, but the court appointed to Karin Månsdotter, herself originally a commoner, when she became queen, was quite small, smaller than those of her royal sisters-in-law, and mainly consisting of her former staff of commoners. Initially, the noblewoman Marina Grip had been appointed to the position, but she had stayed only temporary.

In 1568, Erik XIV was deposed and imprisoned alongside Karin Månsdotter, who was however allowed to keep her staff.

=== The 1569 Plot ===
In the summer of 1569, a plot was discovered with the intent to free and reinstate Erik XIV. The plan was the ship owner Per Larsson would fire at the city of Stockholm, and that the former monarch should be able to flee from his prison in the royal palace during the confusion, and the gather followers in Dalarna, by which he could be reinstated upon the throne.

The conspirators consisted of members of the staff of the former royal couple Erik XIV and Karin Månsdotter: the secretary and mistress of the robes of Karin, Thomas Jakobsson and Elin Andersdotter; the ship owners Per Larsson and Frans Klementsson; the chaplain Jon, Per Pålsson and the spouse of Elin Andersdotter; Hans Andersson. Elin Andersdotter was, alongside Thomas Jakobsson, the leader of the conspiracy, and financed the whole affair. The conspirators held their conferences at the home of Jakobsson, who also handled the correspondence with Erik XIV, who was informed about the plot. It is unknown whether Karin Månsdotter was informed of the plot or participated in it.

During the trials against the conspirators, Andersdotter was interrogated about the alleged hidden treasure that John III was certain had been hidden away by Erik XIV, and were promised a pardon if she helped recover it. But she revealed nothing, if indeed there had been such a treasure at all.

=== Death ===
Elin Andersdotter was found guilty of conspiring to overthrow the monarch. Alongside Thomas Jakobsson, she was executed as the main instigator of the plot.

Court offices
Preceded by Anna Hogenskild	Mistress of the Robes to the Queen of Sweden; 1567–1568	Succeeded by Karin Gyllenstierna
