= Caunes-Minervois =

Commune in Occitanie, France

- Commune
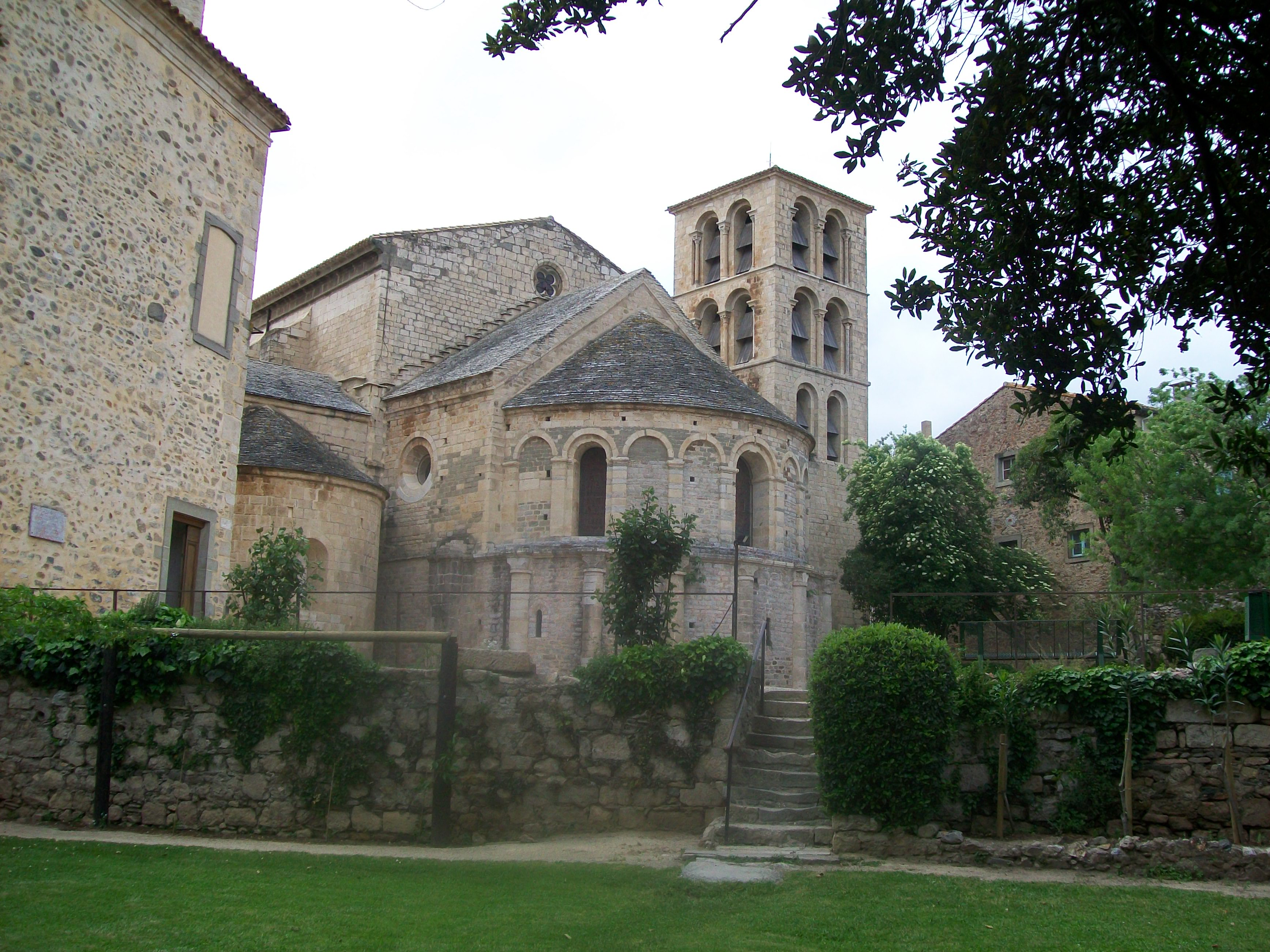
- Abbey

- Coat of arms
- Location of Caunes-Minervois
- Location within France Location within Occitanie
- Coordinates: 43°19′39″N 2°31′44″E
- Country: France
- Region: Occitania
- Department: Aude
- Arrondissement: Carcassonne
- Canton: Le Haut-Minervois
- Intercommunality: Carcassonne Agglo

Government
  - Mayor (2023–2026): Ludovic Barlaud
- Area^{1}: 27.84 km^{2} (10.75 sq mi)
- Elevation: 176 m (577 ft)
- Highest elevation: 861 m (2,825 ft)
- Lowest elevation: 144 m (472 ft)
- Population (2023): 1,554
  - Density: 55.82/km^{2} (144.6/sq mi)
- Time zone: UTC+01:00 (CET)
  - Summer (DST): UTC+02:00 (CEST)
- INSEE/Postal code: 11081 /11160
- ^{1} French Land Register data, which excludes lakes, ponds, glaciers > 1 km^{2} (0.386 sq mi or 247 acres) and river estuaries.

Caunes-Minervois is a small medieval town and commune in the Aude department in the Occitanie region in southern France. It is known particularly for its ancient Abbey, dating from the eighth century, and the outstanding red marble that has been quarried locally from Roman times. The name may derive from the ancient local Occitan word for cave, "cauna", of which there are a number in the immediate area.

Caunes is also in the Minervois, a designated wine growing region with AOC status but with an ancient heritage. The name derives from the ancient regional capital of Minerve, some 20 km east of Caunes, itself named for the Roman Goddess Minerva. The Romans came through here, settling and introducing vines & olives in the region. Minervois Vignerons have been dynamic in changing the perception of the world towards wine from the south of France, developing quality products and experimenting with both old and new grape varieties and techniques.

The ruined castle (chateau) at Minerve is a site attracting many visitors due to the ongoing interest in Catharism and the Albigensian Crusade. Caunes lies in the northern part of the modern touristic region of the "Pays Cathare" – Cathar Country – which stretches here from the Pyrenees.

== Geography and geology ==
The town sits at the foot of the Montagne Noire which are themselves the southernmost extent of the Massif Central. The change in slope designates a change in geology from the predominantly metamorphic rocks of the nearby mountains to the alluvial deposits of the plains.

The settlement lies adjacent to the mountain river L’argent Double which can be a torrent after rain but usually has a gentle and semi-continuous flow, sometime disappearing completely below a bouldery riverbed. Highest flows are usually recorded in February falling away throughout the dry months. This river is a key attribute that lead to early settlement here, both in terms of the important pass created by its valley and the regular, sweet water supply. The river name l’Argent Double is purported to come from the Latin Argent meaning silver and Celtic dubrum, meaning water. Whether this refers to just the colour of a tumbling stream, the fact that the water is sweet (soft), or some other mineral content is not clear.

Figure 1. Map of the Montagne Noire. In the inset France is tan, the Massif Central is orange, and the Montagne Noire is purple (Roger, 2004).

The geology of the area has attracted considerable study and is fundamental to the position of the town:

1. the weakness in the rocks giving rise to the course of the river
2. the mountain pass following the river
3. the formation of the local marble through metamorphosis and
4. the subsequent development of complex local soil types allowing for a variety of vineyard terroirs

On a larger scale, the Montagne Noir result from the tectonic movements of ancient plates, ultimately resulting in the upthrust of the Alps and the Pyrenees. These mountain building events are known as orogenic periods, often named after the principal mountain ranges or ancient tribal areas in which the early geological research was undertaken. The Montagne Noire result largely from what is known as the Variscan (or Hercynian) Orogeny.

The local geology is complex with evidence of very old rocks from the Precambrian period being distorted and overlain with ocean sediments, which in turn have been involved in massive tectonic events. The changes to sedimentary deposits due to intense pressure and temperature effects have given rise to metamorphic rocks such as schist, gneiss & the economically important marble.

Granite outcrops can also be found relatively close (10 km) to Caunes adding complexity to the geology. It is expected that groundwater percolating though the acidic granite provides much of the soft water to the l’Argent Double in an area where hard water is more usual.

South, away from the metamorphic rocks of the mountains yet in close proximity, lie almost unaffected limestones, sandstones, clays and other rock forms. These are mixed with more recent alluvial deposits from the Aude valley.

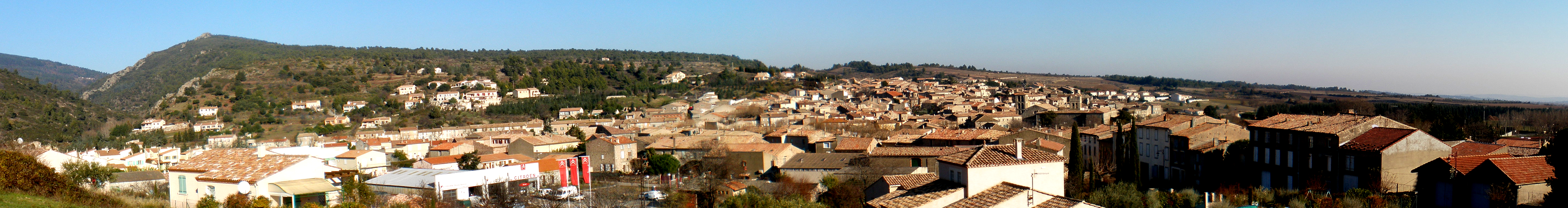

== Flora ==
Much of the flora south of Caunes is dominated by vineyards. However, there are also numerous limestone ridges that cannot be economically cultivated. These areas are often wooded with pines, kermes (or holly) oak and have an understory of typical "garrigue" plants: lavender, sage, rosemary, thyme, cistus, and Artemisia etc.

The mountains immediately to the north of Caunes hold a wider variety of "maquis" flora, often in addition to the garrigue species: large semi-natural woodland areas comprising holm and pubescent oak, umbrella pine, juniper (Juniperus communis, Juniperus phoenicea and Juniperus oxycedrus – locally called ‘cade’ are each abundant), olive and almond. The limestone encourages numerous other small plants such as various orchids, fritillaries and iris.

Marked walking trails with some informative interpretation boards originate in Caunes. These lead up onto the lower Montagne noire and pass through the typical varied scenery.

There is also a short botanical trail close by (6 km) on the ridge between Caunes and Felines Minervois.

== History, proto-history, and pre-history ==
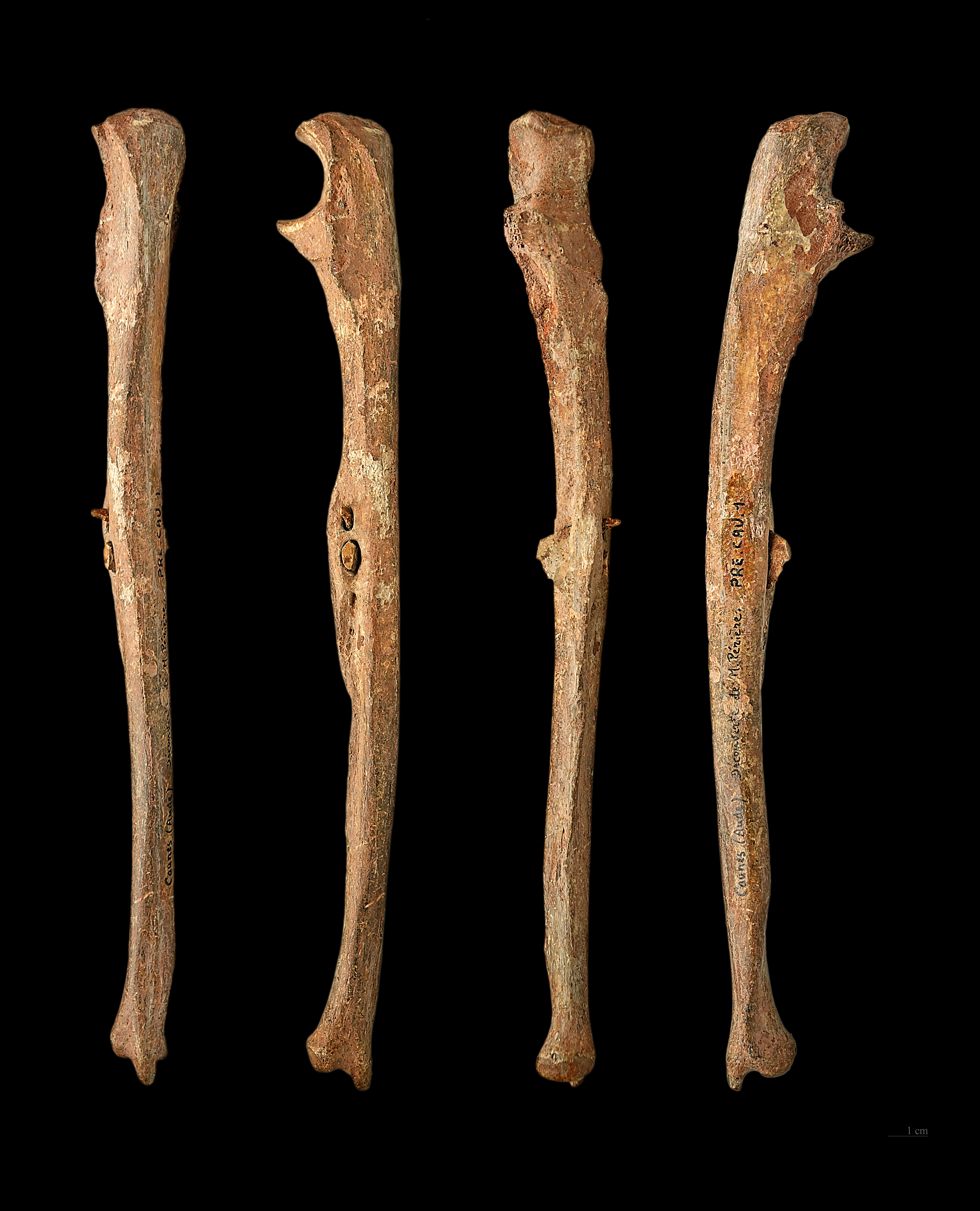
Human ulna pierced with a flint arrowhead

The whole of the southern France is rich in early signs of man. Early hunter-gatherer inhabitants would have made use of the many caves in limestones of the southern Montagne Noire. Their passage is now marked by hundreds of dolmens and menhirs throughout the area. Many of these have been or are in jeopardy of becoming lost to agriculture or neglect.

One of the closest is the large and well-preserved covered alley at Saint-Eugène, some 4 km south of Caunes. This and other ceremonial sites have funerary goods which show activity of trade across Europe.

In 1827 Paul Tournal, a local amateur archaeologist, found early human bones and other remains (about 6000 years old) in a cave near Bize Minervois, 20 km east of Caunes. Tournal went on to found the Commission Archéologique et Littéraire de Narbonne and was Secretary until he died.

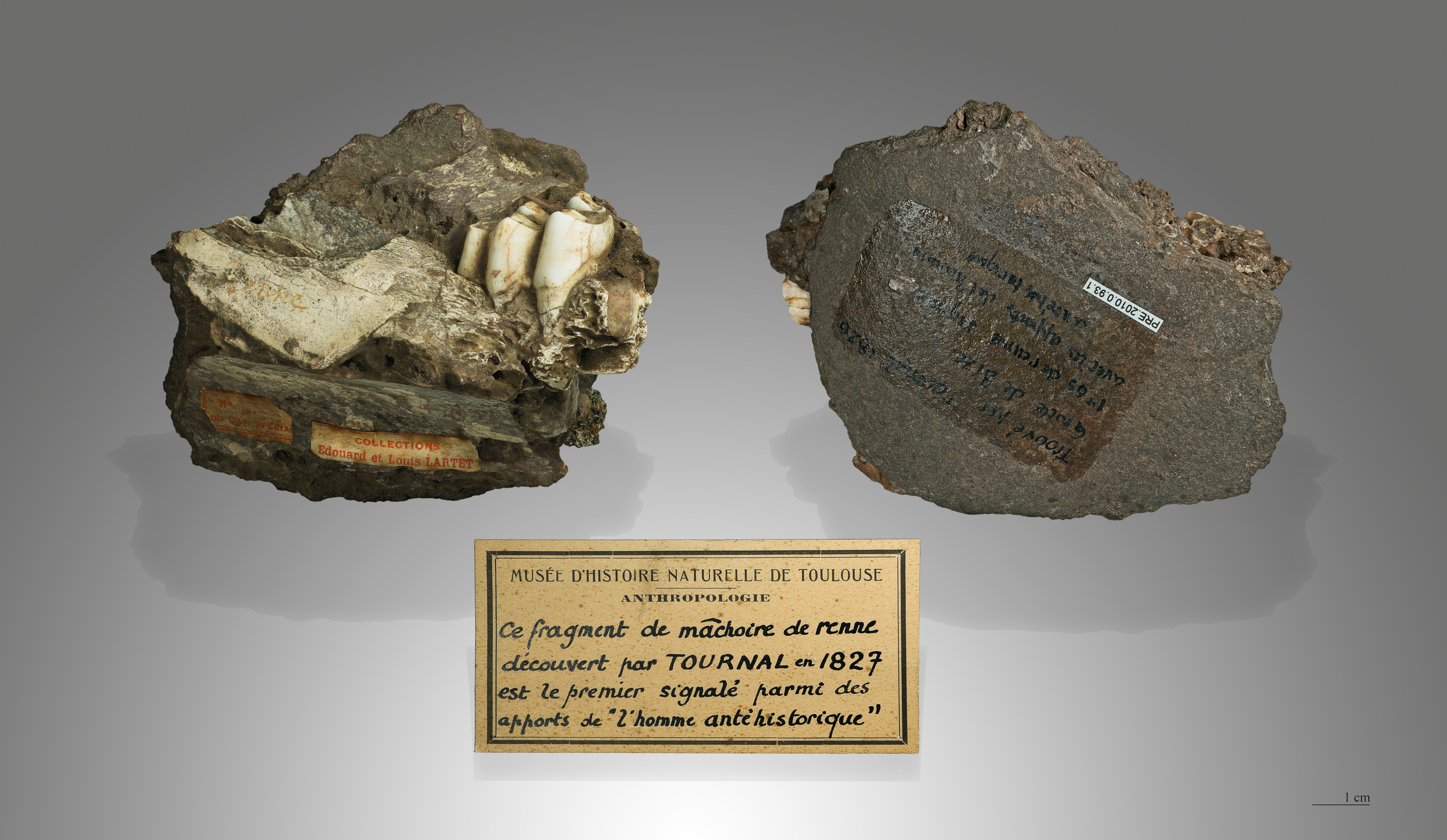
Reindeer jaws found by Paul Tournal

There are signs of early semi-permanent settlements in the area, evidenced by archaeological finds throughout the Aude. The Aude river formed the basis of a major trade route (Aude-Garonne corridor) and a combination of the warm climate and water availability from the Montagne Noire allowed for settlement if not farming.

A number of oppida, large permanent settlements often associated with defensive positions such as hilltops or river bends, are located in the area. The term oppidum probably comes from the Roman word for enclosed space, and these sites are typified by early planned architectural features. Very close to Caunes is the Oppidum du Cros with signs of occupation up to around 600 BC.

Certainly the Greeks and Romans knew the region and traded through it towards Spain and there is evidence of the Romans in the vicinity of Caunes today. There is a Roman bridge over the l’Argent Double 300m north of Caunes, adjacent to the modern D620.

== Abbey of St Peter and St Paul ==
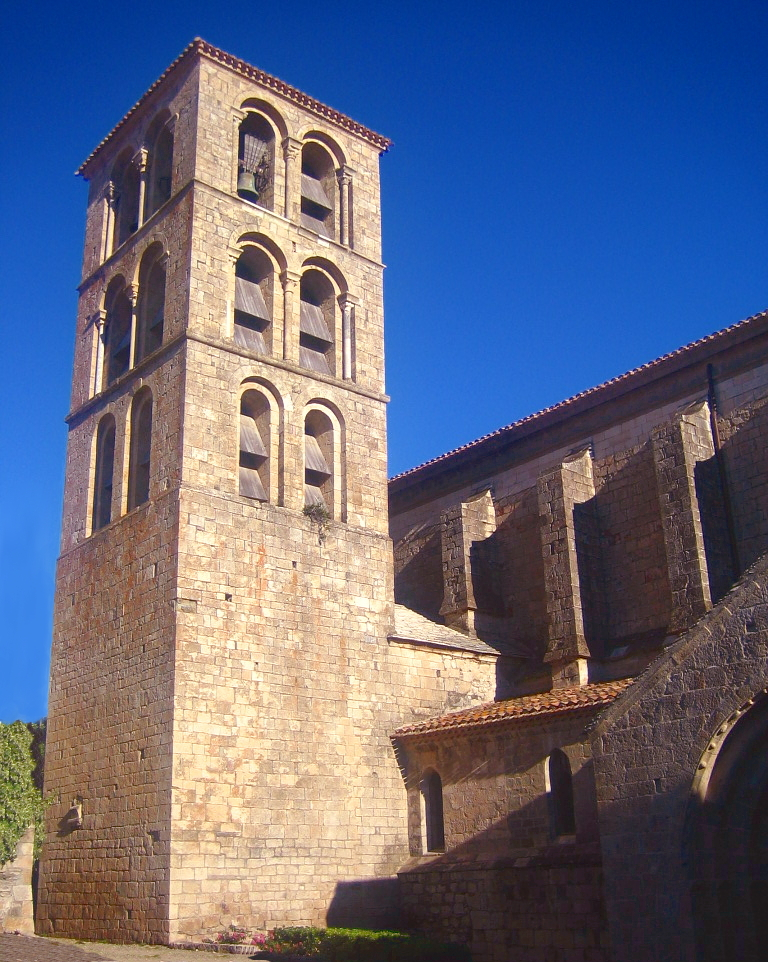
North bell tower of the abbey

The Church played a vital role in the security and stability of the early Languedoc and was key to the subsequent development and wealth of medieval Caunes. The Abbey at Caunes consists of the great church itself, cloisters and surrounding monastery buildings as well the old Abbot's residence. The complex has been referred to as a unique architectural ensemble. Throughout Caunes there are remains of the substantial walls of the Abbey enclosure as well as traces of grand buildings, now often lost in the walls of simpler houses.

=== Foundation and growth ===
The Abbey of St. Peter & St. Paul was founded by a monk known as Anian or Anianus, a companion of Benedict of Anian in 790. Charlemagne confirmed the right to the land in 794 and the church was consecrated between 806 and 820. Benedict of Anian, the son of Languedocian nobleman, went on to formulate the strict code of the Benedictine order which was adopted in 817 under an edict from Charlemagne. In fact, the Abbey founders soon adopted the order of the Benedictines themselves.

Effectively, so placed under the direct protection of the king, Charlemagne, the Abbey enjoyed many privileges. Charlemagne's heir, Charles the Bald gave substantial gifts of royal (fiscal) land to Caunes in 844. Even so, there are records of Caunes being forced to institute lawsuits in 855 and 875 before it was able to regain land taken from it by local landowners. As the authority of subsequent Carolingians became rather less respected in parts of the Midi and Catalonia, and it was necessary for Charles the Bald to renew the charter in 875. Similar charters were endorsed in nearby Lagrasse and Saint-Chaffre in 876. This stability and many donations from devotees allowed the abbots to procure land & properties.

In 982, first mention is made of relics of four early Christian martyrs secured for the Abbey: those of Armand (Amand), Luce (Lucius), Audalde, and Alexandre (Alexander). These are still venerated and processed through the town, the feast day being June 6. The relics became objects of pilgrimage and brought further wealth from devotees, allowing the Carolingian Abbey to be rebuilt under Abbot William (1021–1059).

=== Albigensian Crusade ===
The Abbey subsequently passed to the Counts of Barcelona and later through their bloodline to the Trencavel family. This family largely lost their lands and rights after their support of the Cathars in the Albigensian Crusade. During the crusade the Abbey received several representatives of the Pope, which came to preach the Catholic rites, underlining the importance of Caunes in the region. Because of its support of the Catholic Church during the crusade, the Abbey was also able to buy feudal lands from those who had been excommunicated as Cathar sympathisers.

Following many revolts and military reversals, the crusade was rejoined under Louis VIII in 1225 and Caunes was once more in the frame as a stronghold of the Catholic faith. Of particular note was the burning at the stake of the elderly Cathar Bishop or Perfect of Carcassonne, Pierre Isarn in 1226, witnessed by the King. This may have been the last significant scene of the crusade as it is said that the sickening example made of Isarn at Caunes was Louis VIII's last exploit in Southern France and he returned to Paris, dying en route in the Auvergne in November 1226.

=== Later years ===
The 13th and 14th centuries continued to be marked by conflict for power between secular and religious authorities. However, the Abbey prevailed, continuing to increase its prosperity: it doubled the number of its members from fifteen to thirty as well as maintaining a substantial staff.

Some grand buildings were constructed in the surrounding town during this period, most notably the existent Sicard Mansion. In 1337 the Abbot granted the town the right to elect public servant through a council. There is clearly significant interaction between the wider church, Abbot and the town, with the right being given to trade in salt, allowing the development of substantial wealth in the town. There still exists a street named for the salt trade: Rue Du Plo de la Sal, meaning Salt Hill in the local Occitan dialect. This street is on one of the way-marked tours of the town and shows dated lintels and remnants of fine architecture.

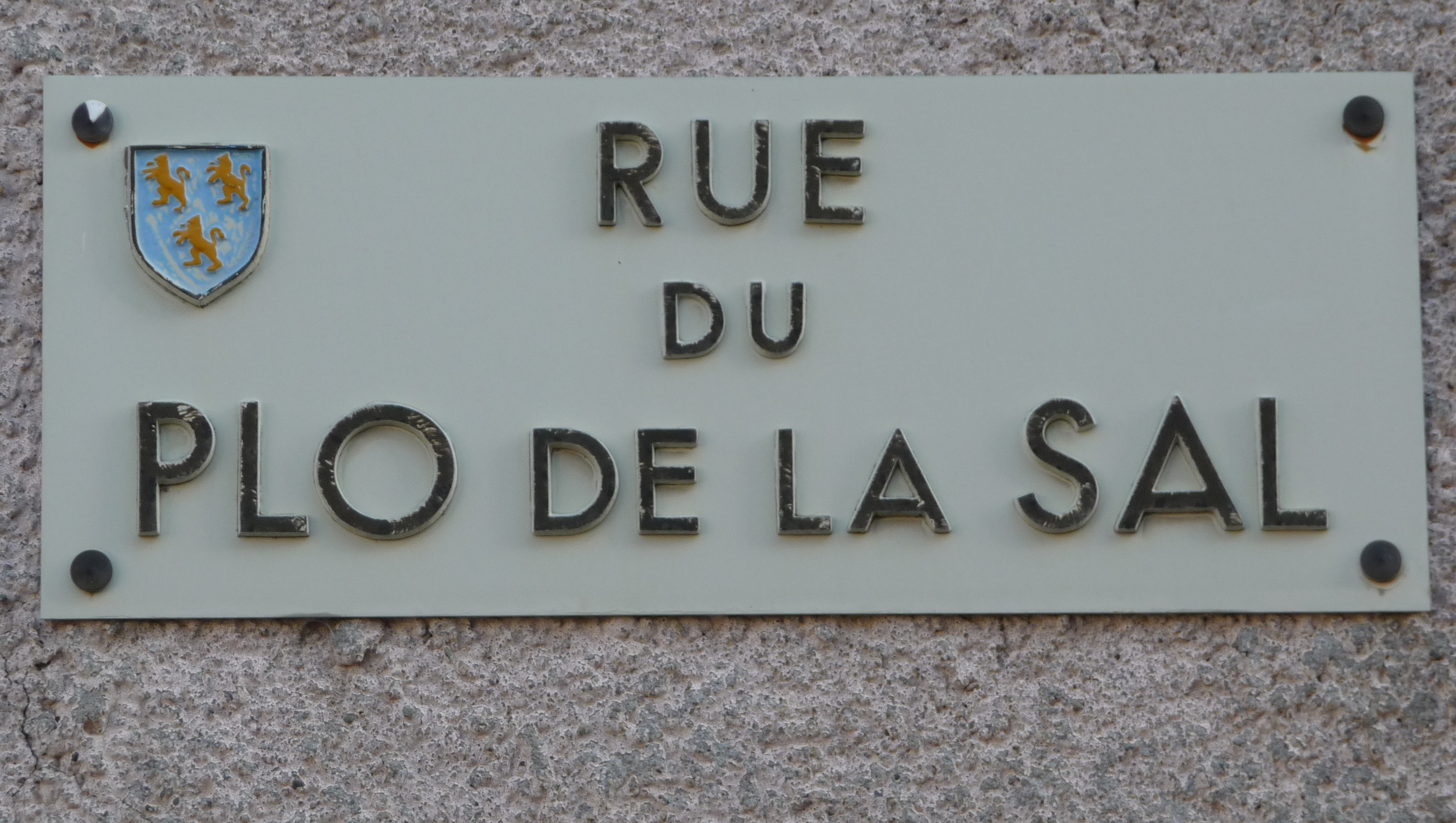
Local dialect street name

The Late Middle Ages saw turbulent times across Europe with the Black Death and the Hundred Years War dramatically affecting all areas. However, the implementation at Caunes of a commendam in 1467 indicates a decay of influence or period of relaxation of monastic values and possible partial abandonment of the Abbey.

Around 1590, during the French Wars of Religion, Caunes was pillaged by Huguenots and held under siege until eventually taken by Henri, Duc de Joyeuse. He ordered the demolition of the walls of the Abbey enclosure as well as the outer ring of town walls; only remnants of the walls exist today. A map showing the presumed outline of the walls is available from the Tourist Office.

It was not until the early 17th century, soon after the appointment of Abbot Jean d'Alibert in 1598, that restoration of the Abbey and associated buildings were undertaken. Moreover, he instigated reforms within the church and started to re-established the position of the Abbey as a Christian institution.

Much of the work was to little avail as by 1659 the Abbey had once again fallen into disrepair and the Abbey was removed from the Benedictine Order. In 1663 the Congregation of St. Maur took control and re-established a strict monastic regime, renovating the buildings at the same time. In 1761 a fire destroyed the courtroom and archives.

As with other religious houses, the French Revolution brought an end to monastic life at Caunes.

=== After the revolution ===
The ownership of the Abby buildings passed to the state around 1791, during the French Revolution, and the church building became the parish church of the town.

The Abbey church at Caunes was designated a National Monument in 1916 and the rest of the extensive associated buildings in 1948. Ownership of the Abbey has gradually passed to the town administration since 1986 and substantial renovations have allowed many of the buildings to open to the public in 2006.

=== Architecture ===
Nothing remains of the presumed Greco-Roman church underlying the existing building. The oldest part of the extant buildings is the original 8th-century Carolingian crypt. This is quadrangular with signature rounded external corners. It has a floor of large herringbone-laid cobbles and is believed to be unique. Some remnants of early carved capitals are now incorporated into the 12th-century north tower.

However, Caunes is famed for the large 11th-century apse at the eastern end of the Abbey. This is a fine example of the simple Romanesque building style of the region and is clearest from outside the building. The apse, locally called the chevet, consists of two levels of pillars supporting a conical roof. The older, lower, part is constructed from simply dressed limestone and pink marble and has eight pillars with capitals of interlacing plant design. There are no arches in the lower level, the pillars merely supporting simple stone lintels. There are three simple slit windows in this lower section.

The upper portion of the apse dates from the latter half of the 16th century and has nine square columns with arches above resting on simple capitals. The two side apses are very simple and serve to accentuate the subtleness of the main apse architecture.

The north tower predates the south tower but both were constructed in the 12th Century. The former has three levels of double, round arched openings on each face whilst the latter has just one high level of double arched openings. These are enhanced by the semicircular apse-like chapels at their base, the north chapel containing the relics of the four Caunes martyrs.

The nave is entered through a porch on the north side dating also from the 12th century, its arches incorporating intricate carvings. The roof of the porch was augmented by rib vaulting in sharp relief in the early 13th century. The nave itself was rebuilt in the 14th century and mock vaulted arches added in the 1770; however, tall medieval windows remain and allow light in from the south side.

Much of the internal decoration is in marble as befits a town partly built on the wealth of quarrying this stone. The high altar combines red Caunes and white Carrara marble and was carved by Italian craftsmen in the 18th century. Other notable carvings include the Virgin & child with saints Benedict & Bernard in the south apsidal chapel and the two white marble angels framing the sanctuary.

== Marble quarries ==
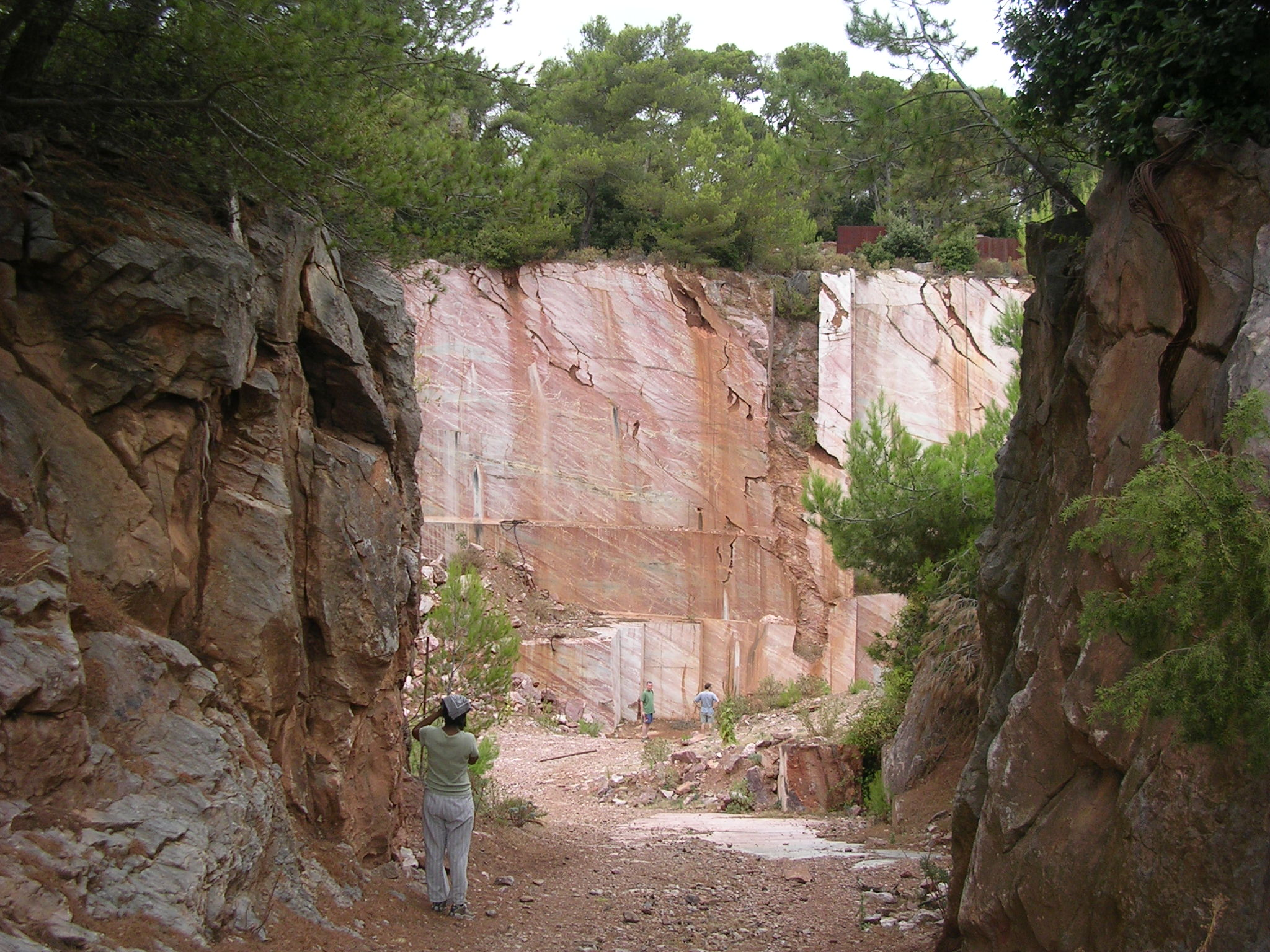
Mothballed marble quarry at Buffens

Caunes marble is generally red or pink, often with white spherical or elongated forms within it, although other colours are also found. It is metamorphosed from Devonian micritic limestones or mudstones which were predominantly red and homogeneous but had Stromatactis cavities subsequently infilled with white calcite. These outcrops hold large workable volumes of marble, some over 15 metres in height.

Quarrying has been undertaken in the vicinity of Caunes since at least the seventeenth century although there is some reasonable expectation that small quarries were exploited in Roman times. Red marble capitals and other details are evident in Languedoc churches dating from the 8th century. By the early 17th century exploitation appears to have been under the control of a Genoese master sculptor, Stefano Sorano who was granted a licence in 1663. He brought a number of Italian quarrymen to Caunes to develop the marble trade and some may have settled in the town as there still exists a small Italian contingent. Throughout the subsequent centuries there was close collaboration between Caunes and Carrara, famous for its white marble.

The marble quarry brought prosperity and kudos to Caunes and a railway spur was run across the plain from Moux in 1887 to transport passengers, quarried marble and the region's wine. The station was finally closed to passengers in 1939 and to goods in 1965. Some station buildings still retain a link with the past as a marble carving workshop.

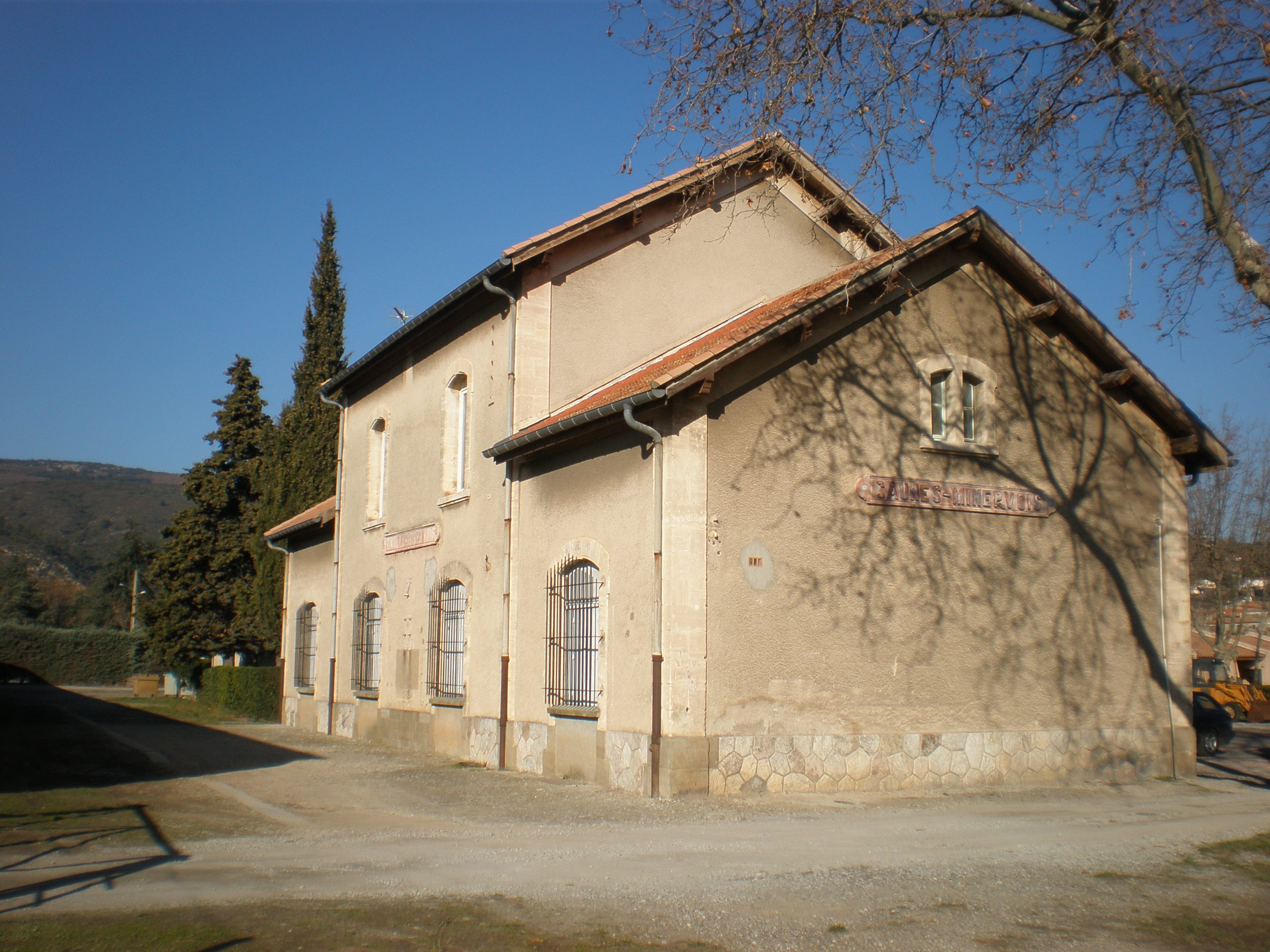
Old rail station, now a marble workshop

During the first part of the 20th century, and operating via a second station almost opposite the first, there was a 1-metre gauge tram line from Caunes connecting the town to Lezignan and Carcassonne. This tramway was closed down in 1932. This additional station may be seen in old postcards but is still in use as a private home today.

It is possible to see large, partly worked slabs and columns in the Carrière du Roy (or "King's Mines" in local dialect) 1 km from the town. This quarry was named for the most prestigious client, Louis XIV, rather than being owned by the king. Red Caunes marble was, for example, used to make the columns of the Grand Grand Trianon at Versailles, the Opera Garnier in Paris and columns of the Arc de Triomphe du Carrousel.

Two other large quarries exist near Villerambert, 2 km west of the town, and Buffens about 2 km east of Caunes opposite Notre Dame du Cros. All three of these are now classified as National Monuments.

Other, small derelict quarry workings can be seen in the vicinity. Two commercial quarries are currently being regularly exploited: one close to the Carrière du Roy and a second, more recently re-opened, above the Buffens quarry. Blocks are now usually exported for finishing in Italy from where they are sent around the world.

== Sights ==
- Napoleon's bridges
- Narbonensis
- Domitian Way
- capitelles
- Notre Dame du Cros

== Population ==
Historical population
Year	Pop.	±% p.a.
1968	1,681	—
1975	1,512	−1.50%
1982	1,550	+0.36%
1990	1,527	−0.19%
1999	1,476	−0.38%
2007	1,582	+0.87%
2012	1,678	+1.19%
2017	1,654	−0.29%
2023	1,554	−1.03%
Source: INSEE

== See also ==
- Communes of the Aude department
