= Clas Åkesson Tott =

Swedish Field Marshal (c. 1530–1590)

Clas Åkesson Tott (c. 1530–1596) was a military Field Marshal (1572) and member of the Privy Council of Sweden (1575).

== Biography ==
In the Russo-Swedish War (1554–1557), he was the rittmeister of the cavalry squadron Upplandsfanan. He became responsible for the enlistment of army personnel in Finland, in 1563. At the Battle of Axtorna, in 1566, he was taken as prisoner of war, but he was released in 1569. As the commander-in-chief of Estonia (1572–1574), he defeated the Russians at the Battle of Lode in 1573, before he was displaced by Pontus de la Gardie due to the disastrous outcome of the Siege of Wesenberg (1574).

He became the stadtholder of Finland in 1576, but he fell out of grace with John III which led to his losing his titles in 1589 and his membership in the Privy Council.

Clas Åkesson Tott was the grandfather of Åke Henriksson Tott (1598–1640) , a Swedish Fieldmarshal in 1631.

== Sources ==
Notes

General reference

- The article Tott, Clas Åkesson in Nationalencyklopedin (1995).
- The article Tott, Clas Åkesson in Biografiskt lexikon för Finland (2008).
