= Toolse =

Village in Estonia

Toolse Toolse
- Village
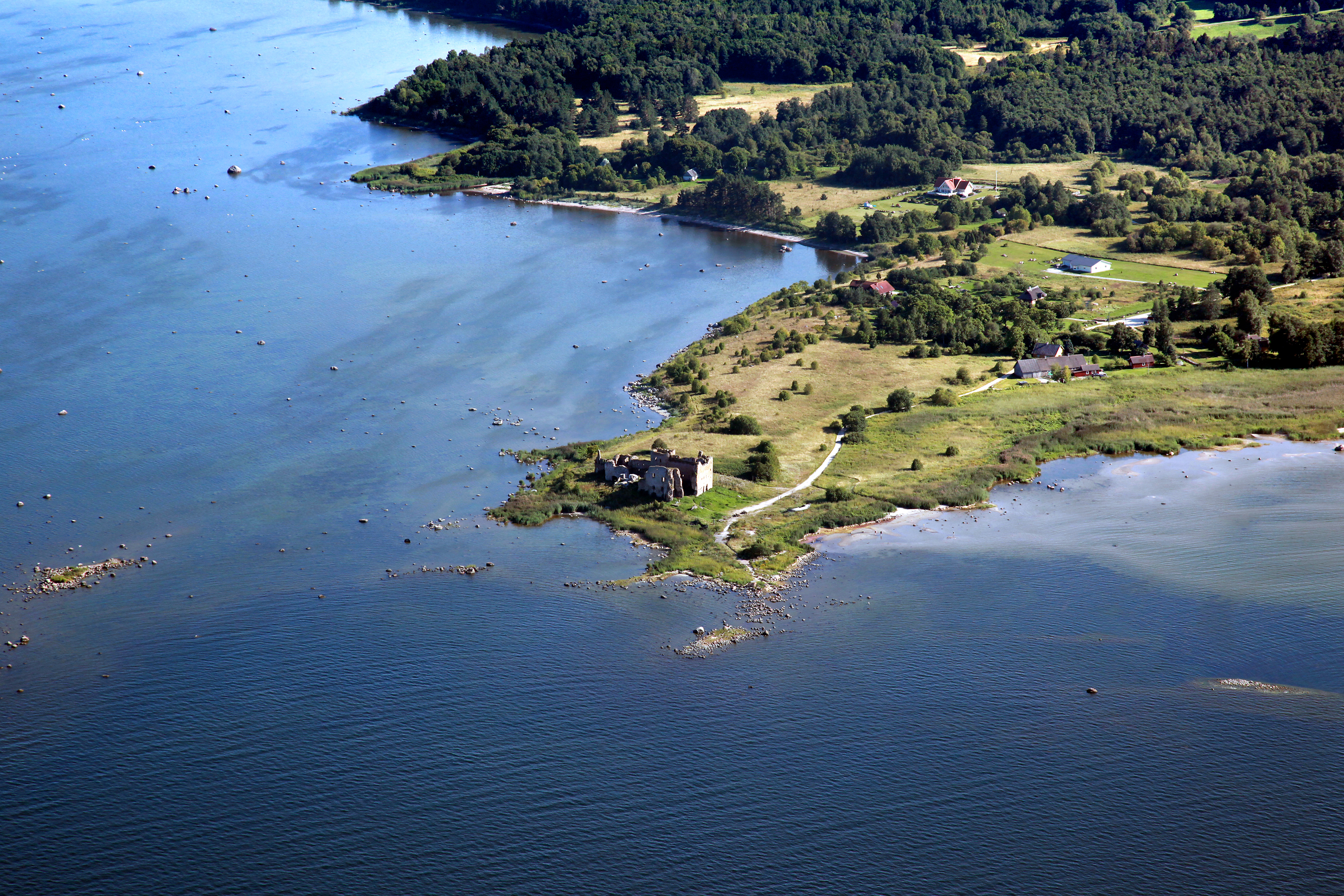
- Toolse village and castle

- Country: Estonia
- County: Lääne-Viru County
- Parish: Haljala Parish
- Time zone: UTC+2 (EET)
  - Summer (DST): UTC+3 (EEST)

Drone video of the castle taken in 2021.

Toolse is a village in Haljala Parish, Lääne-Viru County, in northeastern Estonia.

== Toolse castle ==
Toolse castle (German: Tolsburg) was a crusader castle belonging to the Teutonic Order. It was completed in 1471. At one point of time, it was reportedly the northernmost outpost of the Holy Roman Empire.

Today only ruins remain. A conservation and archaeological survey scheme has been carried out at the site since 2006.

== Gallery ==
A close up of the castle

Near the water in Toolse

== See also ==
- Toolse River
- List of castles in Estonia
