= 1630s =

Decade

The 1630s was a decade that began on January 1, 1630, and ended on December 31, 1640.

== Events ==
=== January–March ===
- January 2 – A shoemaker in Turin is found to have the first case of bubonic plague there as the plague of 1630 begins spreading through Italy.
- January 5 – A team of Portuguese military advisers to China's Ming dynasty government arrive at Zhuozhou. Led by Gonçalo Teixeira Corrêa, and accompanied by interpreter João Rodrigues, the group begins training the troops of Governor Sun Yuanhua in using modern cannons.
- January 11 – Otto III and his brother William Augustus, both, Dukes of Brunswick-Harburg, sell their rights to inherit rule of Brunswick-Lüneburg to Prince Christian in return for their debts of more than 150,000 thaler being paid.
- January 13 – In China, General Yuan Chonghuan is invited to an audience with the Chongzhen Emperor and is arrested on charges of collusion with the enemy. Yuan is executed by the slow death on September 22.
- January 18 – Nicolò Contarini is elected as the new Doge of the Republic of Venice and spends most of his time fighting a bubonic plague epidemic, but dies in office on April 2, 1631.
- February 22 – Native American Quadequine introduces popcorn to English colonists.
- March 3 – A fleet sent by the Dutch West India Company captures Recife from the Portuguese, establishing Dutch Brazil.
- March 9 – The 1630 Crete earthquake occurs.
- March – Fedorovych Uprising: Zaporozhian Cossacks rebel against the Polish–Lithuanian Commonwealth, and occupy a large part of modern-day Ukraine. After a number of indecisive skirmishes with a Polish army sent to pacify the region, the Treaty of Pereyaslav is signed, ending the uprising.

=== April–June ===
- April 8 – Puritan migration to New England (1620-1640): Winthrop Fleet – The ship Arbella and three others set sail from the Solent in England, with 400 passengers under the leadership of John Winthrop, headed for the Massachusetts Bay Colony in America; seven more, with another 300 aboard, follow in the next few weeks.
- May 4 – In an invasion of Persia, Ottoman Empire Grand Vizier Gazi Hüsrev Pasha routs the Persians in a battle at Mahidasht near Kermanshah.
- May 17
  - The first case of plague is reported in Milan. By the end of 1631, the city of 250,000 suffers 186,000 deaths, losing almost three-quarters of its population to plague.
  - Italian astronomers Niccolò Zucchi and Daniello Bartoli become the first scientists to observe the belts on the planet Jupiter.
- May 20 – The Swedish National Heritage Board (Riksantikvarieämbetet) is created, with Johannes Bureus as its first director. The Board is still in existence almost 400 years later.
- May 25 – Fedorovych uprising: The Zaporozhian Cossacks, led by Taras Triasylo, defeat Polish and Lithuanian troops led by General Stanisław Koniecpolski near Pereiaslav. The battle is later the subject of the Ukrainian language poem Tarasova nich.
- May 29 – The Battle of Villabuona is fought in Italy at Lombardy, with more than 4,000 French and Venetian troops killed in an attack by Matthias Gallas of the Holy Roman Empire's army.
- June 4 – Scottish-born Presbyterian (and former physician) Alexander Leighton is brought before Archbishop William Laud's Star Chamber court in London for publishing the seditious pamphlet An Appeale to the Parliament, or, Sions Plea Against the Prelacy, an attack on Anglican bishops (printed in the Netherlands, 1628). He is sentenced to be pilloried and whipped, have his ears cropped, one side of his nose slit, and his face branded with "SS" (for "sower of sedition"), to be imprisoned, and be degraded from holy orders.
- June 6 – Swedish warships depart from Stockholm, Sweden for Central Europe.
- June 12 – Massachusetts Bay Colony is founded, with John Winthrop as governor.
- June 14 – Passengers of the Arbella, including Anne Bradstreet, America's first poet of significance, finally set foot in the New World at Salem, Massachusetts.

=== July–September ===
- July 6
  - The Success, last ship of the Winthrop Fleet, lands safely at Salem harbor, Massachusetts Bay Colony.
  - Swedish intervention in the Thirty Years' War begins when King Gustavus Adolphus of Sweden, leading an army of 13,000 on the Protestant side, makes landfall at Peenemünde, Pomerania.
- July 9 – Thirty Years' War: Stettin is taken by Swedish forces.
- July 18 – War of the Mantuan Succession: Mantua is sacked by an army of the Holy Roman Empire, led by Count Johann von Aldringen.
- July 24 – The Sibbald baronets British nobility title is created.
- July 30 – John Winthrop helps in founding a church in Massachusetts, which will later become known as First Church in Boston.
- July – The Italian plague of 1629–31 reaches Venice.
- August 13 – Thirty Years' War: As a result of heavy pressure from the Prince-electors, Ferdinand II, Holy Roman Emperor, dismisses general Albrecht von Wallenstein from command of the Imperial Army.
- August 25 – Sinhalese–Portuguese War: In the Battle of Randeniwela on the island of Sri Lanka, King Senarat of Kandy leads more than 35,000 troops in killing most of an attack force led by Portuguese Ceylon governor Constantino de Sá de Noronha.
- September 4 – Thirty Years' War: the Treaty of Stettin is signed by Sweden and the Duchy of Pomerania, forming a close alliance between them, as well as giving Sweden full military control over Pomerania.
- September 7 – Governor John Winthrop passes a resolution declaring "that Trimontaine" on Shawmut peninsula shall be called Boston from now on.
- September 17 (September 7 Old Style) – The settlement of Boston, Massachusetts Bay Colony is founded.
- September 24 – The first ship of de Sauce's emigrants arrive at Southampton Hundred, on the James River in Virginia.

=== October–December ===
- October 13 – War of the Mantuan Succession: the Peace of Regensburg is signed. Charles Gonzaga is confirmed as Duke of Mantua.
- October 17 – Empress Meishō's Coronation takes place.
- October 18 – Frendraught Castle in Scotland, the home of James Crichton of Frendraught, burns down.
- November 10 – Day of the Dupes: Marie de' Medici attempts to oust Cardinal Richelieu from the French Court, but fails after two days.
- December 3 – (28 Rabi II 1040 AH) Abd Allah ibn Hasan is selected as the new Emir of Mecca after the death from tuberculosis of Mas'ud ibn Idris.

=== Date unknown ===
- Paramaribo (in modern-day Suriname) is first settled by the English.
- The Deccan Famine of 1630–32 in India begins; it will kill some two million.
- In the Mughal Empire, Shah Jahan's Pearl Mosque at Lahore Fort is consecrated (completed 1635).
- The central square of Covent Garden in London is laid out, and a market begins to develop there.
- Johann Heinrich Alsted's Encyclopaedia septem tomis distincta is published.
- Settlers leave Pannaway Plantation and begin to settle in Strawbery Banke which in 1653 is renamed Portsmouth, New Hampshire.

=== January–March ===
- January 23 – Thirty Years' War: Sweden and France sign the Treaty of Bärwalde, a military alliance in which France provides funds for the Swedish army invading northern Germany.
- February 5 – Puritan leader Roger Williams arrives in Boston.
- February 16 – The Reval Gymnasium is founded in Tallinn, Estonia, by Swedish king Gustavus II Adolphus.
- February 20 – A fire breaks out in Westminster Hall, but is put out before it can cause serious destruction.
- March 7 – Ambrósio I Nimi a Nkanga, the ruler of the Kingdom of Kongo (in what is now Angola) dies after a reign of five years.
- March 10 – Al Walid ben Zidan becomes the new Sultan of Morocco upon the death of Abu Marwan Abd al-Malik II.
- March 20 – The siege of the Protestant German city of Magdeburg by the Catholic League begins and lasts for more than two months before the city falls and the inhabitants are massacred.

=== April–June ===
- April 13 – Thirty Years' War: Gustavus Adolphus of Sweden defeats an imperial garrison at the city of Frankfurt an der Oder.
- May 18 – In Dorchester, Boston, John Winthrop takes the oath of office, and becomes the first Governor of Massachusetts.
- May 20 – Thirty Years' War: After a two-month siege, the Imperial Army of the Holy Roman Emperor, under the command of Johann Tserclaes, Count of Tilly sacks the Protestant German city of Magdeburg, and massacres over 20,000 inhabitants. Shocked by the massacre, many Protestant states in the Holy Roman Empire decide to ally with Gustavus Adolphus of Sweden, and support his ongoing invasion.
- May 28 – William Claiborne sails from England to establish a trading post on Kent Island, the first English settlement in Maryland.
- May 30
  - Thirty Years' War: Bavaria and France sign the Treaty of Fontainebleau, forming a secret alliance; however, this does not last long.
  - Gazette de France, the first weekly French newspaper, is published.
- June 17 – The death in childbirth of Mumtaz Mahal at Burhanpur causes her husband Shah Jahan to commission the Taj Mahal at Agra, as a mausoleum for her. Construction is started in 1632, and finished in 1653.
- June 19 – War of the Mantuan Succession: The Treaty of Cherasco is signed, ending the War of the Mantuan Succession.
- June 20 – Algerian pirates sack Baltimore, County Cork, in Ireland.

=== July–September ===
- July 9 – Koca Musa Pasha, the Ottoman Governor of Egypt, arranges the murder of Emir Kitas Bey, commander of Turkish troops who had been scheduled to invade Persia.
- July 16 – The city of Würzburg is taken by Gustavus Adolphus of Sweden, putting an end to the Würzburg witch trials, but not before an estimated 900 people from the city and its environs have been burned at the stake for witchcraft.
- July 22 – Thirty Years' War – Battle of Werben: Tilly defeats Gustavus Adolphus of Sweden, but not decisively.
- August 22 – The Treaty of Werben is signed as an alliance between Hesse-Cassel and Sweden.
- August 29 – (1 Safar 1041 A.H.) Abd Allah ibn Hasan, Emir of Mecca, abdicates in favor of two successors, his son Muhammad ibn Abd Allah and his great-nephew Zayd ibn Muhsin.
- August – Thirty Years' War: Running out of supplies, Tilly is forced to send his army into the Electorate of Saxony in order to secure supplies, as well as to force a reaction from John George, Elector of Saxony and Gustavus Adolphus of Sweden.
- August – The Martyrs of Mombasa were a group of approximately 288 Christians, Portuguese and African, killed in Mombasa (in present-day Kenya) in August 1631 during an uprising led by Yusuf ibn al-Hasan, the Swahili sultan of Mombasa.
- September 11 – Thirty Years' War: As a result of Tilly's invasion, John George, Elector of Saxony, who has until now stayed neutral, allies with Gustavus Adolphus of Sweden, in order to drive the Imperial army out of Saxony.
- September 12 – Eighty Years' War – Battle of Albrolhos: A Spanish fleet, under the command of Admiral Antonio de Oquendo, defeats a Dutch fleet off the coast of Brazil.
- September 13– Eighty Years' War – Battle of the Slaak: A Spanish fleet of 95 ships, carrying 5,500 soldiers tasked with taking over the Dutch Republic, is almost completely destroyed (with 83 ships sunk) the day after being intercepted by a Dutch fleet off of the coast of the Netherlands.
- September 17 – Thirty Years' War – Battle of Breitenfeld: Tilly's Holy Roman Imperial army is decisively defeated by Gustavus II Adolphus of Sweden, shattering the imperial army of the Holy Roman Empire, and marking the first significant victory for the Protestants in the war.

=== October–December ===
- October 10 – Thirty Years' War: A Saxon army takes over Prague.
- November 15 – King Gustavus Adolphus of Sweden takes possession of Prague, capital of Bohemia.
- November 21 – In Venice, a special mass celebrates the end of the two years of bubonic plague that had killed thousands of people.
- November 29 – The Treaty of Höchst is signed between King Gustavus Adolphus of Sweden and George II of Hesse-Darmstadt, with Darmstadt giving up the fortress of Rüsselsheim in return for Sweden's recognition of Darmstadt's neutrality.
- December 16 – A volcanic eruption of Mount Vesuvius at Pompeii occurs, for the first time in several centuries.
- December 23 – Thirty Years' War: Gustavus II Adolphus of Sweden takes the city of Mainz, without any resistance.

=== Date unknown ===
- Publication of
  - Moses Amyraut's Traite des Religions.
  - Antonio Colmenero de Ledesma's Chocolate: or, An Indian Drinke.

=== January–March ===
- January 8 – University of Amsterdam is established at the site of the Athenaeum Illustre of Amsterdam.
- January 31 – The dissection of a body for the benefit of medical students is carried out by Dr. Nicolaes Tulp, the anatomist for the city of Amsterdam, and will be immortalized in Rembrandt's painting The Anatomy Lesson.
- February 22 – Galileo's Dialogue Concerning the Two Chief World Systems is published in Florence.
- March 9 – Thirty Years' War: Battle of Bamberg – Johann Tserclaes, Count of Tilly, commander of the Catholic League, defeats the Swedish army under Gustav Horn, and recaptures the town of Bamberg.
- March 21 – Thirty Years' War: King Gustavus Adolphus makes a triumphant entry into Nuremberg, where he is welcomed by the populace and pledges to protect the cause of Protestantism.
- March 29 – The Treaty of Saint-Germain-en-Laye is signed, returning Quebec to French control, after the English had seized it in 1629.
- March – Thirty Years' War: Gustavus Adolphus invades Bavaria with his army.

=== April–June ===
- April 15 – Thirty Years' War: Battle of Rain – Gustavus Adolphus defeats Tilly's Catholic League armies for the second time within a year; Tilly is severely wounded during the battle and dies on April 30.
- May 17 – Thirty Years' War: Munich, capital of Bavaria, is captured by the Swedish army.
- June 15 – Sir Francis Windebank is made chief Secretary of State in England.
- June 17 – Shah Jahan's beloved wife Mumtaz Mahal dies, after giving birth to their 14th child. Soon after, construction of the Taj Mahal, begins.
- June 20
  - Charles I of England issues a charter for the colony of Maryland (named in honor of Henrietta Maria), under the control of Lord Baltimore.
  - Two ships, Saint Jean (250 tons) and L'Esperance-en-Dieu, set sail from La Rochelle in France, bound for Acadia in North America.
- June 25 – Fasilides, Emperor of Ethiopia in succession to his father Susenyos, declares the state religion of the country again to be Ethiopian Orthodox Christianity, and confiscates the lands of the Jesuit missionaries, relegating them to Fremona.
- June 30 – The University of Tartu is founded.
- June – Eighty Years' War: Leading a Dutch army, Frederick Henry, Prince of Orange captures in short succession the cities of Venlo, Roermond and Sittard, before besieging the city of Maastricht.

=== July–September ===
- July 23 – Three hundred colonists for New France depart Dieppe.
- August 22 – Eighty Years' War: A Dutch army, led by Frederick Henry, Prince of Orange, captures the city of Maastricht after a two-month siege.
- September 1 – Battle of Castelnaudary: A rebellion against French king Louis XIII is crushed. The leader of the rebellion, Gaston, Duke of Orléans, the brother of Louis XIII, surrenders.
- September 3 – The last executions of Christians in Japan take place as four Spanish missionaries (including Augustinin friar Bartholomew Gutierrez) and two Japanese converts are burned alive in Nagasaki. They are beatified in 1867 as the last of the 205 Martyrs of Japan.
- September 9 – Thirty Years' War: Battle of the Alte Veste – Besieged by Wallenstein at Nuremberg, Swedish king Gustavus Adolphus attempts to break the siege, but is defeated.
- September 25 – Yakutsk, Russia is founded by Pyotr Beketov.

=== October–December ===
- October 15 – The University of Tartu officially opens, in Swedish Livonia.
- October 30 – Henri II de Montmorency, is executed for his participation in the rebellion of Gaston, Duke of Orléans, against French king Louis XIII.
- November 8 – Wladyslaw IV Waza is elected king of the Polish–Lithuanian Commonwealth, after Sigismund III Vasa's death.
- November 16 (November 6 Old Style) – Thirty Years' War: Battle of Lützen in Saxony – Swedish king Gustavus Adolphus leads an assault on Wallenstein's army, but is killed early in the battle, despite which the Swedish commanders manage to rally the army and eventually defeat Wallenstein, who withdraws from Saxony. Following the death of Gustavus Adolphus, he is succeeded as ruler of Sweden by his six-year-old daughter Christina, while five regents (headed by Axel Oxenstierna) govern the country. On November 17, Gottfried zu Pappenheim, Field Marshal of the Holy Roman Empire, dies from wounds sustained in the battle.
- December 6 – Indians wipe out a new Dutch settlement of Swanadael in New Netherland.

=== Date unknown ===
- Antigua and Barbuda is first colonized by England.
- The Portuguese are driven out of Bengal.
- King Władysław IV Vasa of Poland forbids anti-Semitic books and printings.
- The rural parish of Loppi was founded.
- Construction of the Taj Mahal begins.
- Catharina Stopia succeeds her spouse as Sweden's ambassador to Russia, becoming perhaps the first female diplomat in Europe.
- Approximate date – Last inhabitants leave the original city of Reimerswaal in Zeeland.

=== January–March ===
- January 20 – Galileo Galilei, having been summoned to Rome on orders of Pope Urban VIII, leaves for Florence for his journey. His carriage is halted at Ponte a Centino at the border of Tuscany, where he is quarantined for 22 days because of an outbreak of the plague.
- February 6 – the formal coronation of Władysław IV Vasa as King of Poland takes place at the cathedral in Kraków. He had been elected as king on November 8.
- February 9 – the Duchy of Hesse-Cassel captures Dorsten from the Electorate of Cologne without resistance.
- February 13
  - Galileo Galilei arrives in Rome for his trial before the Inquisition.
  - Fire engines are used for the first time in England in order to control and extinguish a fire that breaks out at London Bridge, but not before 43 houses are destroyed.
- March 1 – Samuel de Champlain reclaims his role as commander of New France, on behalf of Cardinal Richelieu.

=== April–June ===
- April 12 – Galileo Galilei is convicted of heresy by the Roman Catholic Church.
- May 22 – Samuel de Champlain, founder of the French colony of New France, returns to Quebec after being gone for four years, commissioned as Lieutenant General of the troops of New France, but not as governor.
- May 28 – Aurangzeb, Crown Prince of the Mughal Empire in India, narrowly escapes death when an elephant stampedes through his encampment, but is able to defend himself with a lance.
- June 18 – Charles I is crowned King of Scots at St Giles' Cathedral, Edinburgh, according to Anglican rite in his first visit to Scotland since early childhood, although he has been Scottish monarch since 1625.
- June 22 – the Roman Catholic Church forces Galileo Galilei to recant his heliocentric view of the Solar System. According to legend, he claims Eppur si muove.

=== July–September ===
- July 7 – the Dutch East India Company fleet, led by Hans Putmans, attacks its ally Zheng Zhilong's base by surprise, near Xiamen.
- July 8
  - Thirty Years' War: Battle of Oldendorf – Sweden defeats the Holy Roman Empire near Hessisch Oldendorf.
  - The Javanese calendar is commenced on this day by the order of Sultan Agung of the Mataram Sultanate. It is the Javanese adaptation of the Hijri calendar, but it continues the year numbering of the Shaka era widely used in Java then, thus the calendar's epoch is 1 Sura 1555 AJ, corresponding with 1 Muharram 1043 AH.
- August 6 – William Laud becomes Archbishop of Canterbury.
- September 25 – King Louis XIII enters into Nancy, marking the occupation of the Duchy of Lorraine by France.
- September 26 – a group from the Plymouth Colony settles in Windsor, Connecticut, making it the first settlement in the state.

=== October–December ===
- October 17 – Thirty Years' War: Siege of Rheinfelden – Spain recaptures Rheinfelden from Sweden.
- October 22 – Battle of Liaoluo Bay: A large Ming dynasty fleet under Zheng Zhilong defeats a Dutch East India Company fleet at the island of Quemoy.
- November 11 – the Dutch expedition of Jan Janszoon van Hoorn, against Spanish pirates in Central America, ends after six months with van Hoorn's success.
- November 22 – commissioned by Cecil Calvert, 2nd Baron Baltimore to transport 140 English colonists to the province of Maryland in America, The Ark and another ship, the Dove (with 128 settlers), depart Gravesend in England for the New World. Three days later, the two ships become separated by a storm in the English Channel, and the crew of The Ark assumes that the Dove sank.
- November 29 – The Ark runs into a more violent storm, but manages to stay afloat and to continue on its journey to America. The Dove turns out to have survived the storms, and both ships will arrive in Maryland on February 24.
- December 9 – Francisco de Murga, Spain's Governor of the South American province of Cartagena (now in Colombia), crushes a revolt by escaped African slaves in an attack against the palenque of Limón. De Murga captures 80 residents, and, after a trial, has 13 executed, with the drawing and quartering of their bodies.

=== Date unknown ===
- The Jews of Poznań are granted the privilege of forbidding Christians to enter into their city quarter.
- Emperor of Ethiopia Fasilides expels Jesuit missionaries.
- Shogun Tokugawa Iemitsu of Japan issues the Sakoku Edict of 1635 outlawing Christianity, enforcing a policy of extreme isolationism (sakoku) until 1853.
- St Columb's Cathedral, Derry, Ireland, the first post-Reformation Anglican cathedral built in the British Isles and the first Protestant cathedral built in Europe, is completed.
- Mission San Luis de Apalachee is built in the New World by two Spanish friars.
- English colonists settle what will become the town of Hingham, Massachusetts.
- A professorship in Arabic studies is founded at the University of Cambridge in England.
- Trịnh–Nguyễn War: Trịnh Tráng launched an attack on Đàng Trong at the Nhật Lệ estuary. This was marked as the second clash in the civil war.

=== January–March ===
- January 12 – After suspecting that he will be dismissed, Albrecht von Wallenstein, supreme commander of the Holy Roman Empire's Army, demands that his colonels sign a declaration of personal loyalty.
- January 14 – France's Compagnie normande obtains a one-year monopoly on trade with the African kingdoms in Guinea.
- January 19 – Charles IV, Duke of Lorraine abdicates in favor of his brother Nicholas II, who is only able to hold the duchy for 75 days.
- January 24 – Ferdinand II, Holy Roman Emperor, signs a classified order dismissing Albrecht von Wallenstein, the supreme commander of the Imperial Army.
- February 18 – Emperor Ferdinand II's dismissal of Commander Wallenstein for high treason, and the order for his capture, dead or alive, is made public.
- February 24 – By this date, the Paulaner Brewery is established in Munich, by Minim friars.
- February 25 – Rebel Scots and Irish soldiers assassinate Bohemian military leader Albrecht von Wallenstein at Cheb.
- March 1 – The Russians vacate their camp, ending the Siege of Smolensk.
- March 4 – Belgian scientist Jan Baptist van Helmont is interrogated by the Spanish Inquisition and put under house arrest for his experiments into plant growth.
- March 25 – Leonard Calvert arrives in Maryland, with Jesuit missionaries Andrew White, John Altham Gravenor, and Thomas Gervase, establishing St. Mary's as the fourth permanent settlement in British North America. In this year they also establish an institution of higher learning here, which later becomes Georgetown University, the United States's oldest university.

=== April–June ===
- April 1 – Nicholas II, Duke of Lorraine, who assumed rule of the duchy on January 19 upon the abdication of his older brother Charles IV abdicates in favor of Charles.
- April 14 – The Battle of Amritsar begins in India when Mughal Empire troops attempt to eliminate the Sikh religious leader, Guru Hargobind, by attacking Amritsar. The Sikh defenders hand the Mughal invaders an unprecedented defeat.
- May 2 – With Albrecht Wallenstein having been eliminated, the Holy Roman Emperor Ferdinand II personally takes command of the Imperial Army.
- May 5 – King Charles I of England and Scotland first refers to the banner of the British Isles as the "Union Flag" in a proclamation that the flag shall not be used on any ships other than those "in our immediate Service and Pay, and none other." The term evolves into the description of the British flag as the "Union Jack".
- June 14 – The Treaty of Polyanovka is signed between the Polish–Lithuanian Commonwealth and the Tsardom of Russia, concluding the Smolensk War.
- April – The first performance of the Oberammergau Passion Play is held in Bavaria.

=== July–September ===
- July 4 – The city of Trois-Rivières is founded in New France, in what is the modern-day Canadian province of Quebec.
- July 29 – Curaçao is captured by the Dutch.
- August 18 – In France, Urbain Grandier, accused of wizardry, is burned alive in Loudun.
- August (prob.) – Jean Nicolet becomes the first European to set foot in what becomes the U.S. state of Wisconsin. He is in search of a water-route to the Pacific, when he lands at Green Bay of Lake Michigan.
- September 6 – The Battle of Nördlingen ends after two days with a decisive victory for the Imperial Army and Habsburg Spain over the Army of Sweden and Protestant German troops.
- September 12 – A gunpowder factory explodes in Valletta, Malta, killing 22 people and damaging several buildings.

=== October–December ===
- October 11 – The Burchardi flood (also known as the second Grote Mandrenke) strikes the North Sea coast of Germany and Denmark, causing at least 8,000 deaths and perhaps as many as 12,000.
- November 11 – The Irish House of Commons passes an Act for the Punishment of the Vice of Buggery.
- December 8 – Francesco Niccolini obtains an audience with Pope Urban VIII and pleads him to reconsider the Church's punishment of astronomer Galileo Galilei. The Pope replies that although he esteems Galileo highly, nothing will change.
- December 16 – Gregorio Panzani, an emissary of Pope Urban VIII, is welcomed in England by King Charles I, marking the first time since England's break with the Roman Catholic Church that a monarch has received an agent of the Vatican.

=== Date unknown ===
- The English establish a settlement at Cochin (modern-day Kochi) on the Malabar Coast.
- Suspecting that Patriarch Afonso Mendes played a part in the Portuguese assault on Mombasa, Emperor Fasilides expels him and several Jesuit missionaries from Ethiopia.
- Cardinal Richelieu gathers members for the Académie Française which will be formally established in 1635).
- Moses Amyraut's Traité de la predestination is published.

=== January–March ===
- January 23 – 1635 Capture of Tortuga: The Spanish Navy captures the Caribbean island of Tortuga off of the coast of Haiti after a three-day battle against the English and French Navy.
- January 25 – King Thalun moves the capital of Burma from Pegu to Ava.
- February 22 – The Académie française in Paris is formally constituted, as the national academy for the preservation of the French language.
- March 22 – The Peacock Throne of India's Mughal Empire is inaugurated in a ceremony in Delhi to support the seventh anniversary of Shah Jahan's accession to the throne as Emperor.
- March 26 – Philipp Christoph von Sötern, the Archbishop-Elector of Trier, is taken prisoner in a surprise attack by Spanish Habsburg troops, leading to a declaration of war against Spain by France and the beginning of the Franco-Spanish War.

=== April–June ===
- April 13 – Druze warlord Fakhr-al-Din II is executed in Constantinople.
- April 23 – Boston Latin School, the oldest school in what will become the United States of America, is founded in Boston, Massachusetts.
- May 19 – France declares war on Spain.
- May 30 – Thirty Years' War – The Peace of Prague is signed, which ends the German civil war aspect of the conflict.
- June 28 – France's Compagnie des Îles de l'Amérique begins its occupation of the Caribbean island of Guadeloupe, with Charles Liénard de L'Olive as its first Governor.

=== July–September ===
- July 31 – The Royal Mail service is made available to the public by Charles I of England.
- August 3 – Cossack rebel leader Ivan Sulyma stages a surprise attack on Poland's newly constructed Kodak fortress, and his raiders kill most of the 200 mercenaries stationed there. Sulyma and his allies are captured by the army of Stanisław Koniecpolski, and Sulyma is executed on December 12.
- August 25 – The Great Colonial Hurricane strikes Narragansett Bay as a possible Category 3 hurricane, killing over 46 people.
- September 12 – The Treaty of Sztumska Wieś is signed between Sweden and the Polish–Lithuanian Commonwealth.

=== October–December ===
- October 9 – Rhode Island founder Roger Williams is banished from Massachusetts Bay Colony as a religious dissident, after speaking out against punishments for religious offenses, and giving away Native American land.
- November 15 – Thomas Parr, dead at the alleged age of 152, is buried in Westminster Abbey.
- November 22 – The Dutch pacification campaign on Formosa, against Taiwanese aborigines, begins.
- December 23 – Shah Jahan, Emperor of India's Mughal Empire, issues a decree against Portuguese Jesuits, ordering that the Agra Church be demolished and barring them from attempting to convert Hindus and Muslims to the Christian faith, but allows them to conduct their religious ceremonies in private.

=== Date unknown ===
- Guadeloupe and Martinique are colonized by France.
- Dominica is claimed by France.
- The Ottomans are expelled from Yemen.
- In Edo period Japan, the Sakoku Edict of 1635 enforces isolationism. Japanese are forbidden to travel abroad and unauthorised Europeans forbidden to enter under penalty of death. Christianity (Catholicism) is absolutely prohibited. Foreign merchants – Chinese and those of the Dutch East India Company – are restricted to enclaves in Nagasaki and access by the Portuguese is completely forbidden: an imperial memorandum decrees, "Hereafter entry by the Portuguese galeota is forbidden. If they insist on coming, the ships must be destroyed and anyone aboard those ships must be beheaded."
- In the Mughal Empire, Shah Jahan's Pearl Mosque at Lahore Fort is completed.
- Nagyszombat University (predecessor of Budapest University) is established.
- Willem and Joan Blaeu publish the first edition of their Atlas Novus, in Amsterdam.

=== January–March ===
- January 1 – Anthony van Diemen takes office as Governor-General of the Dutch East Indies (now Indonesia), and will serve until his death in 1645.
- January 18 – The Duke's Mistress, the last play by James Shirley, is given its first performance.
- February 21 – Al Walid ben Zidan, Sultan of Morocco, is assassinated by French renegades.
- February 26 – Nimi a Lukeni a Nzenze a Ntumba is installed as King Alvaro VI of Kongo, in the area now occupied by the African nation of Angola, and rules until his death on February 22, 1641.
- March 5 (February 24 Old Style) – King Christian IV of Denmark and Norway gives an order, that all beggars that are able to work must be sent to Brinholmen, to build ships or to work as galley rowers.
- March 13 (March 3 Old Style) – A "great charter" to the University of Oxford establishes the Oxford University Press, as the second of the privileged presses in England.
- March 26 – Utrecht University is founded in the Dutch Republic.

=== April–June ===
- April 30 – Eighty Years' War: The nine-month Siege of Schenkenschans ends, when forces of the Dutch Republic recapture the strategically important fort from the Spanish.
- May 14 – William Pynchon and his men establish the settlement of Agawam Plantation (now Springfield, Massachusetts) in territory controlled by the Agawam people, a subset of the Algonquian peoples, and negotiate for its purchase for Britain's Connecticut Colony. The Agawams deed the land to Connecticut on July 15, and the area is later deeded by Connecticut to the Massachusetts Bay Colony.
- June 20 – Roger Williams and other Puritan settlers become founders of the colony of Providence Plantations, which later joins neighbouring territory to become the colony of Rhode Island and Providence Plantations. The area today is the U.S. state of Rhode Island.
- June 22 – The Battle of Tornavento is fought in north-west Italy in the course of the Thirty Years' War, as France and Savoy respond to an attack by Spain. While the battle is a stalemate, the city of Castano Primo is heavily damaged.

=== July–September ===
- July 10 – The Senate of the Venetian Republic votes, 82 to 4, in favor of renewing the charter of Jewish merchants to sell within the city, after a delay of almost six months.
- July 20 – The Pequot War begins in New England when John Oldham and several of his crew are killed when his ship is attacked and robbed, apparently by allies of the Narragansett Indians at Block Island.
- July 30 – In France, Cardinal Richelieu persuades King Louis XIII to issue an ordonnance excusing the French nobility from military service if they pay a tax which allows the hiring of paid cavalry.
- August 15 – The Spanish capture Corbie, France.
- August 25 (August 15 Old Style) – The covenant of the Town of Dedham, Massachusetts Bay Colony is first signed.
- September 18 (September 8 Old Style) – A vote of the Great and General Court of the Massachusetts Bay Colony establishes New College (Harvard University), as the first college founded in the United States.

=== October–December ===
- October 4 (September 24 Old Style) – Thirty Years' War – Battle of Wittstock: A Swedish-allied army defeats a combined Imperial-Saxon army.
- October 28 – Harvard University was founded.
- November 5 – English theologian Henry Burton preaches two sermons on Guy Fawkes Day, heavily critical of the Anglican bishops, and is soon summoned before the Star Chamber.
- November 14 – French recapture Corbie from the Spanish
- December 23 (December 13 Old Style) – The Massachusetts Bay Colony organizes three militia regiments to defend the colony against the Pequot Indians. This organization is recognized today as the founding of the United States National Guard.

=== Date unknown ===
- Thirty Years' War: French intervention starts.
- Manchus occupy the Liaoning region in north China, select Shenyang (Mukden) as their capital, and proclaim the new Qing dynasty (pure).
- Establishment of Kohra (estate) by Babu Himmat Sah.
- The shōgun forbids Japanese to travel abroad, and those abroad from returning home.
- Emperor Fasilides founds the city of Gondar, which becomes the capital of Ethiopia for the next two centuries.
- The first American ancestor of John Adams, Henry Adams, emigrates to Massachusetts.
- The first synagogue of the New World, Kahal Zur Israel Synagogue, is founded in Recife by the Dutch.

=== January–March ===
- January 5 – Pierre Corneille's tragicomedy Le Cid is first performed, in Paris, France.
- January 16 – The siege of Nagpur ends in the modern-day Maharashtra state of India, as Kok Shah, the King of Deogarh, surrenders his kingdom to the Mughal Empire.
- January 23 – John Maurice, Prince of Nassau-Siegen arrives from the Netherlands to become the Governor of Dutch Brazil, and extends the range of the colony over the next six years.
- January 28 – Qing invasion of Joseon: The Manchu armies of China complete their invasion of northern Korea with the surrender of King Injo of the Joseon Kingdom.
- February 3 – Tulip mania collapses in the Dutch Republic.
- February 15 – Ferdinand III becomes Holy Roman Emperor upon the death of his father, Ferdinand II, although his formal coronation does not take place until later in the year.
- February 18 – Eighty Years' War: Battle off Lizard Point – Off the coast of Cornwall, England, a Spanish fleet intercepts an Anglo-Dutch merchant convoy of 44 vessels escorted by six warships, destroying or capturing 20 of them.
- March 6 – The world's first opera house, Teatro San Cassiano, opens in Venice with the premiere of L'Andromeda, with music by Francesco Manelli and libretto by Benedetto Ferrari.
- March 25 – The Blessed Virgin is proclaimed Queen of Genoa.

=== April–June ===
- April 10 – Plymouth Colony grants the "tenn menn of Saugust" a new settlement on Cape Cod, later named Sandwich, Massachusetts.
- April 30 – King Charles I of England issues a proclamation, attempting to stem emigration to the North American colonies.
- May 26 – Pequot War: Mystic massacre – A band of English settlers under Captain John Mason, and their Narragansett and Mohegan allies, set fire to a fortified village of the Mashantucket Pequot Tribe near the Mystic River. Between 400 and 700 people, mostly women, children and old men, are killed.
- May – Chinese encyclopedist Song Yingxing publishes his Tiangong Kaiwu ("Exploitation of the Works of Nature"), considered one of the most valuable encyclopedias of classical China.
- June 27 – The first English venture to China is attempted by Captain John Weddell, who sails into port in Macau and Canton during the late Ming dynasty with six ships. The voyages are for trade, which is dominated here by the Portuguese (at this time combined with the power of Spain). He brings 38,421 pairs of eyeglasses, perhaps the first recorded European-made eyeglasses to enter China.

=== July–September ===
- July 23
  - After a court battle, King Charles I of England hands over title to the North American colony of Massachusetts to Sir Ferdinando Gorges, one of the founders of Plymouth Council for New England.
  - Introduction of a new Scottish Prayer Book is met with widespread demonstrations, notably that of Jenny Geddes at St Giles' Cathedral, Edinburgh, who is said to have thrown a stool at the Dean's head.
- August 16 – Adam Olearius, sent along with Philipp Crusius and Otto Bruggemann by the German Duke of Holstein-Gottorp to establish a trade deal with Persia, is welcomed by the Safavid ruler, the Shah Safi at the Persian capital, Isfahan.
- August 25 – Eighty Years' War: A force of 17,000 Spanish troops, led by the Spanish Netherlands Governor-General, Don Fernando de Austria, recaptures the city of Venlo from the Dutch Republic after a five-day siege.
- August 29 – Fighting in the modern-day West African nation of Ghana, troops of the Dutch West India Company capture the Portuguese territory of the Gold Coast after the five-day Battle of Elmina.
- September 29 – The last five of the "16 Martyrs of Japan" are executed for illegally attempting to spread Christianity in Japan. Lorenzo Ruiz, Guillaume Courtet, Michael de Aozaraza, Vincent Shiwozuka and Lazarus of Kyoto are all put to death by the slow hanging torture of ana-tsurushi. They will be canonized 350 years later as saints of the Roman Catholic Church, on October 18, 1987.

=== October–December ===
- October 13 – English Royal Navy first-rate ship of the line Sovereign of the Seas is launched at Woolwich Dockyard at a cost of £65,586, adorned from stern to bow with gilded carvings, after a design by Anthony van Dyck.
- November 18 – The coronation as the new Holy Roman Emperor of Ferdinand III, Archduke of Austria, King of Hungary, Croatia and Bohemia, takes place in Vienna.
- December 17 – The Shimabara Rebellion erupts in Japan, when 30,000 peasants in the heavily Catholic area of northern Kyūshū revolt.

=== Date unknown ===
- Pierre de Fermat makes a notation, in a document margin, claiming to have proof of what will become known as Fermat's Last Theorem.
- René Descartes promotes intellectual rigour in his Discourse on the Method, and introduces the Cartesian coordinate system in its appendix La Géométrie (published in Leiden).
- France places a few missionaries in the Ivory Coast, a country it will rule more than 200 years later.
- Scottish army officer Robert Monro publishes Monro, His Expedition With the Worthy Scots Regiment Called Mac-Keys in London, the first military history in English.
- Elizabeth Poole becomes the first female founder of a town (Taunton, Massachusetts) in the Americas.
- Richard Norwood's book The Seaman's Practice is published for the first time.

=== January–March ===
- January 4
  - A naval battle takes place in the Indian Ocean, off the coast of Goa in South India, as a Netherlands fleet commanded by Admiral Adam Westerwolt decimates the Portuguese fleet.
  - A fleet of 80 Spanish ships led by Governor-General Sebastián Hurtado de Corcuera attacks the Sultanate of Sulu in the Philippines by beginning an invasion of Jolo island, but Sultan Muwallil Wasit I puts up a stiff resistance.
- January 8 – Shimabara Rebellion: The siege of Shimabara Castle ends after 27 days in Japan's Tokugawa shogunate (part of modern-day Nagasaki prefecture) as the rebel peasants flee reinforcements sent by the shogun Tokugawa Iemitsu.
- January 22 – The Shimabara and Amakusa rebels, having joined up after fleeing the shogun's troops, begin the defense of Hara Castle in modern-day Minamishimabara in the Nagasaki prefecture. The siege lasts more than 11 weeks before the peasants are massacred.
- February 28 – The Scottish National Covenant is signed in Edinburgh, Scotland, in opposition to changes to the Church of Scotland proposed by King Charles I.
- March 3 – Thirty Years' War: Battle of Rheinfelden – A mercenary army under Bernard of Saxe-Weimar, fighting for France, defeats forces of the Holy Roman Empire.
- March 5 – Thirty Years' War: The Treaty of Hamburg is signed by France and Sweden, providing the latter with funds.
- March 22
  - Mughal Emperor Shah Jahan and his sons capture the city of Kandahar from the Safavids.
  - Anne Hutchinson is banished from the Massachusetts Bay Colony for heresy and goes to Rhode Island.
- March 28 – Dutch merchant Willem Kieft is appointed Director of New Netherland by the Dutch East India Company to succeed Wouter van Twiller.
- March 29 – Settlers from Sweden arrive on the ships Kalmar Nyckel and Fogel Grip to establish the settlement of New Sweden in Delaware, beginning the Swedish colonization of the Americas.

=== April–June ===
- April 3 – Preacher John Wheelwright is banished from Boston and founds Exeter, New Hampshire.
- April 14 – The Netherlands colonizes Mauritius, with colonists from the ship Dragon going ashore after sighting it the day before, an event chronicled by British traveler Peter Mundy.
- April 15 – Shogunate forces defeat the last remnants of the Shimabara Rebellion, in the fortress of Hara. In the aftermath, suppression of Christianity is strictly enforced, Portuguese traders are expelled and Japan enters more than two centuries of isolationism.
- April 25 – Settlement of what will become New Haven, Connecticut begins.
- May 13 – Construction begins on the Red Fort in Delhi (India) for Mughal Emperor Shah Jahan who is transferring his capital there from Agra.
- May 23 – The Kandyan Treaty is signed between Singhala King Rajasimha II and the Dutch, to rid Ceylon of the Portuguese.
- June 20 – Eighty Years' War: Battle of Kallo – Spanish troops under Ferdinand of Austria defeat a much larger Dutch force, near Antwerp.
- June 27 – Patriarch Cyril of Constantinople is deposed for high treason, strangled and thrown into the sea by Janissaries, on Ottoman Sultan Murad IV's command.

=== July–September ===
- July 16 – Thirty Years' War: The siege of Saint-Omer ends after almost two months as the French-held Flemish city falls after being besieged by Spanish and German troops.
- July 20 – Scottish Covenanters meet at Muchalls Castle to compose a response to the 14 demands of the Bishops of Aberdeen.
- July 28 – Thirty Years' War: Swedish Army Field Marshal Johan Banér begins a destructive campaign against the Duchy of Pomerania, held by the Holy Roman Empire.
- August 15 – The Portuguese expedition led by Pedro Teixeira completes the first ascent of the Amazon River, crossing the Quijos River and arriving at Quito in Ecuador soon after (the same trip had been made in the opposite direction, in 1541).
- August 22 – Franco-Spanish War (1635–1659): The Battle of Getaria is fought between the navies of France and Spain, with the French sinking all 17 Spanish Navy ships and killing 2,000 Spanish sailors and officers.
- August 27 – Tayyar Mehmed Pasha becomes the new Grand Vizier of the Ottoman Empire after Bayram Pasha dies while fighting in Baghdad.
- September 6 – The Finnish mail service, predecessor of Posti Group, is established.
- September 21 – The Treaty of Hartford is signed, ending the Pequot War between British American colonists and the Pequot.
- September – John Spofford arrives in Boston Harbor, on the ship John of London, and is one of the first people to establish Rowely, Essex County, Massachusetts.

=== October–December ===
- October 21 – The Great Thunderstorm in Widecombe-in-the-Moor, England: probable ball lightning strikes the parish church, killing 4 and injuring about 60.
- November 21 – The General Assembly of the Church of Scotland is summoned to Glasgow, by King Charles I.
- November 24 – New Haven, the first planned city in America, is founded when local Indians make a deed of Quinnipiac to Theophilus Eaton and other English settlers.
- December 18 – Cardinal Mazarin becomes the first adviser to French potentate Richelieu, on the death of Leclerc du Tremblay.
- December 21 – The full moon is in total eclipse from 1:12 to 2:47 UT, and the solstice occurs later in the day, at 16:05 UT.
- December 25 – Capture of Baghdad by the Ottomans under Sultan Murad IV.

=== Date unknown ===
- Shipwrecked English buccaneer Peter Wallace, called Balis by the Spanish, settles near and perhaps gives his name to the Belize River, the first known European settlement in Belize.
- The Peking Gazette makes an official switch in its production process of newspapers, from woodblock printing to movable type printing (private newspapers in Ming dynasty China were first mentioned in 1582).

=== January–March ===
- January 19 – Hämeenlinna (Swedish: Tavastehus) is granted privileges, after it separates from the Vanaja parish, as its own city in Tavastia.
- c. January – The first printing press in British North America is started in Cambridge, Massachusetts, by Stephen Daye.
- February 18 – In the course of the Eighty Years' War, a sea battle is fought in the English Channel off of the coast of Dunkirk between the navies of the United Provinces of the Netherlands, with 12 warships, and Spain, with 12 galleons and eight other ships. The Spanish are forced to flee after three of their ships are lost and 1,600 Spaniards killed or injured, while the Dutch sustain 1,700 casualties without the loss of a ship.
- March 3 – The early settlement of Taunton, Massachusetts, is incorporated as a town.
- March 13 – Harvard University is named for clergyman John Harvard.

=== April–June ===
- April 14 – In the Battle of Chemnitz, Swedish forces under Johan Banér inflict a crushing defeat on the army of the Holy Roman Empire, prolonging the Thirty Years' War and allowing the Swedes to occupy Pirna and advance into Bohemia.
- April 22 – Pope Urban VIII issues a papal bull prohibiting slavery in the New World colonies of Spain and Portugal, encompassing most of Latin America.
- April – Italian-born Cardinal Mazarin, apostolic nuncio to Paris and adviser to Cardinal Richelieu, is naturalized French by letters patent; in December, he leaves the service of Rome to enter that of King Louis XIII of France.
- April – Following the Battle of Chemnitz Swedish forces under command of Johan Banér invades Bohemia with great success
- May 2 – After a 40-day siege, the Dutch East India Company Army captures the Trincomalee Fort on the island of Ceylon (now Sri Lanka) from the Portuguese Empire.
- May 28 – King Charles I of England arrives with his army at Berwick-upon-Tweed as the first of the Bishops' Wars breaks out between the English Army and the Scottish Covenanters.
- June 18
  - The Treaty of Berwick is signed between Charles I and the Scots.
  - On the same day, the first battle of the Bishops' Wars is fought by Earl Marischal and the Marquess of Montrose when they lead a Covenanter army of 9,000 men past Muchalls Castle over the Causey Mounth to fight at the Bridge of Dee in Scotland.

=== July–September ===
- July 1 – Parthenius I becomes the new leader of the Eastern Orthodox Christian church as he is selected as Patriarch of Constantinople, succeeding Cyril II.
- July 16 – A revolt in France begins in Normandy with the assassination of tax collector Charles Le Poupinel while he is working in the town of Avranches. The rebellion is brutally crushed on November 30.
- August 22 – The British East India Company buys a strip of land from King Peda Venkata Raya of the Vijayanagara Empire for the construction of Fort St. George, the first settlement of British India, so founding modern-day Chennai, capital city of the Indian state of Tamil Nadu (celebrated as Madras Day).
- September 3 – The alliance of cantons in Switzerland known as the Three Leagues or Raetia agrees with Spain to bring Italy's Valtellina area back into the alliance, on the condition that the Catholic faith of the natives be respected.
- September 18 – Dutch Navy Admiral Maarten Tromp introduces the line of battle tactic in a battle in the English Channel against a much larger force of Spanish Navy ships, driving off 67 ships with his fleet of 29.

=== October–December ===
- October 31 – Naval Battle of the Downs: A Republic of the United Provinces fleet decisively defeats a Spanish fleet in English waters.
- November 30 – In Normandy, the revolt of the va-nu-pieds is crushed by the troops of French Army Colonel Jean de Gassion under orders of Armand Jean du Plessis, Cardinal Richelieu, with 300 of the rebels killed.
- December 4 – English astronomer Jeremiah Horrocks makes the first successful prediction and observation of a transit of Venus.

=== Date unknown ===
- The Casiquiare canal, a river forming a natural channel between the Amazon River and Orinoco River basins, is first encountered by Europeans, an expedition led by Pedro Teixeira and Cristóbal Diatristán de Acuña.
- French nobleman Jérôme le Royer de la Dauversière obtains the seigneurial title to the island of Montreal in New France (modern-day Quebec) in the name of the Société Notre-Dame de Montréal to establish a Roman Catholic mission to evangelize indigenous peoples.
- Russian Cossacks advance over the Urals to the Pacific, to Okhotsk.
- Sakoku, the isolationist foreign policy of Japan, comes fully into effect.
  - Dejima, an island trading post off Nagasaki, becomes the only official port of trade allowed for Europeans, with the multi-national United East Indies Company (Vereenigde Oostindische Compagnie) as the only European party officially allowed. Trading parties from China, India and other places are still officially allowed, though the VOC will become the usual broker for them.
  - Japanese wives and children of Dutch and British people from Hirado are sent to Batavia (Asian headquarters of the VOC, renamed Jakarta by the Japanese around three centuries later) on Dutch ships.
- The Treaty of Zuhab is signed between the Ottoman (Turkish) Empire and Safavid Persia, delineating the modern Turkey-Iran and Iraq-Iran border lines.

== Births ==
1630

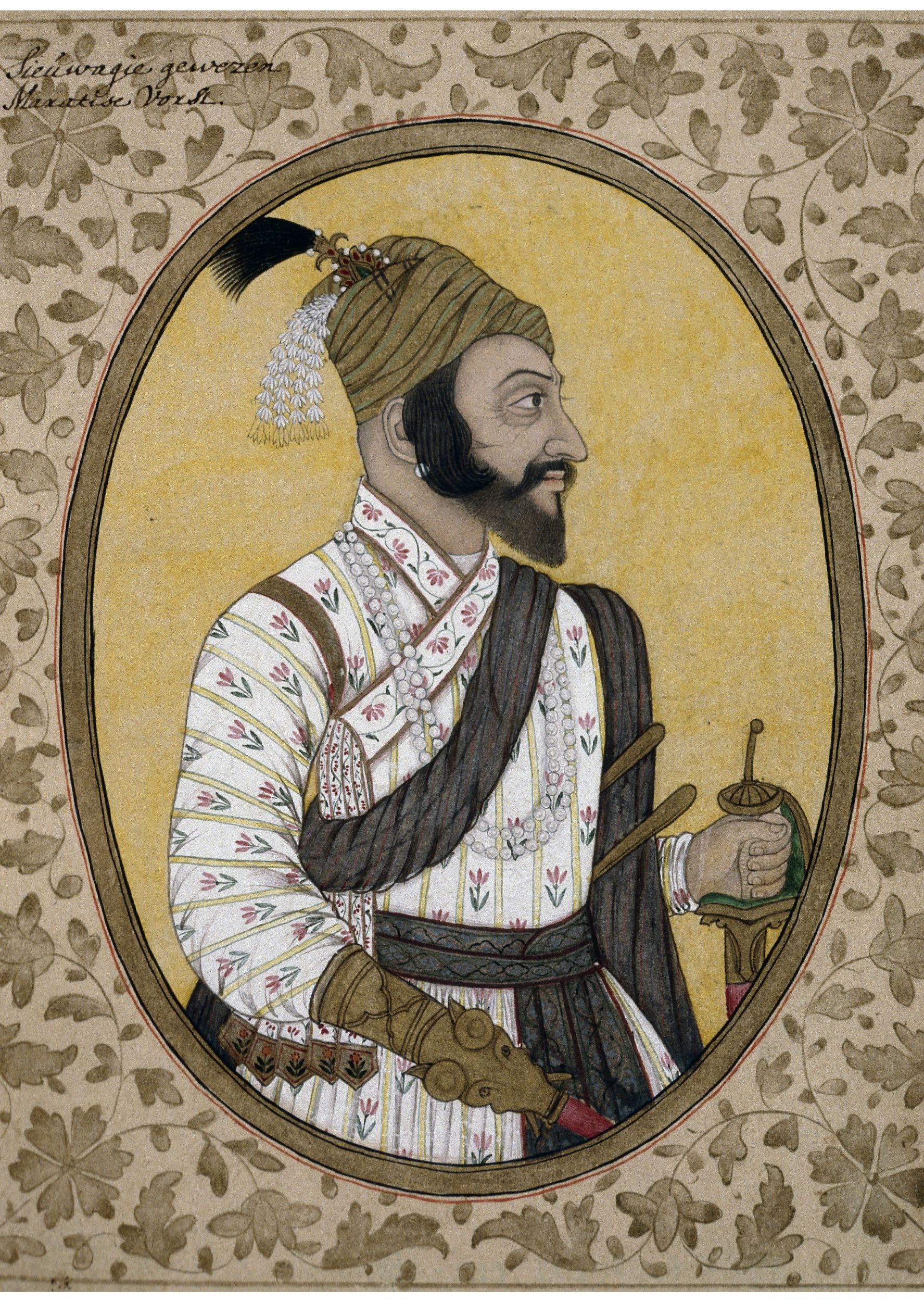
Shivaji I

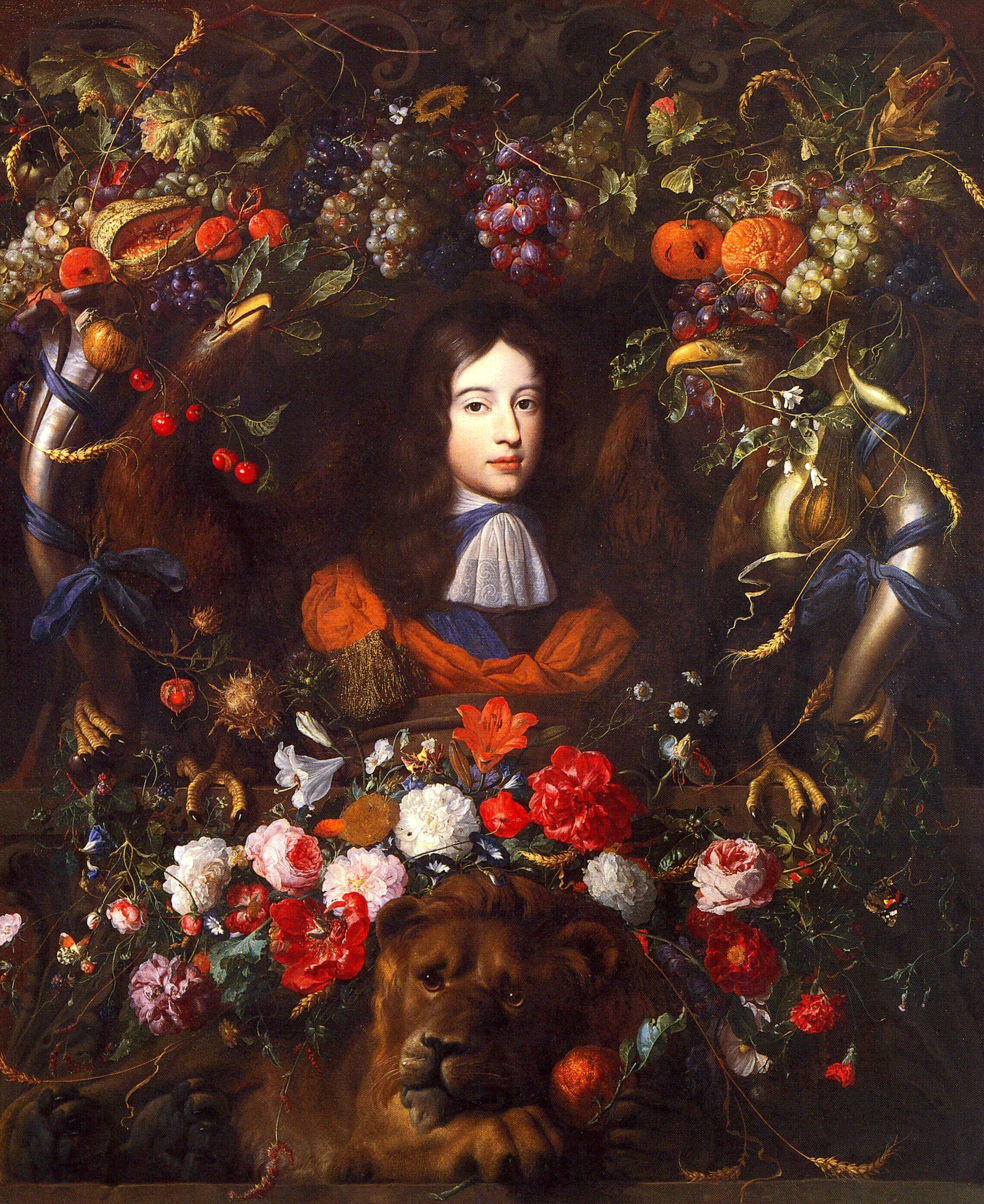
Jan Vermeer van Utrecht

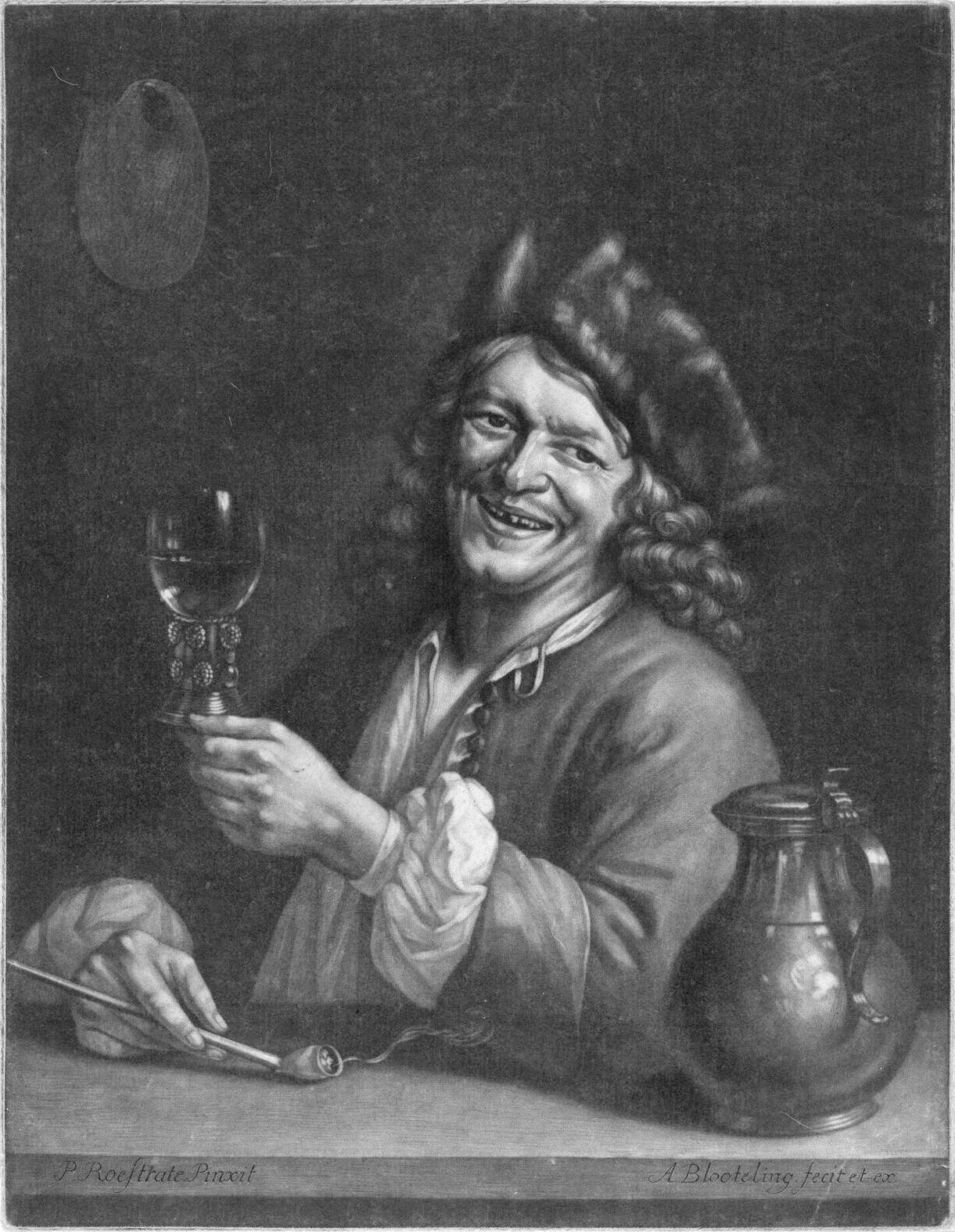
Pieter Gerritsz van Roestraten

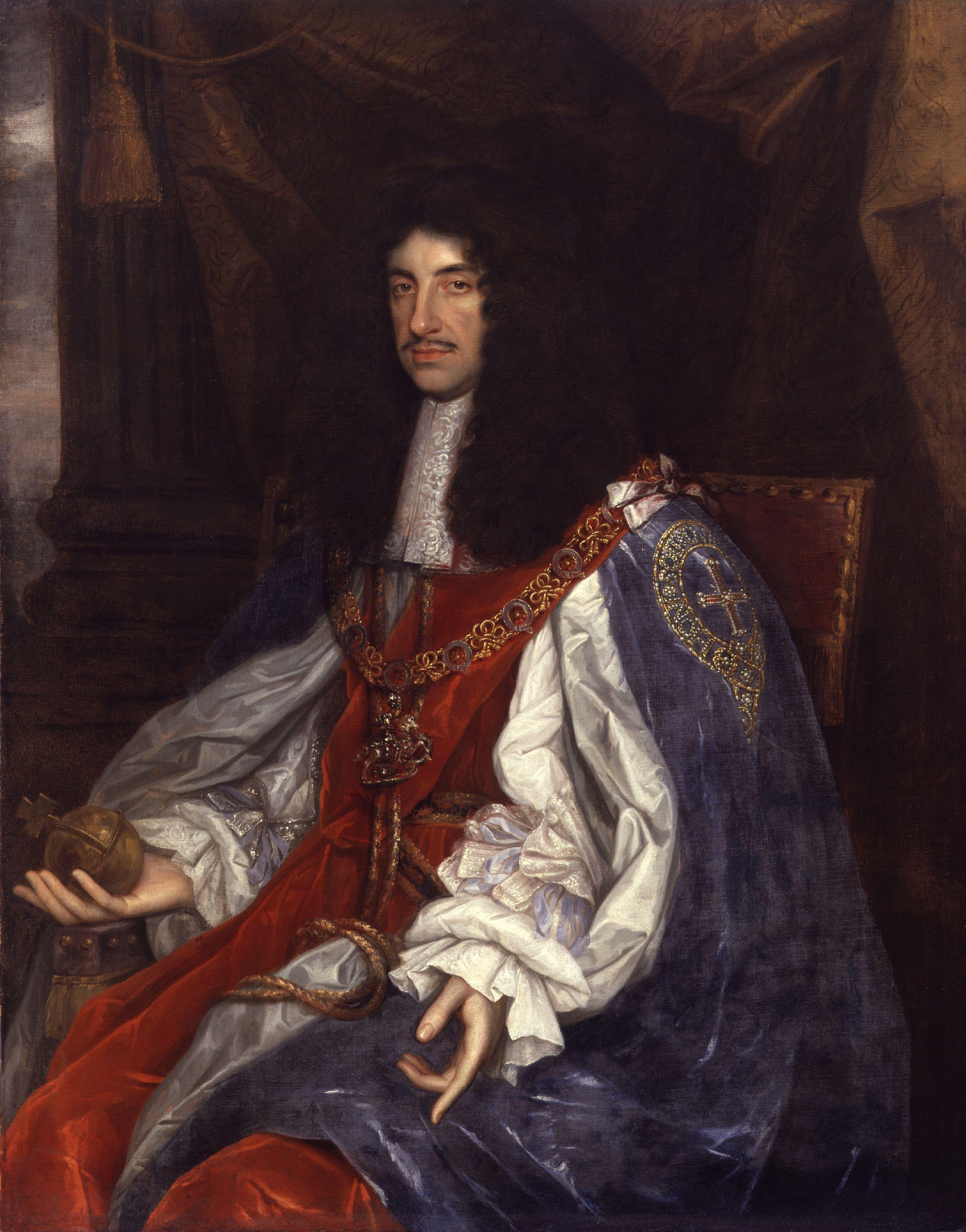
Charles II of England

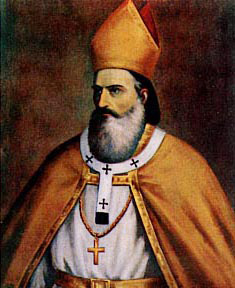
Estephan El Douaihy

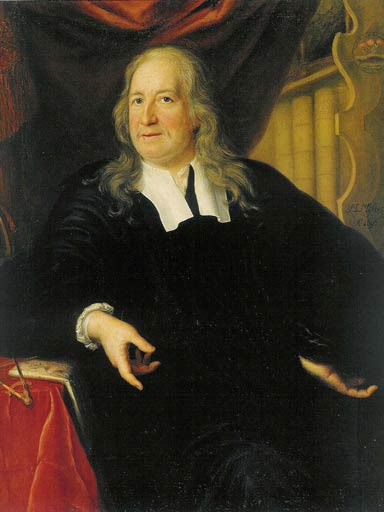
Olaus Rudbeck

=== January–March ===
- January 3 – Herbert Westfaling, English politician (d. 1705)
- January 5 – Manuel da Câmara III, Portuguese noble (d. 1673)
- January 10 – Edward Blaker, English politician (d. 1678)
- January 11
  - Charles Berkeley, 1st Earl of Falmouth, English noble, son of Charles Berkeley (d. 1665)
  - John Rogers, English-born President of Harvard (d. 1684)
- January 13 – Ōta Suketsugu, Japanese daimyō (d. 1685)
- January 16 – Guru Har Rai, Sikh guru (d. 1661)
- January 18 – Andrew Balfour, Scottish doctor (d. 1694)
- January 20 – Philip Florinus of Sulzbach, Austrian field marshal (d. 1703)
- January 25 – Louis VI, Landgrave of Hesse-Darmstadt (1661–1678) (d. 1678)
- January 27 – Job Adriaenszoon Berckheyde, Dutch painter (d. 1693)
- February 8 – Pierre Daniel Huet, French churchman and scholar (d. 1721)
- February 12 – Cornelis Bisschop, Dutch painter (d. 1674)
- February 16 – Jan Vermeer van Utrecht, Dutch painter (d. 1696)
- February 19 – Shivaji, Indian warrior king, founder of the Maratha Kingdom (d. 1680)
- February 20 (bapt.) – Josefa de Óbidos, Spanish artist (d. 1684)
- March 23 – Ignace Cotolendi, French bishop (d. 1662)
- March 24 – José Saenz d'Aguirre, Spanish Catholic cardinal (d. 1699)
- March 25 – Thierry Beschefer, French Jesuit missionary (d. 1711)
- March 28 – Silvestro Valiero, Doge of Venice (d. 1700)

=== April–June ===
- April 1 – Jacob Boreel, Dutch diplomat and politician (d. 1697)
- April 7 – Ulrik Christian Gyldenløve, commander-in-chief of the Danish army (d. 1658)
- April 16 – Lambert van Haven, Danish architect (d. 1695)
- April 21 – Pieter Gerritsz van Roestraten, Dutch painter (d. 1700)
- April 28 – Charles Cotton, English poet and writer (d. 1687)
- May 3
  - Thomas Rosewell, English minister (d. 1692)
  - Jacob von Sandrart, German engraver (d. 1708)
- May 4 – Hendrik Schoock, Dutch painter (d. 1707)
- May 6 – Johan Hadorph, Swedish director-general of the Central Board of National Antiquities (d. 1693)
- May 12 – Jean-Baptiste de Santeul, French writer (d. 1697)
- May 17 – John Howe, English Puritan theologian (d. 1705)
- May 29 – King Charles II of England, Scotland, and Ireland (d. 1685)
- June 1 – Carlo Barberini, Italian Catholic cardinal (d. 1704)
- June 4 – Jacques Rousseau, French painter (d. 1693)
- June 7 – John Talbot of Lacock, English politician and general (d. 1714)
- June 8 – Wolf Caspar von Klengel, German architect in Saxony (d. 1691)
- June 10 – Willem van Bemmel, Dutch Golden Age painter (d. 1708)
- June 24 – Henry Cavendish, 2nd Duke of Newcastle, English politician (d. 1691)

=== July–September ===
- July 22 – Madame de Brinvilliers, French murderer (d. 1676)
- August 1 – Thomas Clifford, 1st Baron Clifford of Chudleigh, English statesman (d. 1673)
- August 2 – Estephan El Douaihy, Lebanese Maronite Patriarch, historian (d. 1704)
- August 20 or August 27 – Maria van Oosterwijck, Dutch Golden Age painter (d. 1693)
- August 22 – Guy Aldonce de Durfort de Lorges, French noble, soldier (d. 1702)
- August 27 – Thomas Risley, English Presbyterian minister (d. 1716)
- September 6 – Thomas Hele, English politician (d. 1665)
- September 17 – Ranuccio II Farnese, Duke of Parma from 1646 until his death (d. 1694)
- September 25 – Pierre Cally, French philosopher and theologian (d. 1709)
- September 27 – Michael Willmann, German painter (d. 1706)

=== October–December ===
- October 2 – Henry Caesar, English politician (d. 1668)
- October 8 – Henry Bull, English politician (d. 1692)
- October 10 – Thomas Lawson, British botanist (d. 1691)
- October 14 – Sophia of Hanover, heir to the throne of Great Britain (d. 1714)
- October 18 – Henry Powle, English politician (d. 1692)
- October – John Tillotson, Archbishop of Canterbury (d. 1694)
- November 8 – Robert Bertie, 3rd Earl of Lindsey, English noble (d. 1701)
- November 12 – Catherine Duchemin, French flower and fruit painter (d. 1698)
- November 16 – Edvard Edvardsen, Norwegian historian and educator (d. 1695)
- November 17 – Hachisuka Mitsutaka, Japanese daimyō who ruled the Tokushima Domain (d. 1666)
- November 18 – Eleonora Gonzaga, Queen consort of Ferdinand III, Holy Roman Emperor (d. 1686)
- November 24 – Étienne Baluze, French scholar (d. 1718))
- November 27 – Sigismund Francis, Archduke of Austria, ruler of Further Austria including Tyrol (1662–1665) (d. 1665)
- December 5 – Sophie Augusta of Holstein-Gottorp, Regent of Anhalt-Zerbst (d. 1680)
- December 12 – Olaus Rudbeck, Swedish architect (d. 1702)
- December 14 – Horatio Townshend, 1st Viscount Townshend, English viscount (d. 1687)
- December 16 – Mary Somerset, Duchess of Beaufort, British botanist (d. 1715)
- December 28 – Ludolf Bakhuizen, Dutch painter (d. 1708)

=== Probable ===
- Stefano Erardi, Maltese painter (d. 1716)
- John Leslie, 1st Duke of Rothes, Scottish noble (d. 1681)
- Lucy Walter, Welsh mistress to King Charles II of England

1631

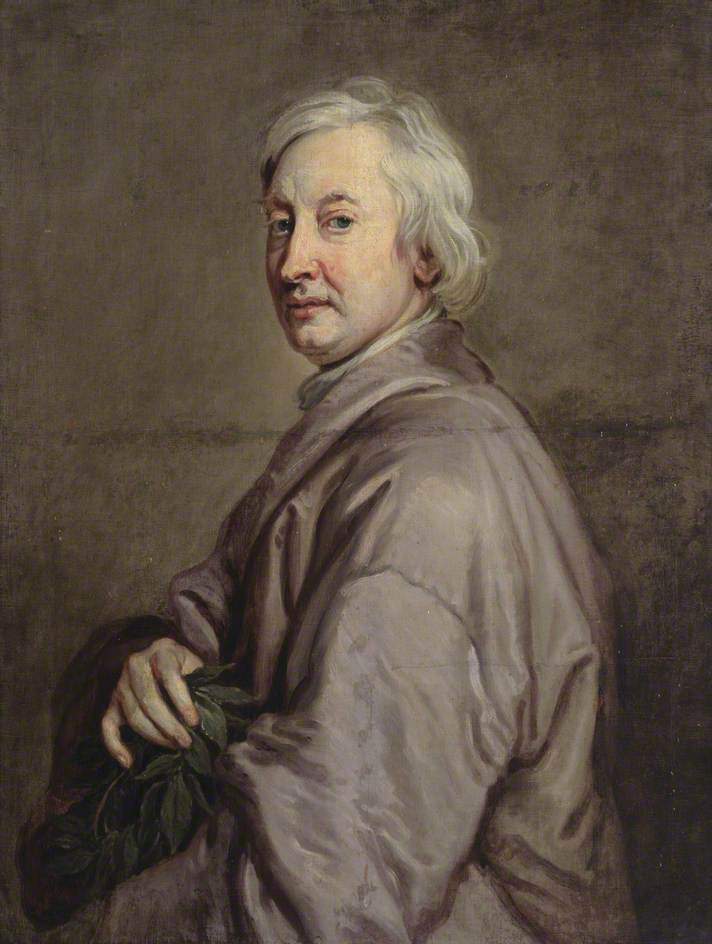
John Dryden

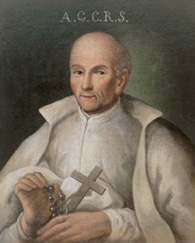
Stanislaus Papczyński

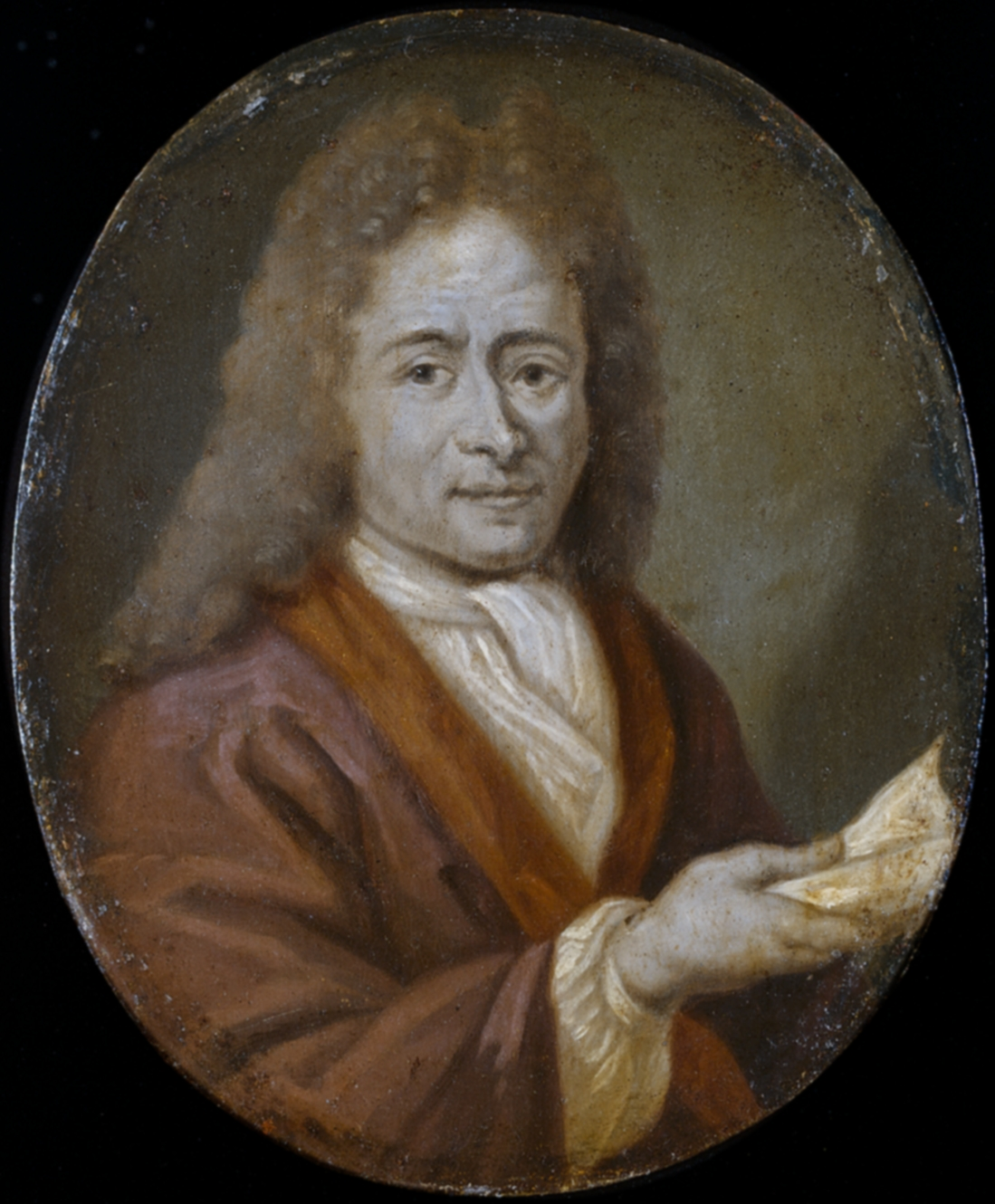
Christoffel Pierson

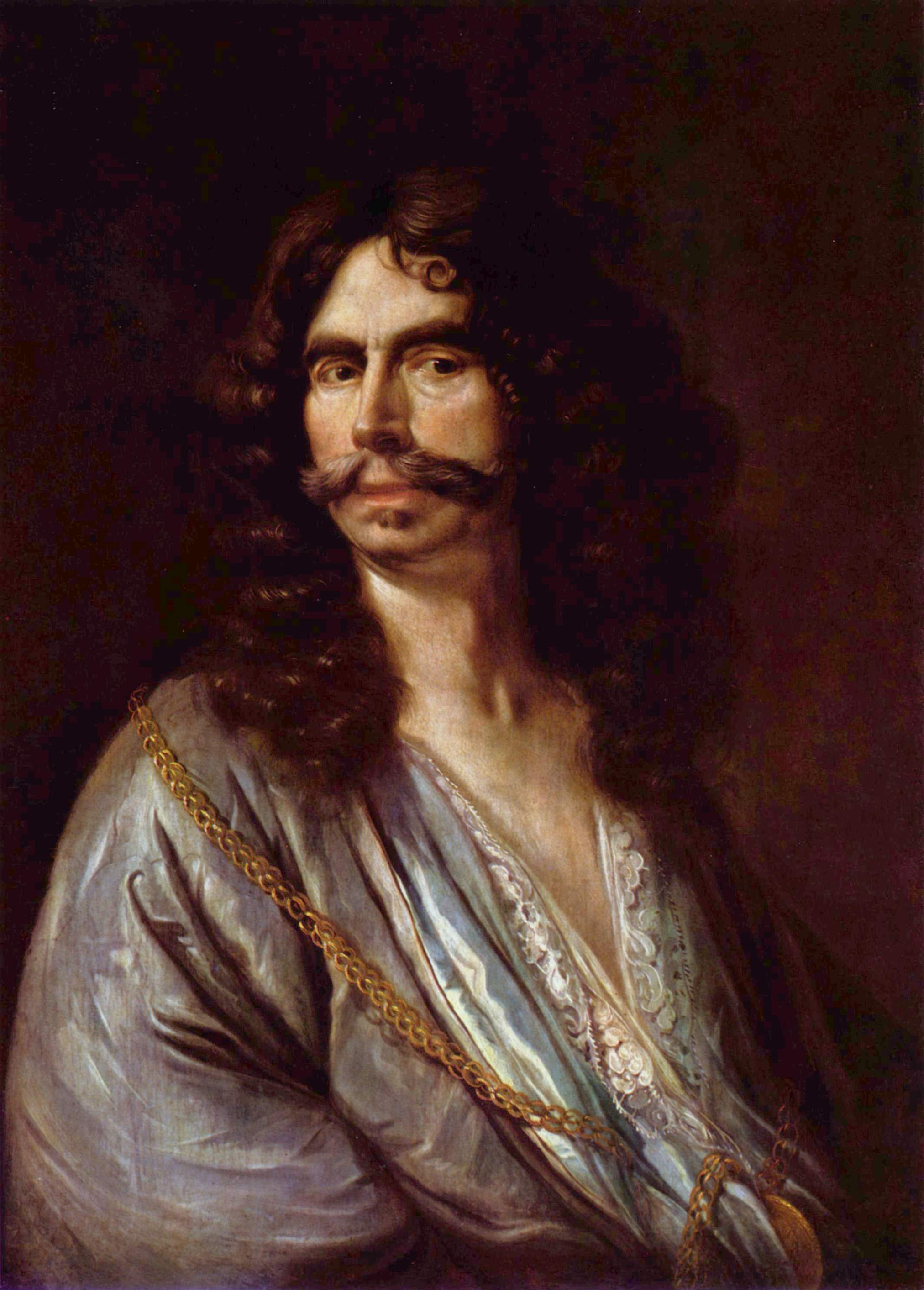
Johann Heinrich Roos

=== January–March ===
- January 1 or 1632 – Katherine Philips, Anglo-Welsh poet (d. 1664)
- January 2 – Anthonie van Borssom, Dutch painter (d. 1677)
- January 6 – Anne Hamilton, 3rd Duchess of Hamilton, Scottish peeress (d. 1716)
- January 12 – Hasanuddin of Gowa, 16th Ruler of The Sultanate of Gowa (d. 1670)
- January 23 – Vincent Houdry, French Jesuit preacher and writer on ascetics (d. 1729)
- February 6 – Edward Abney, English politician (d. 1727)
- February 10 – Louise of Anhalt-Dessau, Duchess suo jure of Oława and Wołów (1672–1680) (d. 1680)
- February 22 – Peder Syv, Danish historian (d. 1702)
- March 3 – Esaias Boursse, Dutch painter (d. 1672)
- March 9 – Claude-François Ménestrier, French heraldist, Jesuit, courtier (d. 1705)
- March 13 – Lodewijck Huygens, Dutch diplomat (d. 1699)
- March 16 – René Le Bossu, French critic (d. 1680)

=== April–June ===
- April 8 – Cornelis de Heem, Dutch painter (d. 1695)
- April 15
  - Piero de Bonzi, Italian Catholic cardinal (d. 1703)
  - Walter Vincent, English politician (d. 1680)
- April 21 – Francesco Maidalchini, Italian Catholic cardinal (d. 1700)
- April 29 – Joseph Bridger, Colonial Governor of Virginia (d. 1686)
- May 2 – John Murray, 1st Marquess of Atholl (d. 1703)
- May 4 – William Brereton, 3rd Baron Brereton, English politician (d. 1680)
- May 10 – Flavio Chigi, Italian Catholic cardinal (d. 1693)
- May 18 – Stanislaus Papczyński, Polish priest (d. 1701)
- May 19 – Christoffel Pierson, Dutch painter (d. 1714)
- May 28 – Louis André, French Jesuit priest, missionary and translator (d. 1715)
- May 29 – Robert Paston, 1st Earl of Yarmouth, English politician, earl (d. 1683)
- June 13 – Gilbert Hay, 11th Earl of Erroll, Scottish noble (d. 1674)
- June 17 – Gauharara Begum, Mughal noblewoman (d. 1706)
- June 22 – Francis Rombouts, Dutch Mayor of New York City (d. 1691)
- June 25 – António das Chagas, Portuguese Franciscan friar and ascetical writer (d. 1682)
- June 26 – Vincenzo Albrici, Italian composer (d. 1695)

=== July–September ===
- July 4 – John Roettiers, English engraver (d. 1703)
- July 15
  - Richard Cumberland, English philosopher (d. 1718)
  - Jens Juel, Danish diplomat (d. 1700)
- August 5 – Adam Adamandy Kochański, Polish mathematician (d. 1700)
- August 7 – Nicholas Tufton, 3rd Earl of Thanet, England (d. 1679)
- August 19
  - Maffeo Barberini, Prince of Palestrina (d. 1685)
  - John Dryden, English writer (d. 1700)
- August 24 – Philip Henry, English minister (d. 1696)
- August 29 – Henry Noris, Italian Catholic cardinal (d. 1704)
- September 1 – Anne Crawford-Lindsay, Scottish noblewoman (d. 1689)
- September 6 – Charles Porter, English-born judge (d. 1696)
- September 29
  - Richard Edlin, English astrologer (d. 1677)
  - Johann Heinrich Roos, Dutch painter (d. 1685)

=== October–December ===
- October 1
  - Toussaint de Forbin-Janson, French Catholic cardinal and Bishop of Beauvais (d. 1713)
  - Eugene Maximilian, Prince of Hornes (d. 1709)
- October 3 – Sebastian Anton Scherer, German organist and composer (d. 1712)
- October 6 – Emmanuel, Prince of Anhalt-Köthen, German prince of the House of Ascania (d. 1670)
- October 12 – George Saunderson, 5th Viscount Castleton, English Member of Parliament (d. 1714)
- October 13 – Richard Hampden, English politician (d. 1695)
- October 18
  - Heinrich Müller, German theologian and writer (d. 1675)
  - Michael Wigglesworth, American Puritan minister (d. 1705)
- October 22 – Gilles Boileau, French translator (d. 1669)
- October 26 – Leopold Karl von Kollonitsch, Hungarian Catholic cardinal (d. 1707)
- October 30 – Pierre Beauchamp, French choreographer, dancer and composer (d. 1705)
- November 4 – Mary, Princess Royal and Princess of Orange (d. 1660)
- November 10 – Daniel Harvey, English merchant and politician (d. 1672)
- November 17 – Marco d'Aviano, Italian Capuchin friar (d. 1699)
- November 21 – Catharina Questiers, Dutch poet (d. 1669)
- November 28 – Abraham Brueghel, Flemish Baroque painter (d. 1690)
- December 14 – Anne Conway, English philosopher (d. 1679)
- December 24
  - Bernhard Gustav of Baden-Durlach, Swedish general, Prince-Abbot of Fulda and Kempten, and cardinal (d. 1677)
  - Gabrielle Suchon, French Catholic moral philosopher, feminist (d. 1703)

=== Date unknown ===
- Joaquim Juncosa, Carthusian monk and Baroque painter (d. 1708)
- Klara Izabella Pacowa, politically active Polish court official (d. 1685)
- William Stoughton, American judge at the Salem witch trials (d. 1701)

1632

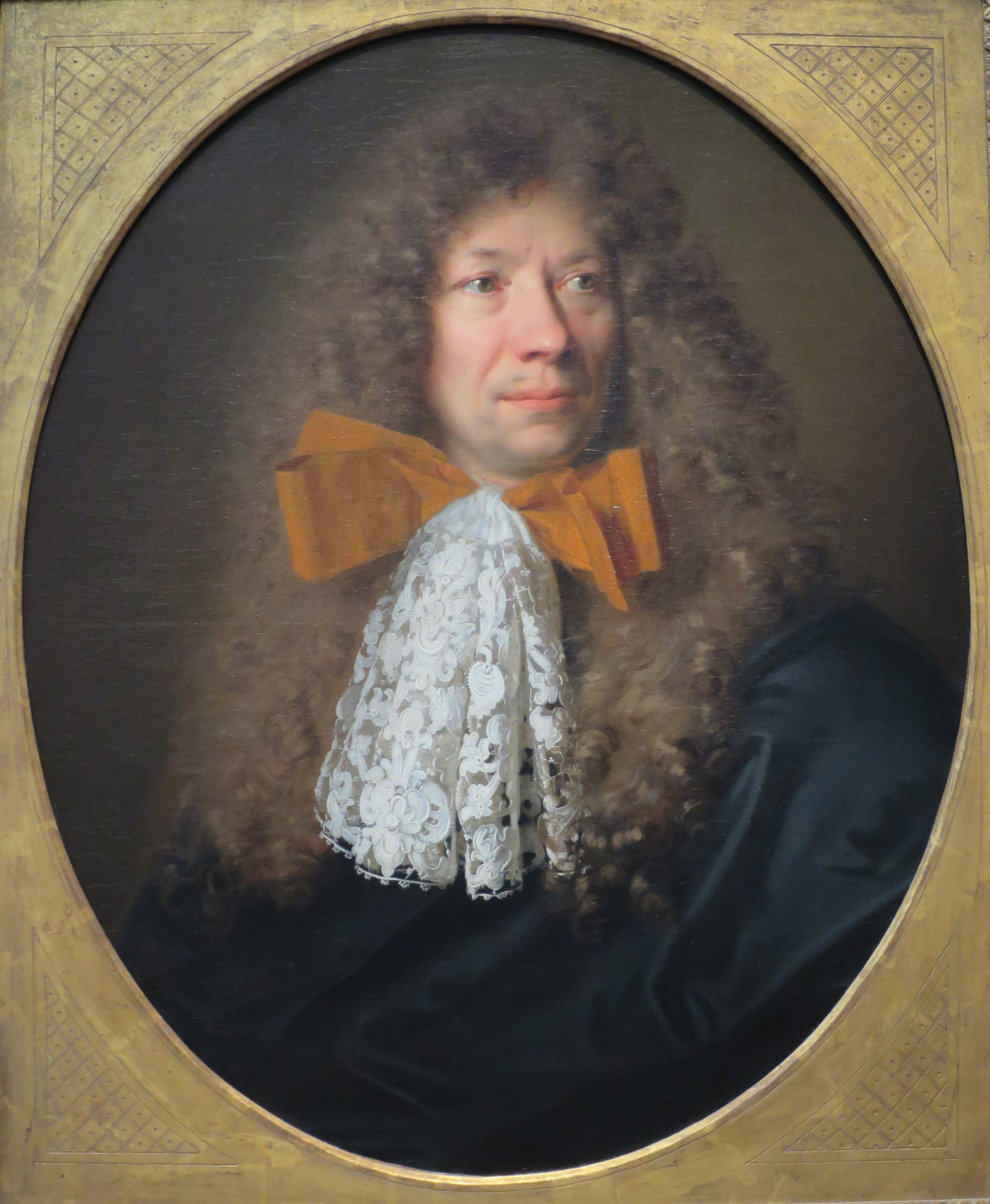
Adam Frans van der Meulen

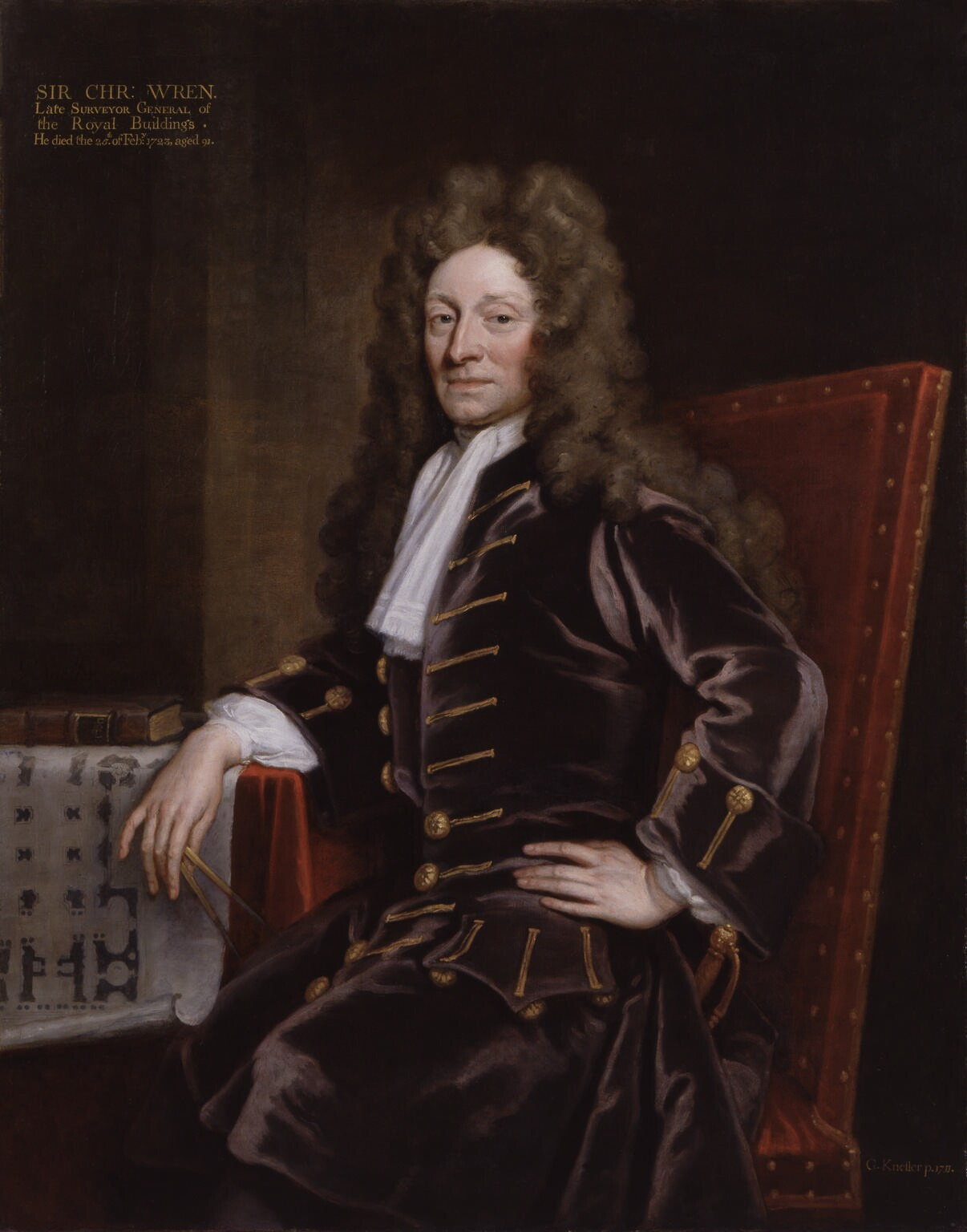
Christopher Wren

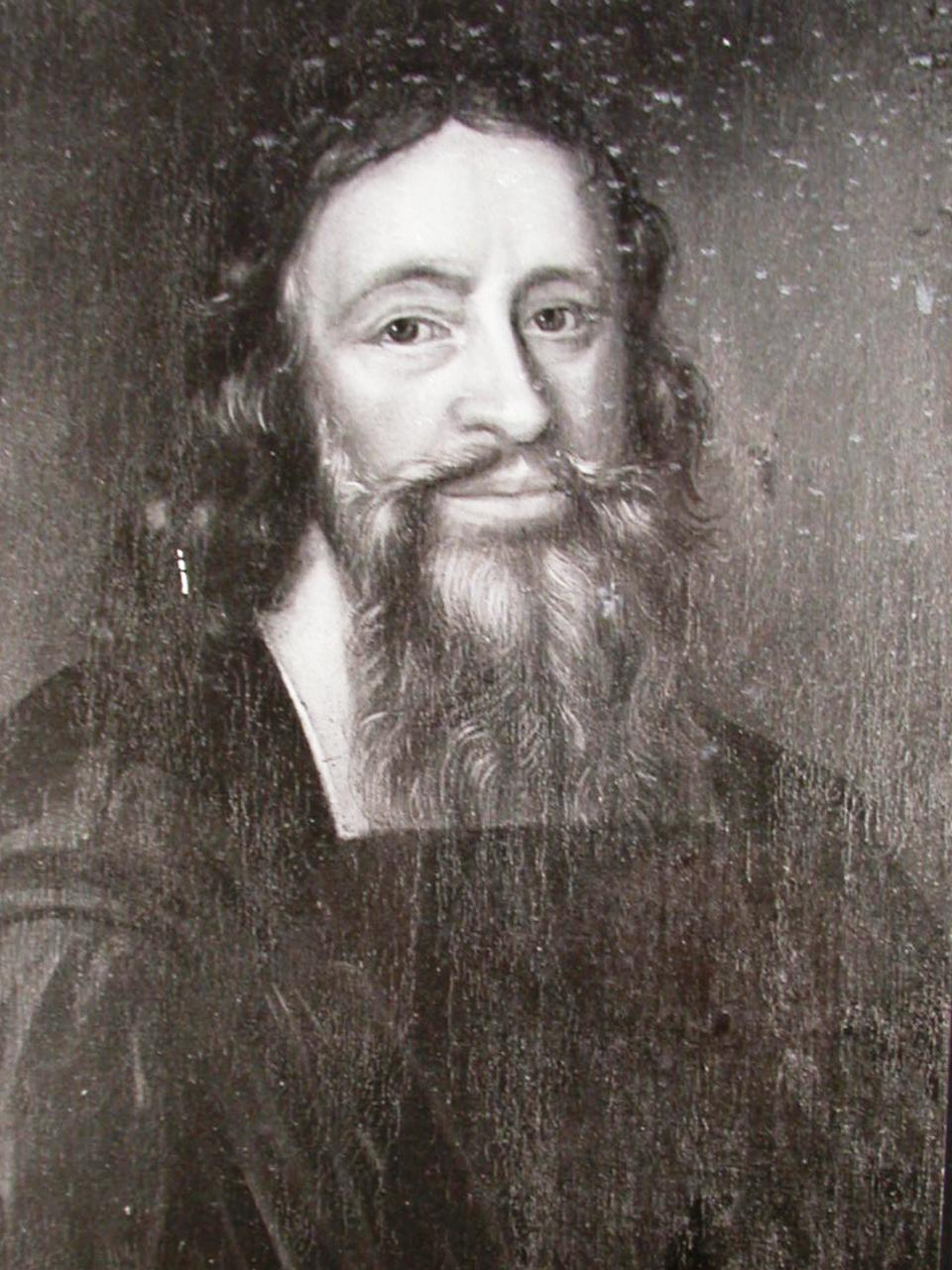
Erik Benzelius the Elder

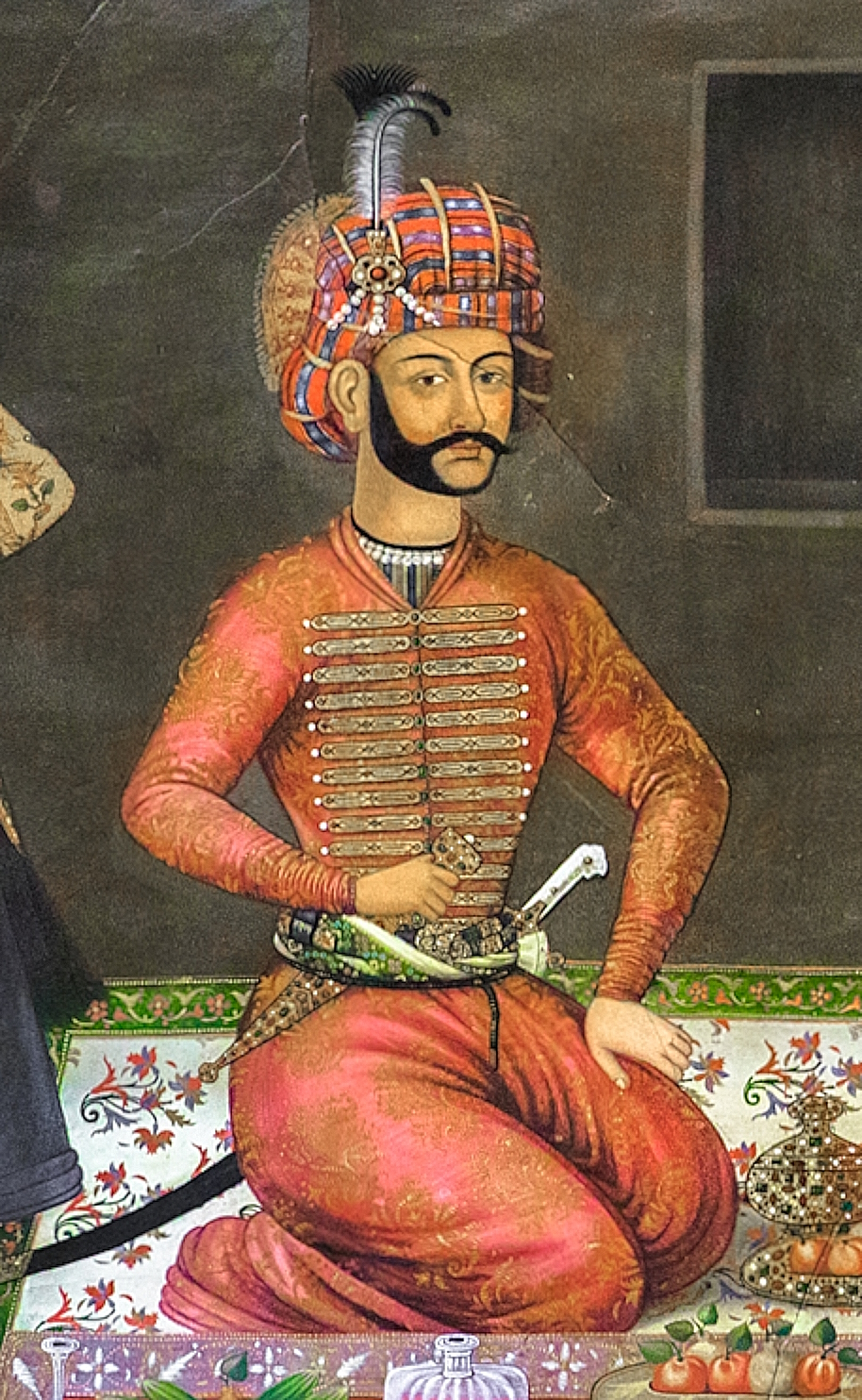
Abbas II of Persia

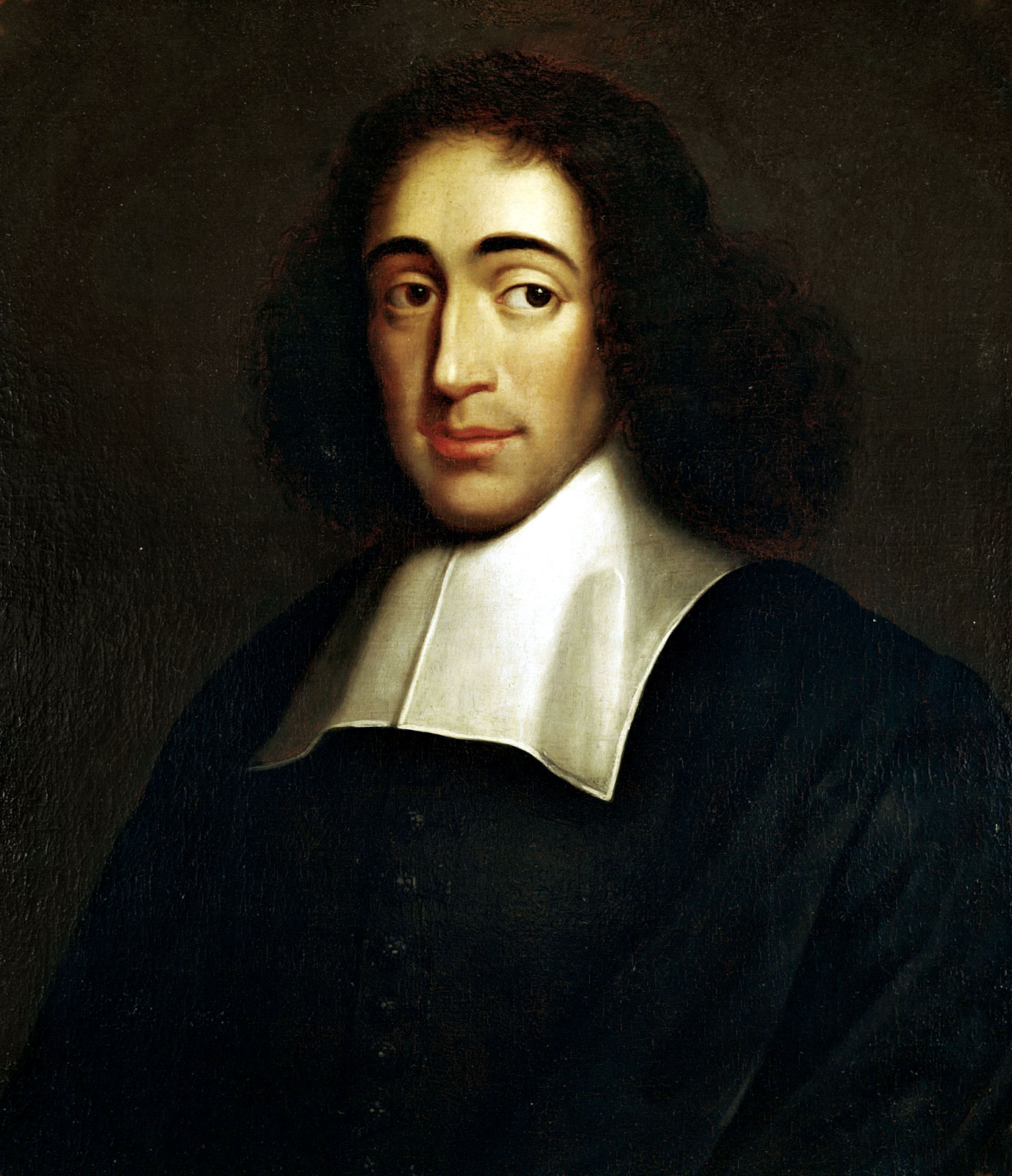
Baruch Spinoza

=== January–March ===
- January 1 – Claude de Choiseul-Francières, Marshal of France (d. 1711)
- January 3 – Sir John Duke, 2nd Baronet, Member of Parliament of England (d. 1705)
- January 8 – Samuel von Pufendorf, German jurist (d. 1694)
- January 11
  - Adam Frans van der Meulen, Flemish Baroque painter specialising in battle scenes (d. 1690)
  - John Platt, American settler (d. 1705)
- January 14 – Gustavus Adolphus of the Palatinate, German noble (d. 1641)
- January 26 – Marie Charlotte de la Trémoille, French noble (d. 1682)
- January 29
  - Elsa Elisabeth Brahe, Swedish countess and duchess (d. 1689)
  - Johann Georg Graevius, German classical scholar and critic (d. 1703)
- February 11 – Francisco de Aguiar y Seijas, Spanish cleric and bishop (d. 1698)
- February 12 – Charles Aubert de La Chesnaye, French businessman active in Canada (d. 1702)
- February 18 – Giovanni Battista Vitali, Italian composer (d. 1692)
- February 20 – Thomas Osborne, 1st Duke of Leeds, English statesman (d. 1712)
- February 24 – Antoine Benoist, French painter (d. 1717)
- February 29 – Juriaen van Streeck, Dutch painter (d. 1687)
- March 8 – Davide Cocco Palmieri, Italian Catholic bishop (d. 1711)
- March 13 – John Houblon, first Governor of the Bank of England (1694-1697) (d. 1712)
- March 21 – Sir John Hotham, 2nd Baronet, Member of the House of Commons of England (d. 1689)
- March 25 – John Temple, Irish politician (d. 1705)
- March 27 – Gustav Adolph, Count of Nassau-Saarbrücken and general sergeant of the Holy Roman Empire at the Rhine (d. 1677)
- March 30 – John Proctor, Massachusetts farmer, tavern keeper (d. 1692)

=== April–June ===
- April 2 – Georg Caspar Wecker, German composer (d. 1695)
- April 6
  - Maria Leopoldine of Austria, Holy Roman Empress (d. 1649)
  - Simon Philip, Count of Lippe-Detmold (1636–1650) (d. 1650)
- April 12 – Henry Chauncy, British antiquarian (d. 1719)
- April 19 – Charles Cornwallis, 2nd Baron Cornwallis, Member of Parliament (d. 1673)
- April 21 – Sir Hugh Smith, 1st Baronet, English Member of Parliament (d. 1680)
- May 1 – Friedrich Spanheim the Younger, Calvinist theologian (d. 1701)
- May 3 – Catherine of St. Augustine, French nun, nurse of New France (d. 1668)
- May 8 – Heino Heinrich Graf von Flemming, German field marshal, Governor of Berlin (d. 1706)
- May 13 – Nicolas Pitau, Flemish-born French engraver (d. 1671)
- May 15 – Adolf William, Duke of Saxe-Eisenach (d. 1668)
- May 16 – Jeremias van Rensselaer, Dutch colonial governor (d. 1674)
- May 17 – John Hall, English politician (d. 1711)
- May 21 – Feodosia Morozova, Russian religious dissident martyr (d. 1675)
- June 10 – Esprit Fléchier, French writer and Bishop of Nîmes (d. 1710)
- June 14 – Jean Gallois, French scholar and abbé (d. 1707)
- June 25 – Girolamo Corner, Venetian statesman and military commander (d. 1690)

=== July–September ===
- July 3 – Tylman van Gameren, Dutch architect (d. 1706)
- July 15 – Thomas Seamer, founding settler of Norwalk, Connecticut (d. 1712)
- July 21 – Sir Hugh Cholmeley, 4th Baronet, English politician (d. 1689)
- August 2 – Kaspar von Stieler, German soldier-poet (d. 1707)
- August 13 – François-Séraphin Régnier-Desmarais, French diplomat and writer (d. 1713)
- August 15 – Valentine Hollingsworth, English colonist of Delaware (d. 1710)
- August 20 – Louis Bourdaloue, French Jesuit and preacher (d. 1704)
- August 27 – Johannetta of Sayn-Wittgenstein, German noblewoman member of the House of Sponheim (d. 1701)
- August 29 – John Locke, English philosopher (d. 1704)
- September 3 – John Tregonwell, English Member of Parliament (d. 1682)
- September 14 – Francis Hyacinth, Duke of Savoy (d. 1638)
- September 15 – François Adhémar de Monteil, Comte de Grignan, French aristocrat (d. 1714)
- September 23 – Agatha Christine of Hanau-Lichtenberg, German noblewoman (d. 1681)
- September 29 – George III, Landgrave of Hesse-Itter (1661–1676) (d. 1676)

=== October–December ===
- October 1 – George Durant, attorney in the Province of Carolina (d. 1692)
- October 18 – Thomas Proby, English politician (d. 1689)
- October 20
  - Pedro Antonio Fernández de Castro, 10th Count of Lemos, Viceroy of Peru (d. 1672)
  - Edward Hungerford, English politician (d. 1711)
  - Sir Christopher Wren, English architect, astronomer and mathematician (d. 1723)
- October 21 – William Hedges, first governor of the East India Company (d. 1701)
- October 24 – Anton van Leeuwenhoek, Dutch scientist (d. 1723)
- October 25
  - Charles Dormer, 2nd Earl of Carnarvon, English noble (d. 1709)
  - Francis Mezger, Austrian Benedictine academic and writer (d. 1701)
- October 28 – Antoine Massoulié, French Dominican theologian (d. 1706)
- October 29 – Enno Louis, Prince of East Frisia, Frisian prince (d. 1660)
- October 31 (bapt.) – Johannes Vermeer, Dutch painter (d. 1675)
- November 16 – Sir Anthony Cope, 4th Baronet, English Member of Parliament (d. 1675)
- November 23 – Jean Mabillon, French Benedictine monk and scholar of the Congregation of Saint Maur (d. 1707)
- November 24 – Baruch Spinoza, Dutch philosopher (d. 1677)
- November 26 – Philipp Ludwig III, Count of Hanau-Münzenberg (1638–1641) (d. 1641)
- November 28 – Jean-Baptiste Lully, Italian-born French composer (d. 1687)
- December 9 – William Clayton, acting Governor of the Pennsylvania Colony (1684–1685) (d. 1689)
- December 16 – Erik Benzelius the Elder, Swedish theologian (d. 1709)
- December 17 – Anthony Wood, English antiquarian (d. 1695)
- December 24
  - Matthias Petersen, sea captain and whaler from the North Frisian island of Föhr (d. 1706)
  - Ōkubo Tadatomo, Japanese daimyō (d. 1712)
- December 31 – Abbas II of Persia, Shah of Iran (d. 1666)

=== Date unknown ===
- Bárbara Coronel, Spanish actress (d. 1691)
- Anne de La Grange-Trianon, French courtier (d. 1707)
- Louise Boyer, French duchess and courtier (d. 1697)

1633

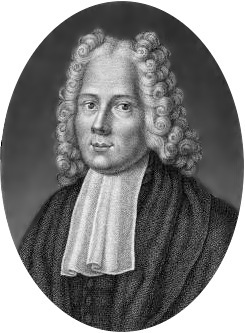
Alessandro Marchetti

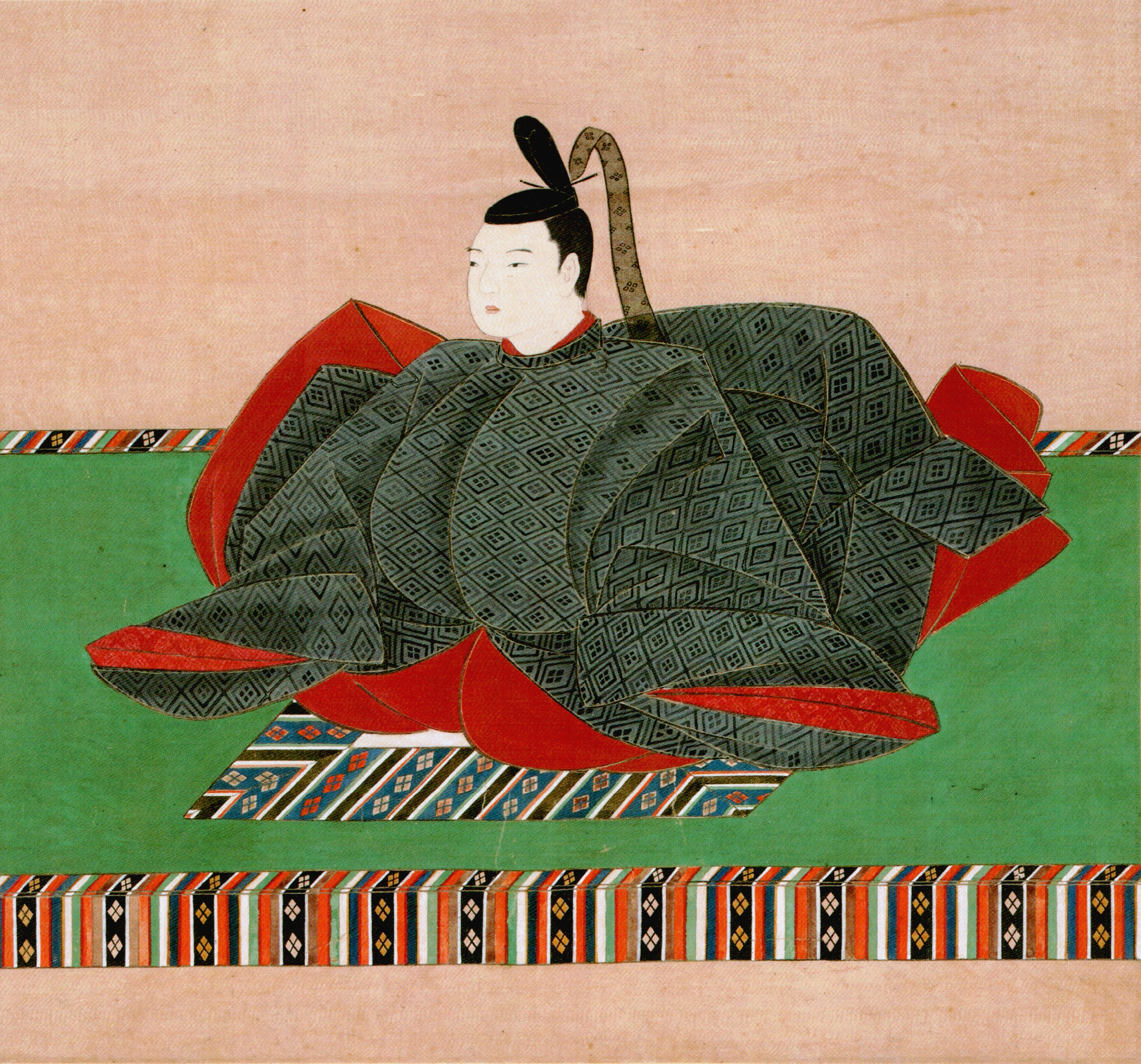
Emperor Go-Kōmyō

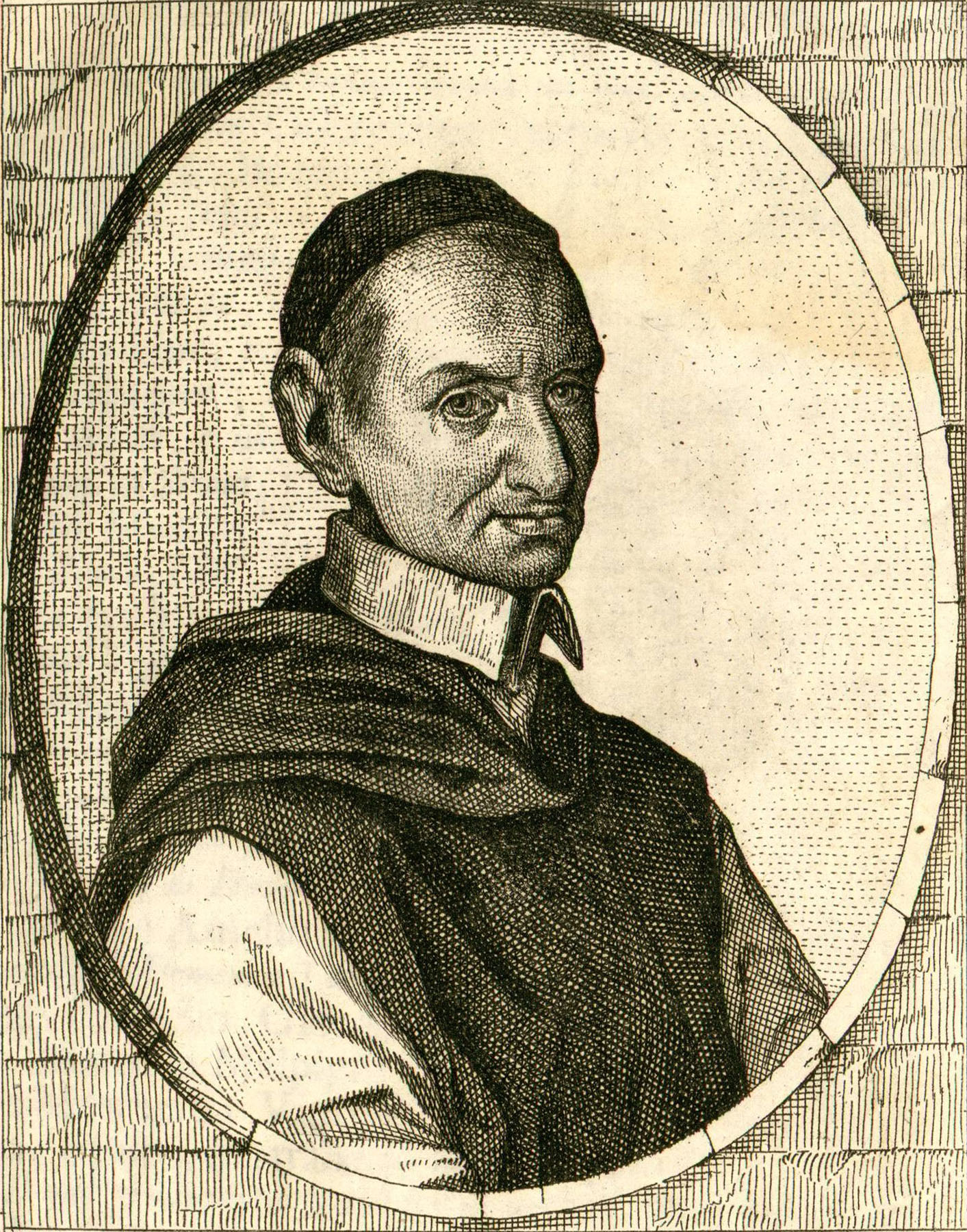
Paolo Boccone

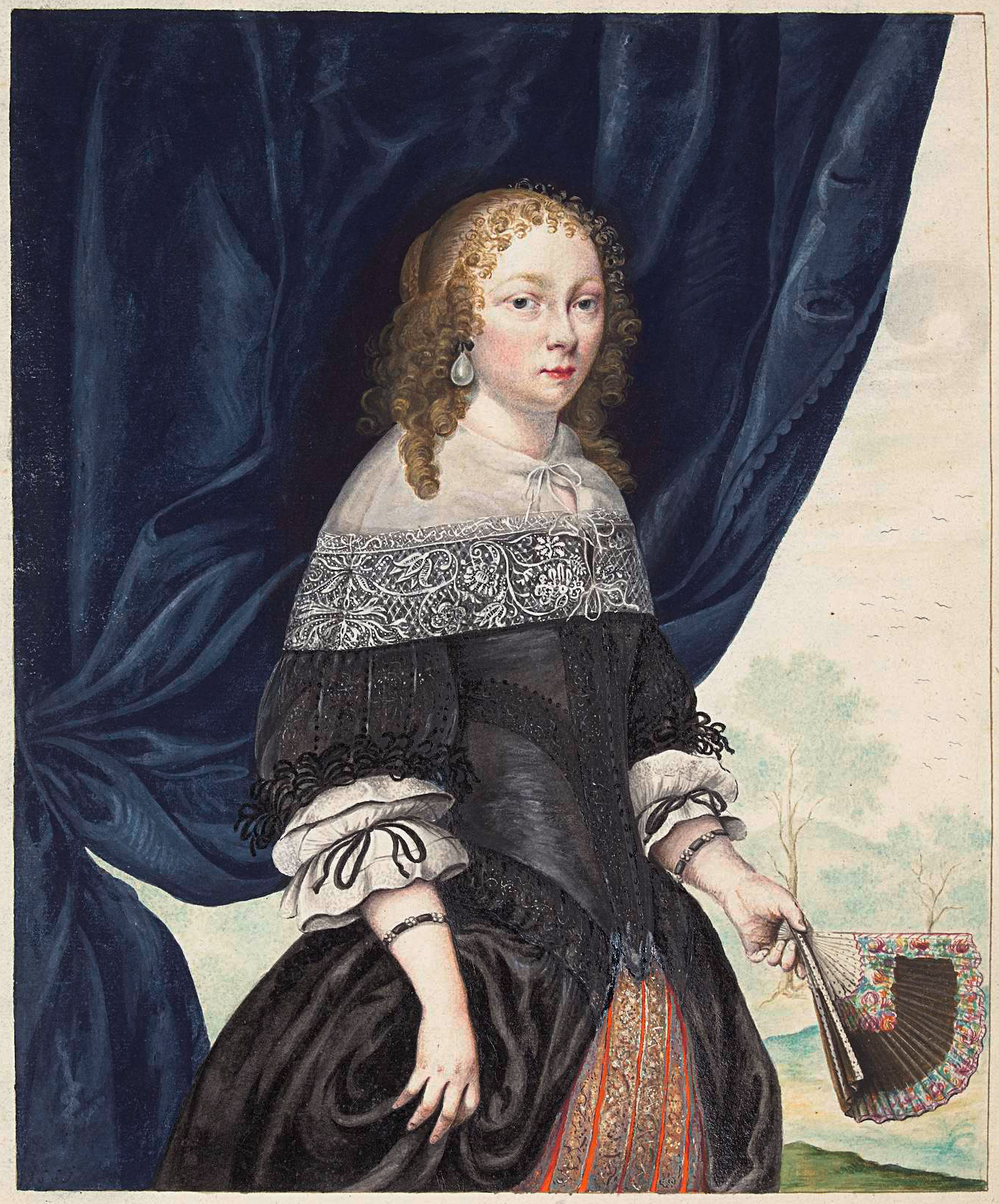
Gesina ter Borch

=== January–March ===
- January 20 – Edmund Maine, English Member of Parliament (d. 1711)
- January 31 – Nathaniel Crew, 3rd Baron Crew of England (d. 1721)
- February 20 – Jan de Baen, Dutch portrait painter (d. 1702)
- February 23
  - Charles Patin, French physician (d. 1693)
  - Samuel Pepys, English civil servant and diarist (d. 1703)
- February 26 – Gustav Adolph, Duke of Mecklenburg-Güstrow and last Administrator of Ratzeburg (d. 1695)
- March 1 – Yi Sŏu, Korean scholar (d. 1709)
- March 7 – Giovanni Battista Volpati, Italian painter (d. 1706)
- March 12 – Sir John Evelyn, 1st Baronet, of Godstone, English noble (d. 1671)
- March 17 – Alessandro Marchetti, Italian mathematician (d. 1714)
- March 25 – Samuel Whiting, Jr., American clergyman (d. 1713)
- March 26 – Mary Beale, British artist (d. 1699)
- March 30
  - Miron Costin, Moldavian (Romanian) political figure and chronicler (d. 1691)
  - Frederick II, Landgrave of Hesse-Homburg, German general, Landgraf of Hesse-Homburg (d. 1708)

=== April–June ===
- April 16 – Salomon Jansz van den Tempel, Dutch shipbuilder (d. 1673)
- April 19
  - Willem Drost, Dutch painter (d. 1659)
  - Abraham Hill, British merchant (d. 1721)
- April 20 – Emperor Go-Kōmyō of Japan (d. 1654)
- April 24
  - Paolo Boccone, Italian botanist from Sicily (d. 1704)
  - Gilbert Holles, 3rd Earl of Clare, English politician and earl (d. 1689)
- May 1
  - Walter Chetwynd, English antiquary, politician (d. 1693)
  - Sébastien Le Prestre de Vauban, French noble and military engineer noted for designing fortifications (d. 1707)
- May 21 – Joseph Chabanceau de La Barre, French composer (d. 1678)
- June 1 – Geminiano Montanari, Italian astronomer (d. 1687)
- June 16 – Jean de Thévenot, French traveler and scientist (d. 1667)
- June 19 – Philipp van Limborch, Dutch Protestant theologian (d. 1712)
- June 27 – Auguste of Schleswig-Holstein-Sonderburg-Glücksburg, German noble (d. 1701)

=== July–September ===
- July 1 – Johann Heinrich Heidegger, Swiss theologian (d. 1698)
- July 6 – Sir Henry Yelverton, 2nd Baronet, English Member of Parliament (d. 1670)
- July 12 – Thofania d'Adamo, Italian poisoner
- July 25 – Joseph Williamson, English politician (d. 1701)
- September 6 – Sebastian Knüpfer, German composer (d. 1676)
- September 7 – Catharina Regina von Greiffenberg, Austrian writer and noble (d. 1695)
- September 8 – Ferdinand IV, King of the Romans (d. 1654)
- September 15 – William Croone, English physician and one of the original Fellows of the Royal Society (d. 1684)

=== October–December ===
- October 4
  - Anthony Ulrich, Duke of Brunswick-Wolfenbüttel (d. 1714)
  - Bernardino Ramazzini, Italian physician (d. 1714)
- October 14 – King James II of England (d. 1701)
- October 15 – Giordano Vitale, Italian mathematician (d. 1711)
- October 19 – Benedetto Gennari II, Italian painter (d. 1715)
- October 25 – Esaias Fleischer, Danish priest (d. 1697)
- October 29 – Antonio Magliabechi, Italian librarian (d. 1714)
- November 2 – George Gordon, 15th Earl of Sutherland, Scottish noble (d. 1703)
- November 10 – Thomas Jermyn, 2nd Baron Jermyn, Governor of Jersey (d. 1703)
- November 11 – George Savile, 1st Marquess of Halifax, English writer and statesman (d. 1695)
- November 15 – Gesina ter Borch, Dutch Golden Age painter (d. 1690)
- November 20 – Étienne de Carheil, French Jesuit priest, missionary to the Iroquois and Huron Indians (d. 1726)
- November 26 – Johann Christoph Wagenseil, German Christian Hebraist (d. 1705)
- December 18 – Willem van de Velde the Younger, Dutch painter (d. 1707)
- December 27 – Jean de Lamberville, French missionary (d. 1714)
- December 29
  - Jean Le Pelletier, French polygraph and alchemist (d. 1711)
  - Johannes Zollikofer, Swiss vicar (d. 1692)

=== Date unknown ===
- Sir Edward Seymour, 4th Baronet, English politician (d. 1708)

1634

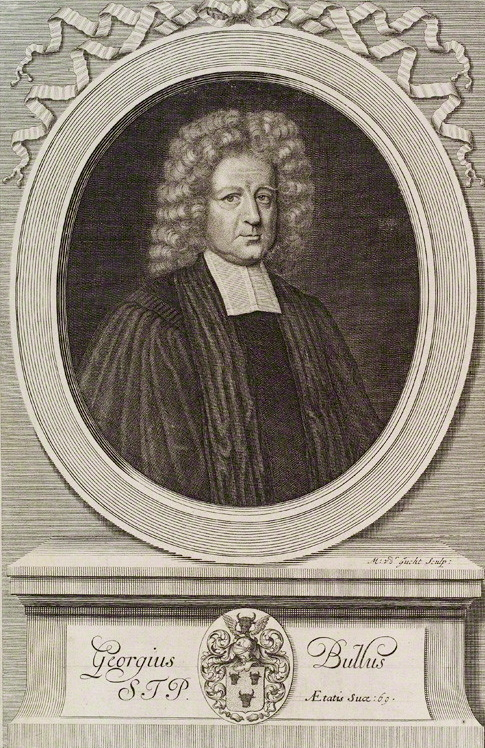
George Bull

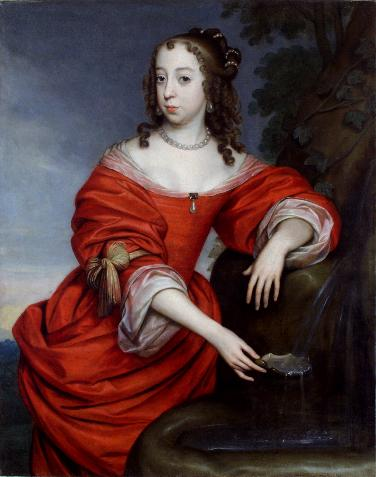
Countess Albertine Agnes of Nassau

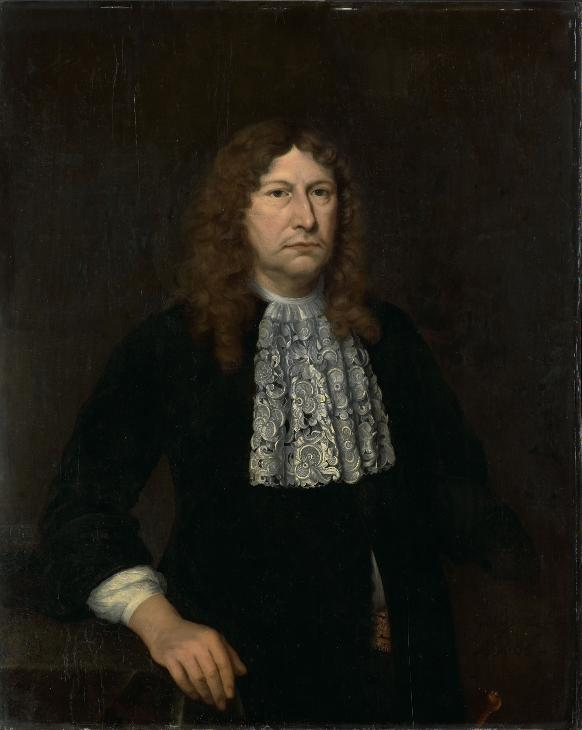
Johannes Camphuys

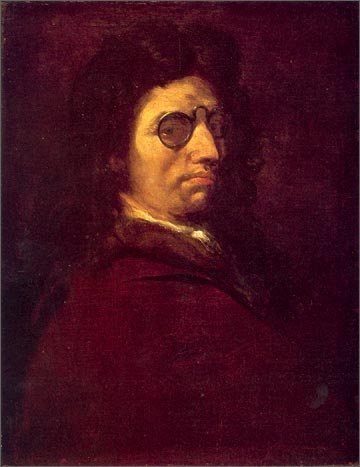
Luca Giordano

=== January–March ===
- January 1 – Fleetwood Sheppard, English poet (d. 1698)
- January 7
  - Sophia Eleonore of Hesse-Darmstadt, Landgravine consort of Hesse-Homburg (d. 1663)
  - Adam Krieger, German composer (d. 1666)
  - Katarzyna Sobieska, Polish noble (d. 1694)
- January 16 – Dorothe Engelbretsdotter, Norway's first professional female author (d. 1716)
- January 25 – Gaspar Fagel, Dutch statesman (d. 1688)
- January 30 – Johann Hugo von Orsbeck, Archbishop-Elector of Trier (d. 1711)
- February 2 – Alfonso IV d'Este, Duke of Modena, Italian noble (d. 1662)
- February 5 – Maria Antonia Scalera Stellini, Italian poet (d. 1704)
- February 6 – George Christian, Prince of East Frisia, prince of Ostfriesland (d. 1665)
- February 7 – Robert Robartes, Viscount Bodmin, English diplomat and politician (d. 1682)
- February 8 – Teodósio, Prince of Brazil, Brazilian prince (d. 1653)
- March 4 – Kazimierz Łyszczyński, Polish philosopher (d. 1689)
- March 11 – Nicholas Gassaway, Colonel, Maryland Provincial Forces (d. 1691)
- March 12 – Cornelis Kick, Dutch painter (d. 1681)
- March 18 – Marie-Madeleine de La Fayette, French novelist (d. 1693)
- March 20 – Balthasar Bekker, Dutch minister and author of philosophical and theological works (d. 1698)
- March 23 – Philip Smythe, 2nd Viscount Strangford, English Member of Parliament (d. 1708)
- March 25 – George Bull, English theologian and Bishop of St David's (d. 1710)
- March 26 – Domenico Freschi, Italian opera composer, Catholic priest (d. 1710)
- March 28 – Sir Richard Temple, 3rd Baronet, English Member of Parliament (d. 1697)

=== April–June ===
- April 3 – Stanisław Jan Jabłonowski, Polish noble (d. 1702)
- April 8
  - John Adolphus, Duke of Schleswig-Holstein-Sonderburg-Plön, German duke (d. 1704)
  - Joseph Alleine, English Nonconformist pastor, author (d. 1668)
- April 9 – Countess Albertine Agnes of Nassau, Regent of Friesland, Groningen and Drenthe (1664–1679) (d. 1696)
- April 14 – Sir John Reresby, 2nd Baronet, 17th-century English politician and diarist (d. 1689)
- April 25 – Robert Montagu, 3rd Earl of Manchester, English politician (d. 1683)
- May 4 – Lady Katherine Ferrers, English aristocrat and heiress (d. 1660)
- May 7 – Richard Legh, English politician (d. 1687)
- May 8 – Alexander Stuart, 5th Earl of Moray, Scottish nobleman (d. 1701)
- June 1 – Roeloff Swartwout, American city founder in New York (d. 1715)
- June 6 – Maria Elisabeth of Holstein-Gottorp, Landgravine of Hesse-Darmstadt (d. 1665)
- June 14 – Nathaniel Bond, English politician (d. 1707)
- June 20 – Charles Emmanuel II, Duke of Savoy (d. 1675)
- June 27 – Andreas Cleyer, German physician, pharmacist, botanist, and trader of the Dutch East India Company (d. 1698)

=== July–September ===
- July 3 – Countess Palatine Dorothea Catherine of Birkenfeld-Bischweiler, Countess of Nassau-Ottweiler (d. 1715)
- July 8 – Thomas Butler, 6th Earl of Ossory (d. 1680)
- July 12 – John George I, Duke of Saxe-Eisenach, German duke (d. 1686)
- July 14 – Pasquier Quesnel, French Jansenist theologian (d. 1719)
- July 18 – Johannes Camphuys, Governor-General of the Dutch East Indies (d. 1695)
- July 23 – Sir John Hoskyns, 2nd Baronet, English politician (d. 1705)
- August 12 – Adam Colonia, Dutch Golden Age painter (d. 1685)
- August 16 – Johann Daniel Major, German professor of theoretical medicine (d. 1693)
- August 24 – Mary Eastey, American witch (d. 1692)
- August 31 – Paul Amman, German physician, botanist (d. 1691)
- September 4 – Robert South, English churchman known for his combative preaching (d. 1716)
- September 6 – Thomas Tryon, British hat maker (d. 1703)
- September 7 – Sir Richard Bulkeley, 1st Baronet, Irish politician (d. 1685)
- September 22 – Christiana of Schleswig-Holstein-Sonderburg-Glücksburg, duchess consort of Saxe-Merseburg (1650–1691) (d. 1701)

=== October–December ===
- October 10 – Jan van Neck, Dutch painter (d. 1714)
- October 18 – Luca Giordano, Italian late Baroque painter and printmaker in etching (d. 1705)
- November 6 – Giuseppe Ghezzi, Italian painter (d. 1721)
- November 7 – Francis Winnington, Solicitor-General for England and Wales (d. 1700)
- November 23 – Paulet St John, 3rd Earl of Bolingbroke, English politician (d. 1711)
- November 25 – Richard Slater, English politician (d. 1699)
- November 27 – Roger Toothaker, victim of the Salem witch trials (d. 1692)
- November 28 – Marie Luise von Degenfeld, morganatic second wife of Charles I Louis, Elector Palatine of Germany (d. 1677)
- December 15 – Thomas Kingo, Danish bishop (d. 1703)
- December 24 – Mariana of Austria (d. 1696)
- December 31 – Hotta Masatoshi, Japanese rōjū to Shōgun Tokugawa Ietsuna (d. 1684)

1635

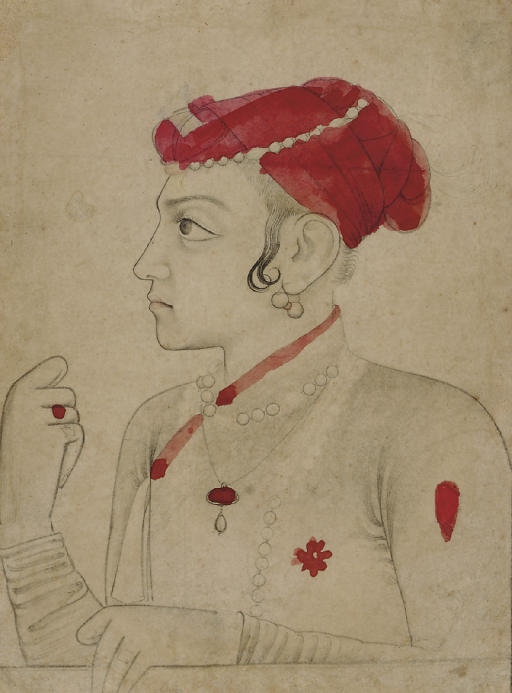
Sulaiman Shikoh

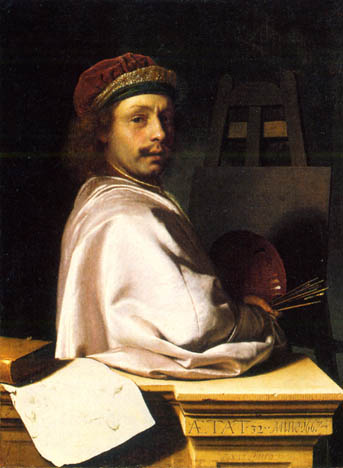
Frans van Mieris the Elder

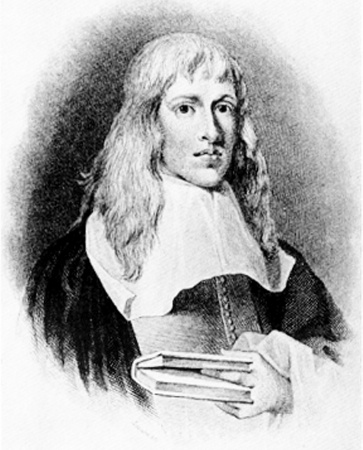
Francis Willughby

=== January–March ===
- January 2 – Wilhelmus à Brakel, Dutch theologian (d. 1711)
- January 6 – Charles Fane, 3rd Earl of Westmorland, Member of Parliament and House of Lords (d. 1691)
- January 8 – Luis Manuel Fernández de Portocarrero, Spanish Archbishop of Toledo (d. 1709)
- January 10 – Alexander Farnese, Prince of Parma, Italian military leader (d. 1689)
- January 13 – Philipp Spener, German Christian theologian known as the Father of Pietism (d. 1705)
- January 25 – Daniel Casper von Lohenstein, German writer, diplomat and lawyer (d. 1683)
- February 1 – Marquard Gude, German archaeologist and classical scholar (d. 1689)
- February 2 – William Godolphin, English politician (d. 1696)
- February 18 – Johan Göransson Gyllenstierna, Swedish statesman (d. 1680)
- February 21 – Thomas Flatman, British artist (d. 1688)
- February 25 – Walrad, Prince of Nassau-Usingen, German prince and founder of the line of Nassau-Usingen (d. 1702)
- March 2 – Eugene Maurice, Count of Soissons, Italian noble (d. 1673)
- March 4 – Emilia Butler, Countess of Ossory, English countess (d. 1688)
- March 10 – Jan van Buken, Flemish painter (d. 1690)
- March 15 – Sulaiman Shikoh, Mughal Empire emperor (d. 1662)
- March 31 – Patrick Gordon, Scottish-born Russian general, rear admiral (d. 1699)

=== April–June ===
- April 16 – Frans van Mieris the Elder, Dutch Golden Age genre and portrait painter (d. 1681)
- April 17 – Edward Stillingfleet, British theologian and scholar (d. 1699)
- April 25 – William Harbord, British politician (d. 1692)
- May 4 – Willem van Outhoorn, Dutch colonial governor (d. 1720)
- May 6 – Johann Joachim Becher, German chemist (d. 1682)
- May 9 – Augustus, Duke of Schleswig-Holstein-Sonderburg-Plön-Norburg (d. 1699)
- May 26 – Sir Thomas Lee, 1st Baronet, English politician (d. 1691)
- June 3 – Philippe Quinault, French writer (d. 1688)
- June 10 – Federico Caccia, Cardinal Archbishop of Milan (d. 1699)
- June 15 – Theodor Undereyk, German theologian (d. 1693)
- June 20 – Patrick Chaworth, 3rd Viscount Chaworth, Irish politician (d. 1693)
- June 21 – Laurent d'Arvieux, French traveler (d. 1702)

=== July–September ===
- July 11 – Gottfried Wilhelm Sacer, German jurist (d. 1699)
- July 13 – Jacques Bruyas, French missionary (d. 1712)
- July 19 – Francine Descartes, daughter of French philosopher René Descartes (d. 1640)
- July 23 – Adam Dollard des Ormeaux, iconic figure in the history of New France (d. 1660)
- July 28 – Robert Hooke, English scientist (d. 1703)
- July 29 – Christian Louis, Count of Waldeck-Wildungen (1645–1692) and Count of Waldeck and Pyrmont (1692–1706) (d. 1706)
- August 9 – Philip Traherne, British book collector (d. 1686)
- August 24 – Peder Griffenfeld, Danish statesman and royal favourite (d. 1699)
- August 30 – Pieter Spierinckx, Flemish painter (d. 1711)
- September 1 – Armand de Camboust, duc de Coislin, French lieutenant général (d. 1702)
- September 5 – Joseph Mezger, Austrian Benedictine (d. 1683)
- September 7 – Paul I, Prince Esterházy, Hungarian prince (d. 1713)
- September 9 – Andrzej Stech, Polish painter (d. 1697)
- September 17 – Peter Colleton, English politician (d. 1694)
- September 18 – Joana, Princess of Beira, Portuguese infanta (princess) (d. 1653)

Date unknown

- Luís de Vasconcelos e Sousa, 3rd Count of Castelo Melhor, Portuguese politician and prime minister (d. 1720)

=== October–December ===
- October 7
  - Christopher Comstock, American settler (d. 1702)
  - Roger de Piles, French painter (d. 1709)
- October 28 – Constantin Ranst de Jonge, son of Hieronimus Rans(t) (1607–1660) (d. 1714)
- November 1 – Johann Michael Vansleb, German theologian (d. 1679)
- November 3 – Johann Sturm, German philosopher (d. 1703)
- November 6 – Sir John Carew, 3rd Baronet, English Member of Parliament (d. 1692)
- November 11 – Justus Danckerts, Dutch artist (d. 1701)
- November 15 – Margaret Yolande of Savoy, duchess consort of Parma (d. 1663)
- November 19 – Mingju, Qing Dynasty statesman (d. 1708)
- November 22 – Francis Willughby, English biologist (d. 1672)
- November 27 – Madame de Maintenon, second wife of Louis XIV of France (d. 1719)
- December 11 – Sir William Twysden, 3rd Baronet, English politician (d. 1697)
- December 15 – Valentin Alberti, Silesian philosopher, theologian (d. 1697)
- December 23 – Ottaviano Jannella, Italian sculptor (d. 1661)
- December 28 – Elizabeth Stuart, second daughter of King Charles I of England (d. 1650)
- December 31 – Sir Robert Southwell, English diplomat (d. 1702)

Date unknown

- Thomas Betterton, English actor (d. 1710)
- Sir Henry Morgan, Welsh privateer (d. 1688)

1636

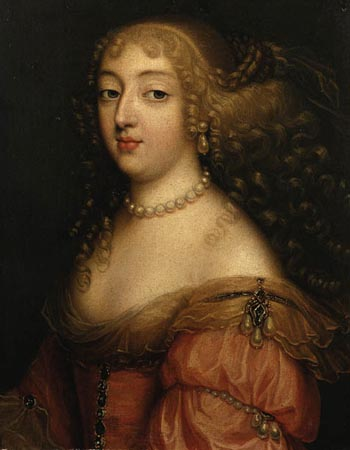
Laura Mancini

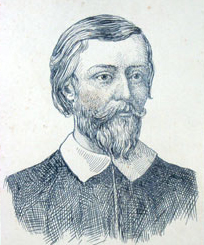
Gregório de Matos

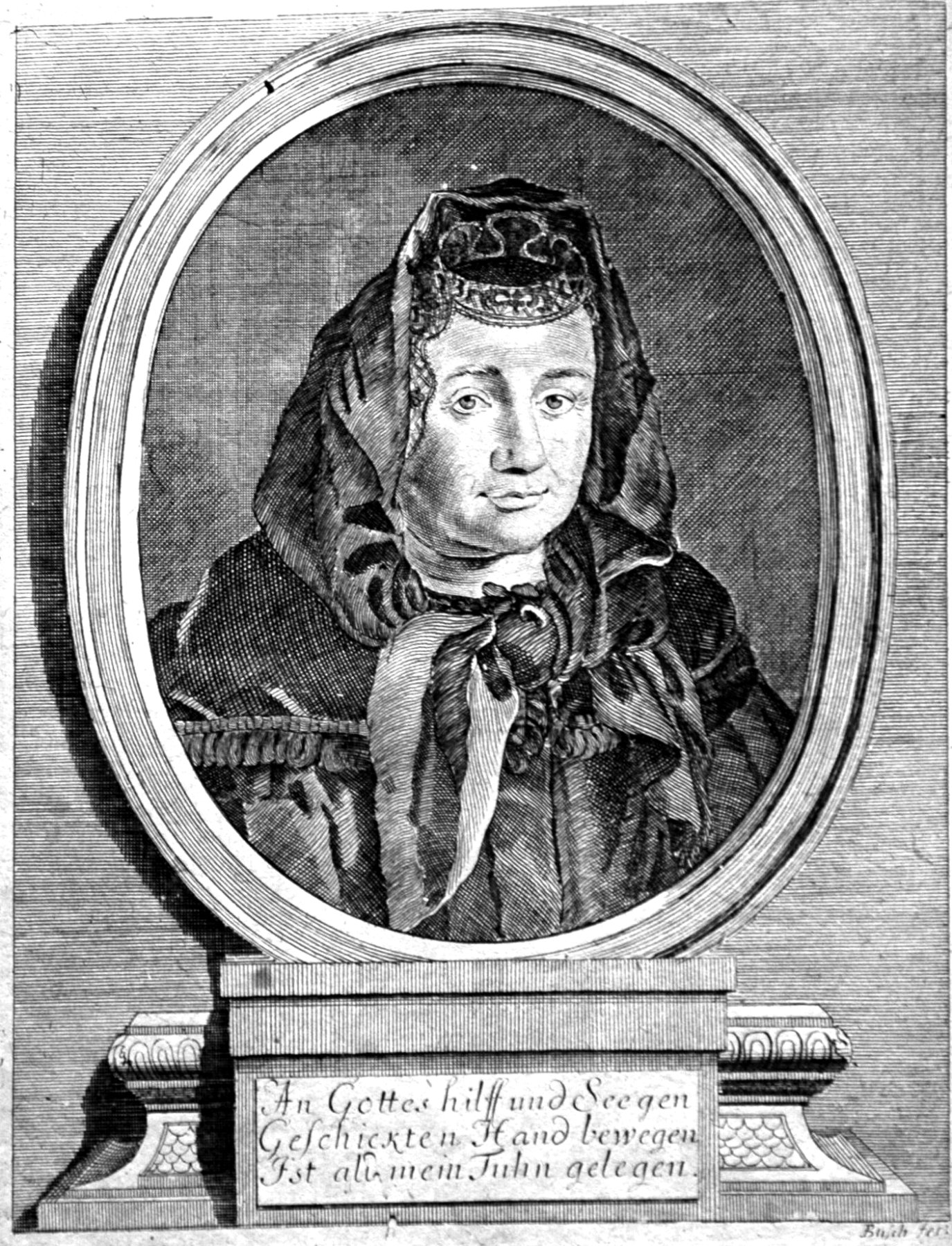
Justine Siegemund

=== January–March ===
- January 1 – Jacques Cassagne, French clergyman (d. 1679)
- January 8 – Fernando de Valenzuela, 1st Marquis of Villasierra, Spanish noble (d. 1692)
- January 12 – Jean-Baptiste Monnoyer, French painter (d. 1699)
- January 20 – Count Maximilian I, Prince of Hohenzollern-Sigmaringen (d. 1689)
- February 6 – Heiman Dullaart, Dutch painter (d. 1684)
- February 12 – Hermann Witsius, Dutch theologian (d. 1708)
- February 16 – Shubael Dummer, American Congregational church minister (d. 1692)
- March 1 – Giacinto Camillo Maradei, Italian Catholic prelate, Bishop of Policastro (d. 1705)
- March 8 – Robert Kerr, 1st Marquess of Lothian (d. 1703)
- March 13 – Ulrik Huber, Dutch philosopher (d. 1694)
- March 25 – Henric Piccardt, Dutch lawyer (d. 1712)

=== April–June ===
- April 6 – Noël Bouton de Chamilly, Marshal of France (d. 1715)
- April 10 – Balthasar Kindermann, German poet (d. 1706)
- April 13 – Hendrik van Rheede, Dutch botanist (d. 1691)
- April 29 – Esaias Reusner, German lutenist and composer (d. 1679)
- May 6 – Laura Mancini, French court beauty (d. 1657)
- May 17 – Edward Colman, English Catholic courtier under Charles II (d. 1678)
- May 22 – Ferdinand Albert I, Duke of Brunswick-Lüneburg (d. 1687)
- May 27 – Thormodus Torfæus, Icelandic historian (d. 1719)
- June 3 – John Hale, Beverly minister (d. 1700)
- June 15
  - Sir Thomas Slingsby, 2nd Baronet of England (d. 1688)
  - Charles de La Fosse, French painter (d. 1716)
- June 21 – Godefroy Maurice de La Tour d'Auvergne, Duke of Bouillon, French noble (d. 1721)
- June 29 – Thomas Hyde, English orientalist (d. 1703)

=== July–September ===
- July 2 – Daniel Speer, German Baroque composer and writer (d. 1709)
- July 12 – Count Ferdinand Edzard of East Frisia, German nobleman (d. 1668)
- July 31 – Josias II, Count of Waldeck-Wildungen, major general in Brunswick and co-ruler of Waldeck-Wildungen (d. 1669)
- August 25 – Louis Victor de Rochechouart de Mortemart, French military man, brother of Madame de Montespan (d. 1688)
- September 5 – Ignace-Gaston Pardies, French physicist (d. 1673)
- September 24 – Francesco Vaccaro, Italian painter (d. 1675)
- September 25 – Ferdinand Joseph, Prince of Dietrichstein, German prince (d. 1698)
- September 28 – Sophia Dorothea of Schleswig-Holstein-Sonderburg-Glücksburg, Prussian royal consort (d. 1689)
- September 29 – Thomas Tenison, Archbishop of Canterbury (d. 1715)

=== October–December ===
- October 6 – George Frederick, Count of Erbach-Breuberg, Count of Erbach and Breuberg (1653) (d. 1653)
- October 15 – John Strangways, English politician (d. 1676)
- October 23 – Hedwig Eleonora of Holstein-Gottorp, queen consort of King Charles X Gustav of Sweden (d. 1715)
- October 31 – Ferdinand Maria, Elector of Bavaria, Wittelsbach ruler of Bavaria and an elector of the Holy Roman Empire (d. 1679)
- November 1 – Nicolas Boileau-Despréaux, French poet and critic (d. 1711)
- November 2 – Edward Colston, Bristol-born English slave trader (d. 1721)
- November 6
  - Princess Catherine Beatrice of Savoy, daughter of the Duke of Savoy (d. 1637)
  - Princess Henriette Adelaide of Savoy, wife of Ferdinand Maria (d. 1676)
- November 11 – Yan Ruoqu, Chinese scholar (d. 1704)
- November 14 – Pierre du Cambout de Coislin, French prelate (d. 1706)
- November 30
  - Johannes Fabritius, Dutch painter (d. 1693)
  - Adriaen van de Velde, Dutch painter (d. 1672)
- December 1 – Elizabeth Capell, Countess of Essex, British countess (d. 1718)
- December 23 – Gregório de Matos, Brazilian poet and lawyer (d. 1696)
- December 26 – Justine Siegemund, German writer (d. 1705)
- December 27 – William Whitelock, English gentleman, Member of Parliament (d. 1717)

=== date unknown ===
- Mary Rowlandson, American author and captive during King Philip's War (d. 1711)
- George Etherege, English playwright (d. 1692)

1637

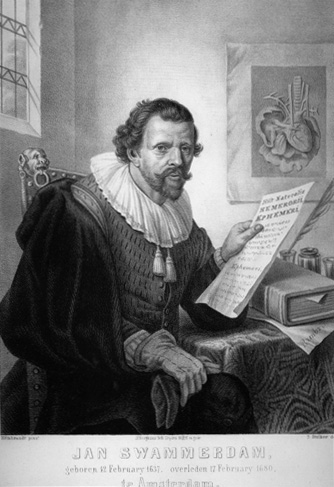
Jan Swammerdam

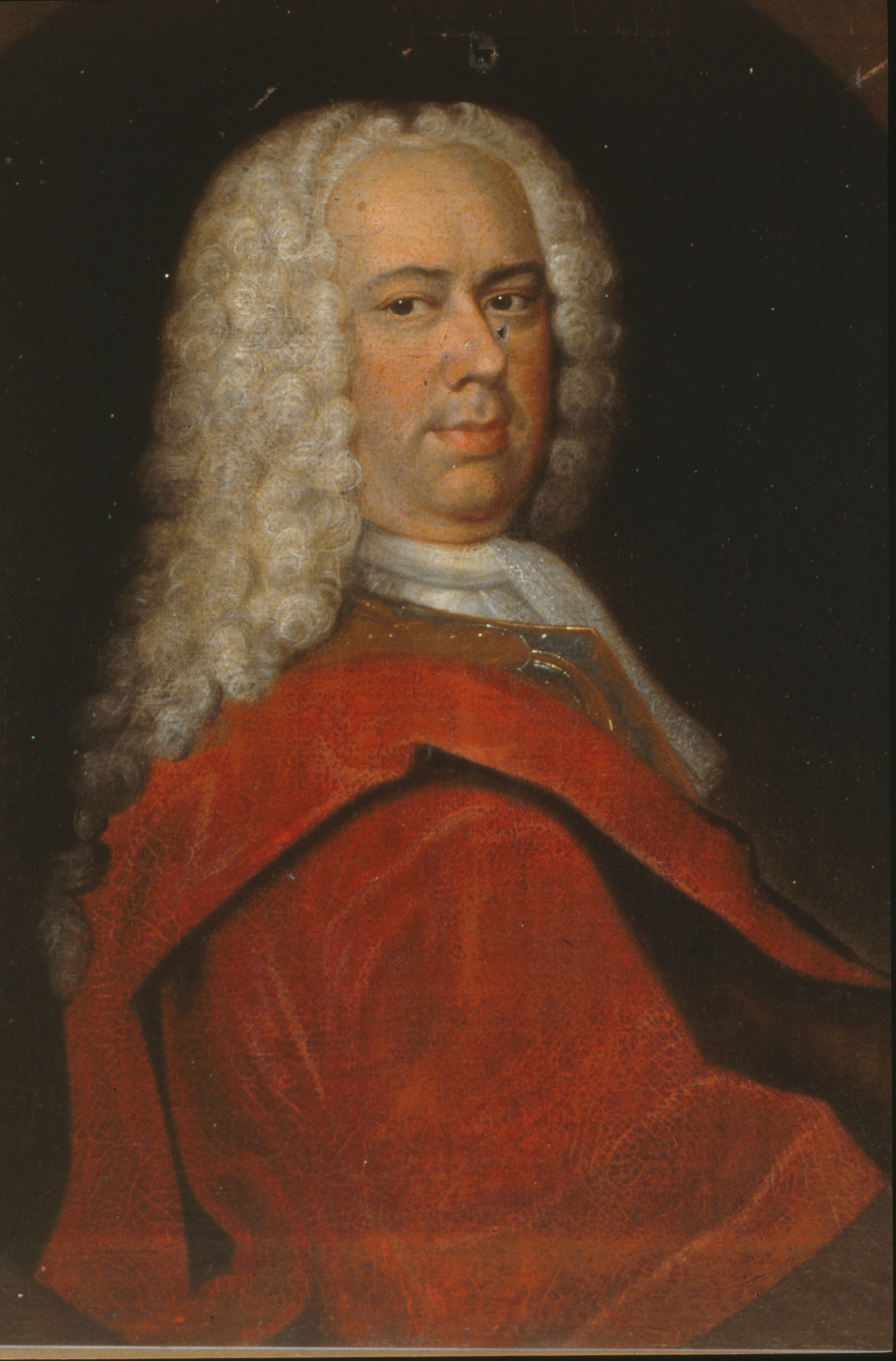
Johan Vibe

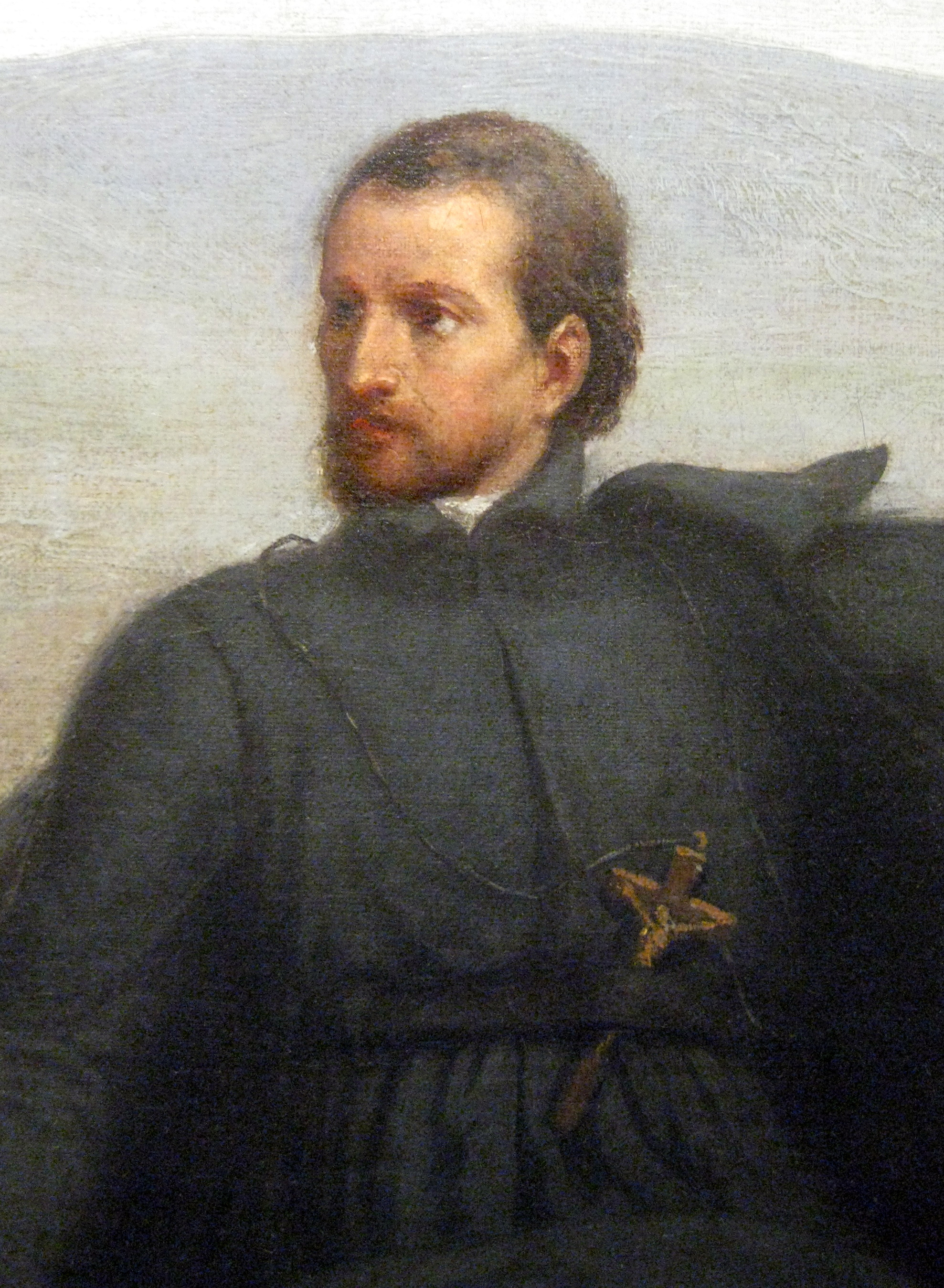
Jacques Marquette

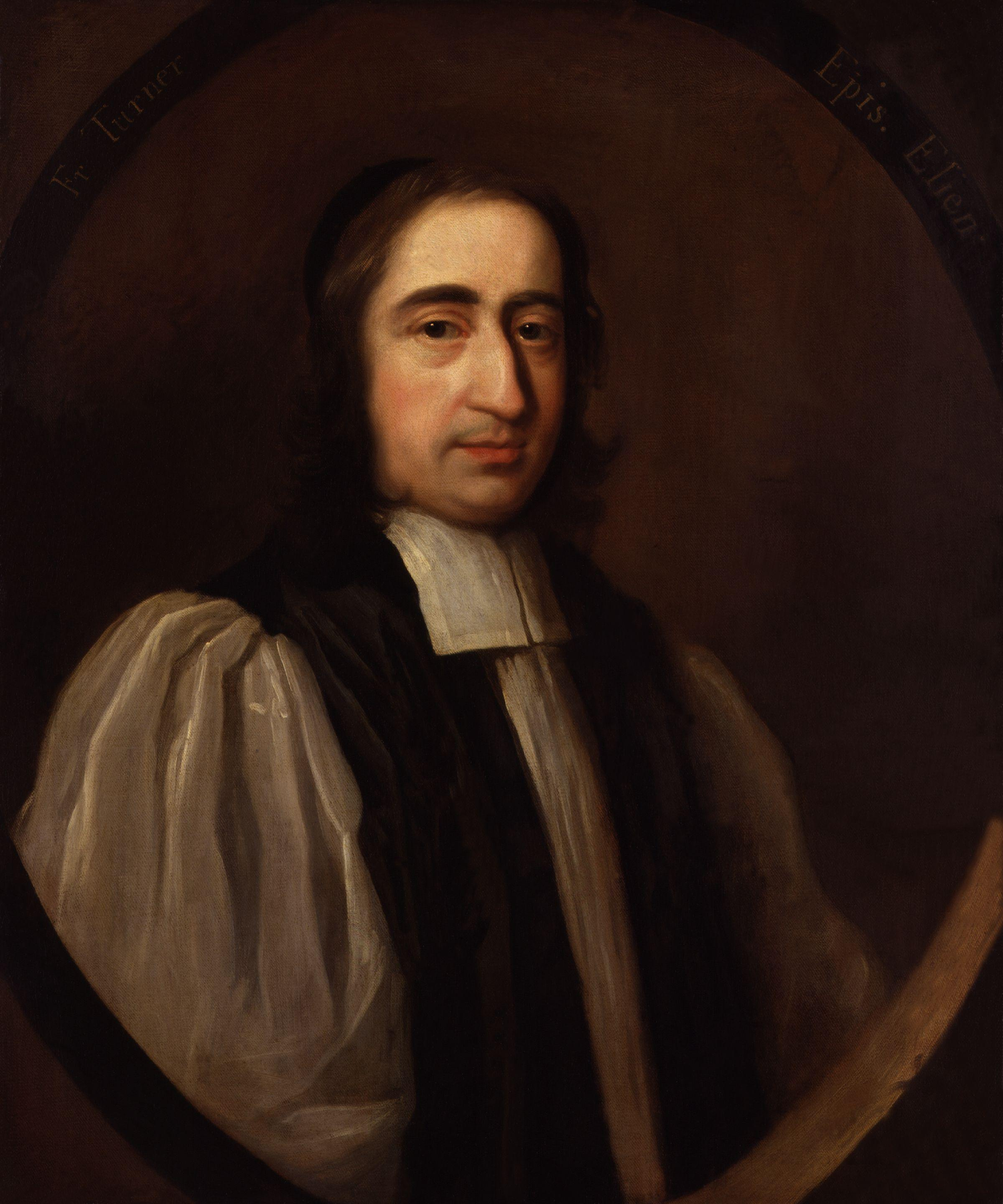
Francis Turner

=== January–March ===
- January 14 – Mattia de Rossi, Italian painter (d. 1695)
- January 18 – Manuel Fernández de Santa Cruz, Spanish religious writer, Catholic prelate and bishop (d. 1699)
- February 10
  - Countess Henriette Catherine of Nassau, daughter of Frederick Henry (d. 1708)
  - William Paget, 6th Baron Paget, English peer and ambassador (d. 1713)
- February 11 – Friedrich Nicolaus Bruhns, German organist and composer (d. 1718)
- February 12 – Jan Swammerdam, Dutch biologist and microscopist (d. 1680)
- February 13 – Denis Granville, English priest (d. 1703)
- February 21 – William Beveridge, English Bishop of St. Asaph (d. 1708)
- March 1 – Thomas Watson, Bishop of St. David's (d. 1717)
- March 2 – Sir Stephen Lennard, 2nd Baronet, English politician (d. 1709)
- March 5 – Jan van der Heyden, Dutch Baroque-era painter (d. 1712)
- March 14 – Fitz-John Winthrop, Governor of the Connecticut Colony (d. 1707)
- March 17 – Anne of England, daughter of King Charles I (d. 1640)
- March 30 – Samuel Pitiscus, Dutch classical scholar (d. 1727)

=== April–June ===
- April 6 – Sir William Whitmore, 2nd Baronet, English politician and baronet (d. 1699)
- April 16
  - Jean-Jacques Clérion, French sculptor who worked mainly for King Louis XIV (d. 1714)
  - Johan Vibe, Norwegian noble (d. 1710)
- April 19 – Mateo Cerezo, Spanish artist (d. 1666)
- May 13 – Giacinto Cestoni, Italian naturalist (d. 1718)
- May 22 – John Kyrle, British philanthropist (d. 1724)
- May 31 – Louis Laneau, French bishop active in the kingdom of Siam (d. 1696)
- June 1 – Jacques Marquette, French Jesuit missionary and explorer (d. 1675)
- June 11 – Tamura Muneyoshi, Japanese daimyō of the Iwanuma Domain (d. 1678)
- June 21 – Asano Tsunaakira, Lord of Hiroshima Domain (d. 1673)
- June 22
  - Takatsukasa Fusasuke, Japanese court noble of the early Edo period (d. 1700)
  - Christian II, Count Palatine of Zweibrücken-Birkenfeld (d. 1717)
  - Joseph Werner, Swiss painter (d. 1710)
- June 25 – Christophe Veyrier, French sculptor (d. 1689)

=== July–September ===
- July 24 – Nathaniel Fairfax, English divine and physician (d. 1690)
- August 16 – Countess Emilie Juliane of Barby-Mühlingen, German noblewoman and hymn author (d. 1706)
- August 19 – Roemer Vlacq, Dutch naval commander (d. 1703)
- August 20 – Cornelis van Aerssen van Sommelsdijck, first Dutch governor of Suriname (d. 1688)
- August 23 – Francis Turner, British bishop (d. 1700)
- August 27 – Charles Calvert, 3rd Baron Baltimore, Colonial governor of Maryland (d. 1715)
- September 1 – Nicolas Catinat, French military commander and Marshal of France under Louis XIV (d. 1712)
- September 15 – James Brodie, Scottish politician (d. 1708)
- September 16 – Elisha Cooke, Sr., Massachusetts colonial politician and judge (d. 1715)
- September 26 – Sébastien Leclerc, French painter (d. 1714)

=== October–December ===
- October 3 – George Gordon, 1st Earl of Aberdeen, Lord Chancellor of Scotland (d. 1720)
- October 13 – Paul Fugger von Kirchberg und Weißenhorn, German politician (d. 1701)
- October 22 – Francis North, 1st Baron Guilford (d. 1685)
- October 24 – Lorenzo Magalotti, Italian philosopher (d. 1712)
- October 27 – Al-Mahdi Muhammad, Yemeni imam (d. 1718)
- November 4 – Juan Francisco de la Cerda, 8th Duke of Medinaceli, Spanish politician (d. 1691)
- November 23 – Paul Mezger, Austrian Benedictine theologian and academic (d. 1702)
- November 25 – Armand de Gramont, Comte de Guiche, French nobleman (d. 1673)
- November 30 – Louis-Sébastien Le Nain de Tillemont, French ecclesiastical historian (d. 1698)
- December 6 – Edmund Andros, English colonial administrator in North America (d. 1714)
- December 7
  - William Neile, English mathematician and founder member of the Royal Society (d. 1670)
  - Bernardo Pasquini, Italian composer of operas (d. 1710)
- December 10 – Jacques-René de Brisay de Denonville, Marquis de Denonville (d. 1710)
- December 19 – Sir William Leman, 2nd Baronet, English politician (d. 1701)
- December 24 – Pierre Jurieu, French Protestant leader (d. 1713)
- December 27 – Petar Kanavelić, Venetian writer (d. 1719)
- December 30 – William Cave, English divine (d. 1713)

1638

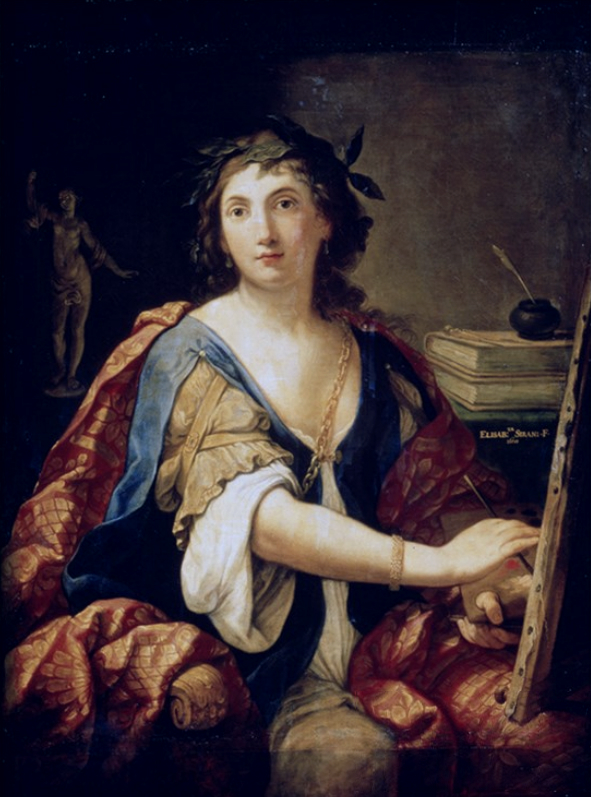
Elisabetta Sirani

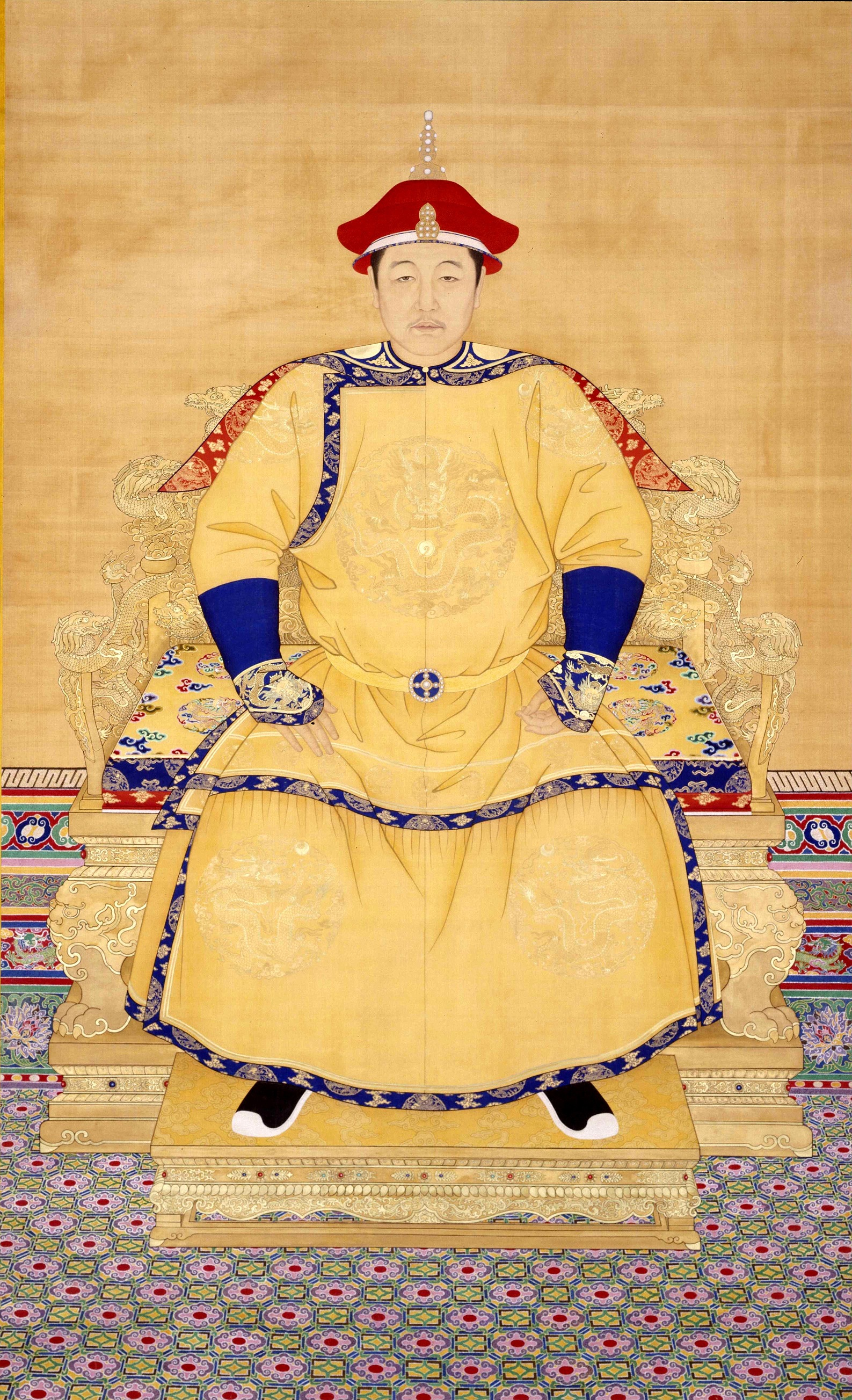
Shunzhi Emperor

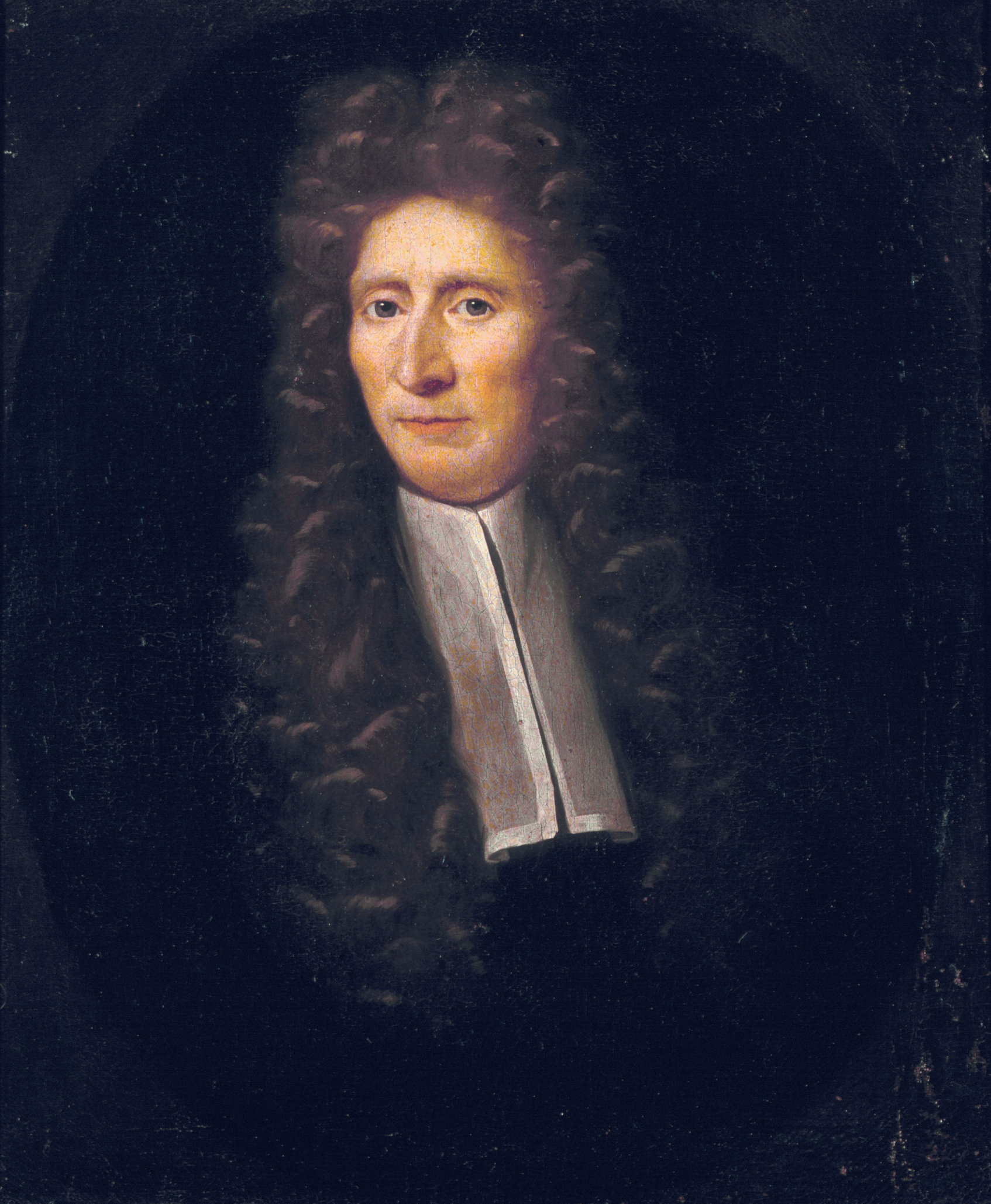
Frederik Ruysch

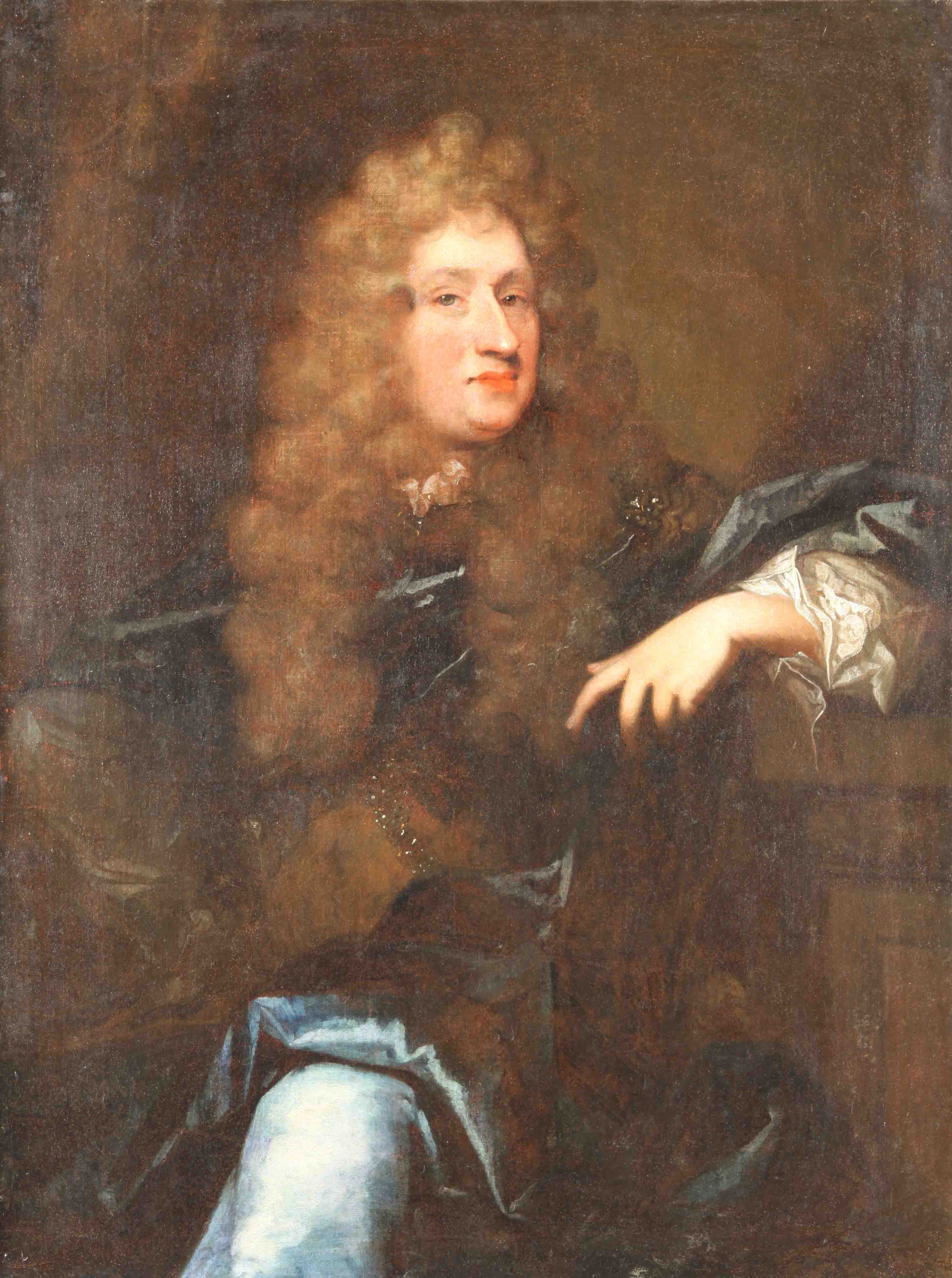
Ulrik Frederik Gyldenløve

Louis XIV

=== January–March ===
- January 1
  - Antoinette du Ligier de la Garde Deshoulières, French writer (d. 1694)
  - Emperor Go-Sai of Japan (d. 1685)
  - Nicolas Steno, Danish pioneer in anatomy and geology, bishop (d. 1686)
- January 7
  - Filippo Bonanni, Italian Jesuit scholar (d. 1723)
  - Marie Elisabeth of Brunswick-Wolfenbüttel, German noblewoman (d. 1687)
- January 8 – Elisabetta Sirani, Italian painter (d. 1665)
- January 12 – Ernst Rüdiger von Starhemberg, Austrian field marshal (d. 1701)
- January 20 – Sir William Glynne, 1st Baronet, English politician (d. 1690)
- January 21
  - David Elias Heidenreich, German poet, dramatist, librettist and translator (d. 1688)
  - Beata Rosenhane, Swedish writer (d. 1674)
- February 13 – Frederick, Duke of Mecklenburg-Grabow, German nobleman, titular Duke of Mecklenburg (d. 1688)
- February 18 – Ikeda Tsunamasa, Japanese daimyō, ruler of the Okayama Domain (d. 1714)
- February 25 – Jørgen Iversen Dyppel, Governor of the Danish West Indies (d. 1683)
- February 28 – John Carmichael, 1st Earl of Hyndford, Scottish nobleman (d. 1710)
- March 6
  - Henry Capell, 1st Baron Capell of Tewkesbury, First Lord’s of the British Admiralty (d. 1696)
  - Statz Friedrich von Fullen, German-born nobleman, Geheimrat of war for Poland (d. 1703)
- March 10 – John Vesey, Irish archbishop (d. 1716)
- March 14 – Johann Georg Gichtel, German mystic and religious leader, critic of Lutheranism (d. 1710)
- March 15 – Shunzhi Emperor of China (d. 1661)
- March 16 – François Crépieul, Jesuit missionary in Canada (d. 1702)
- March 28 – Frederik Ruysch, Dutch physician and anatomist (d. 1731)

=== April–June ===
- April 2
  - Sir Henry Beaumont, 2nd Baronet, English politician (d. 1689)
  - John Covel, English clergyman and scientist, Master of Christ's College (d. 1722)
- May 9 – Gregorio Vasquez de Arce y Ceballos, Colombian painter (d. 1711)
- May 11 – Guy-Crescent Fagon, French physician and botanist (d. 1718)
- May 12 – Pedro Atanasio Bocanegra, Spanish artist (d. 1688)
- May 13 – Richard Simon, French Biblical critic (d. 1712)
- May 29 – John Manners, 1st Duke of Rutland, English nobleman and politician (d. 1711)
- June 2 – Henry Hyde, 2nd Earl of Clarendon, English nobleman (d. 1709)
- June 3 – Thomas Smith, English scholar (d. 1710)
- June 8 – Pierre Magnol, French botanist (d. 1715)
- June 21 – Sir William Roberts, 1st Baronet, English politician (d. 1688)
- June 23 – Princess Christine Elisabeth of Schleswig-Holstein-Sonderburg, German noblewoman (d. 1679)
- June 27 – Samuel Frisching, Bernese soldier and politician (d. 1721)
- June 28 – Louise Marie de La Grange d'Arquien, French noblewoman (d. 1728)
- June 29 – Heinrich Meibom, German physicist and scholar (d. 1700)

=== July–September ===
- July 10 – David Teniers III, Flemish painter (d. 1685)
- July 11 – Olympia Mancini, French courtier (d. 1708)
- July 15 – Giovanni Buonaventura Viviani, Italian composer (d. 1693)
- July 20 – Ulrik Frederik Gyldenløve, leading Norwegian general during the Scanian War (d. 1704)
- July 25 – Cristobal of Saint Catherine, Spanish Catholic priest (d. 1690)
- August 3 – William Louis, Prince of Anhalt-Köthen (1650–1665) (d. 1665)
- August 6 – Nicolas Malebranche, French philosopher (d. 1715)
- August 7 – John Tufton, 4th Earl of Thanet, English politician (d. 1680)
- August 13 – Durgadas Rathore, Indian ruler (d. 1718)
- August 15 – Pieter de Graeff, Dutch politician and noble (d. 1707)
- August 22 – Georg Christoph Eimmart, German engraver (d. 1705)
- September 5 – Louis XIV, King of France from 1643 until his death (d. 1715)
- September 10 – Maria Theresa of Spain, queen consort of Louis XIV of France (d. 1683)
- September 19 – Isaac Milles, English minister (d. 1720)
- September 20 – Antonio Gherardi, Italian painter (d. 1702)
- September 21 – Philippe de Courcillon, French officer and author (d. 1720)
- September 30 – Maximilian Philipp Hieronymus, Duke of Bavaria-Leuchtenberg, German nobleman (d. 1705)

=== October–December ===
- October 7 – Miguel Jerónimo de Molina, Spanish prelate, Bishop of Malta, then of Lleida in Catalonia (d. 1698)
- October 14 – Bernhard II, Duke of Saxe-Jena, German noble (d. 1678)
- October 17 – John Charles, Count Palatine of Gelnhausen (1654–1704) (d. 1704)
- October 21 – Lucia Wijbrants, Dutch artist (d. 1719)
- October 31 – Meindert Hobbema, Dutch painter (d. 1709)
- November 4 – Nuno Álvares Pereira de Melo, 1st Duke of Cadaval, Portuguese nobleman and statesman (d. 1725)
- November 8 – Anton van Dale, Dutch minister (d. 1708)
- November 22 – Christoph Cellarius, German classical scholar (d. 1707)
- November 25 – Catherine of Braganza, Portuguese princess, queen consort of Charles II of England (d. 1705)
- November 30 – Joachim Feller, German professor at the University of Leipzig (d. 1691)
- December 17 – Anna Sophia II, Abbess of Quedlinburg (d. 1683)
- December 24 – Tomás de la Cerda, 3rd Marquis of la Laguna, Spanish nobleman (d. 1692)
- December 25 – Michel Bégon, French ancien regime official (d. 1710)

=== Date unknown ===
- Hannah Allen, British writer (d. 1668)

1639

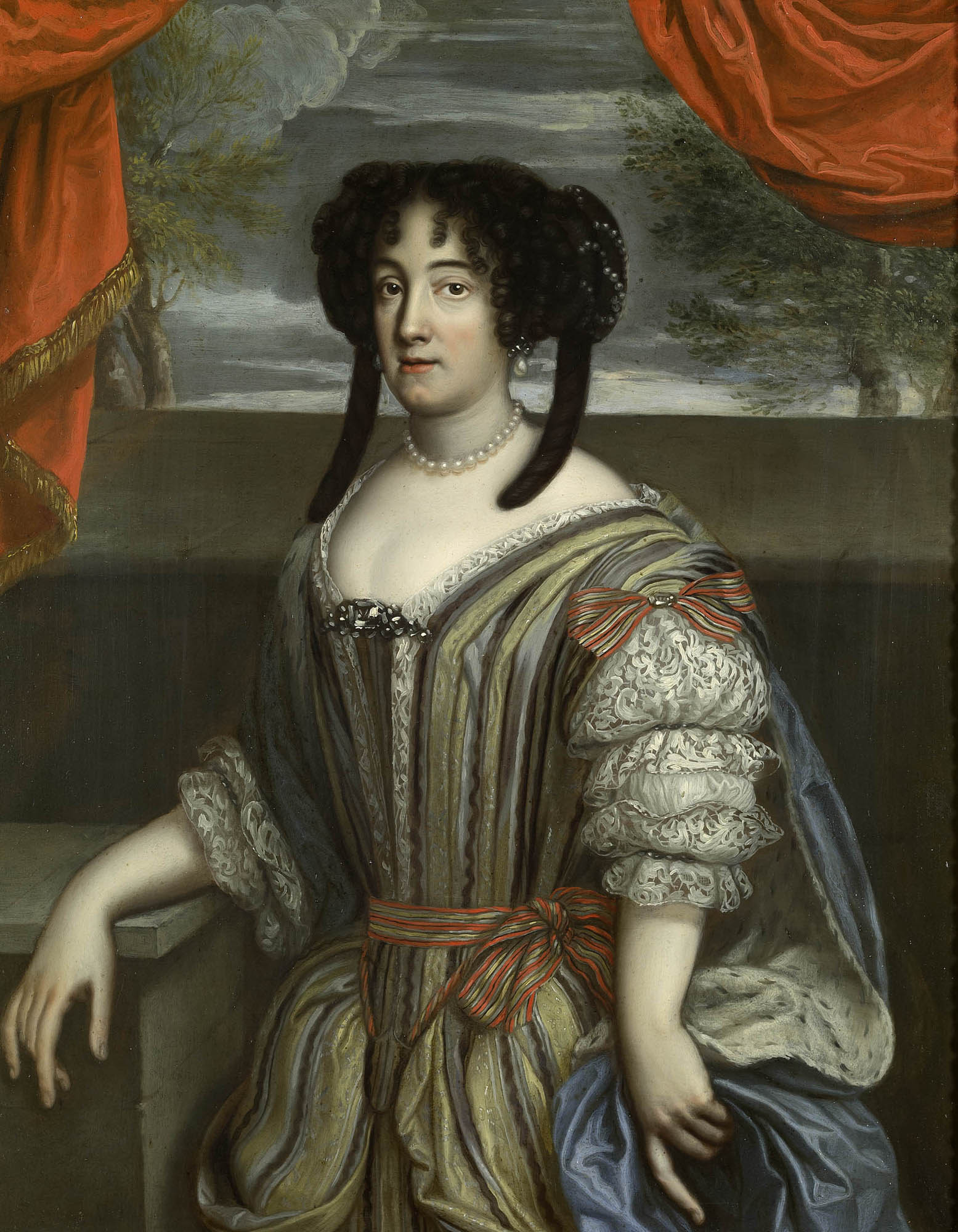
Éléonore Desmier d'Olbreuse

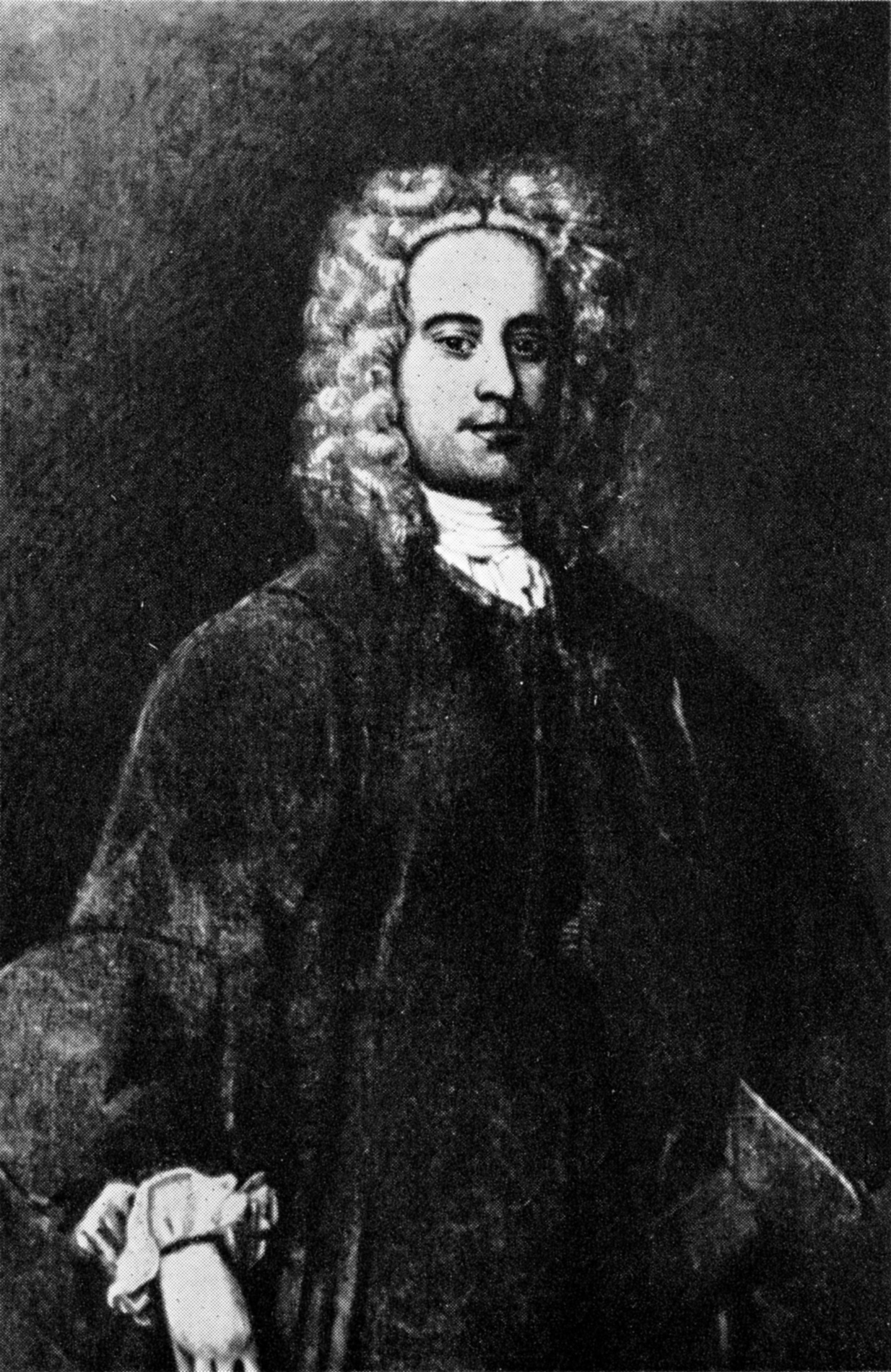
Martin Lister

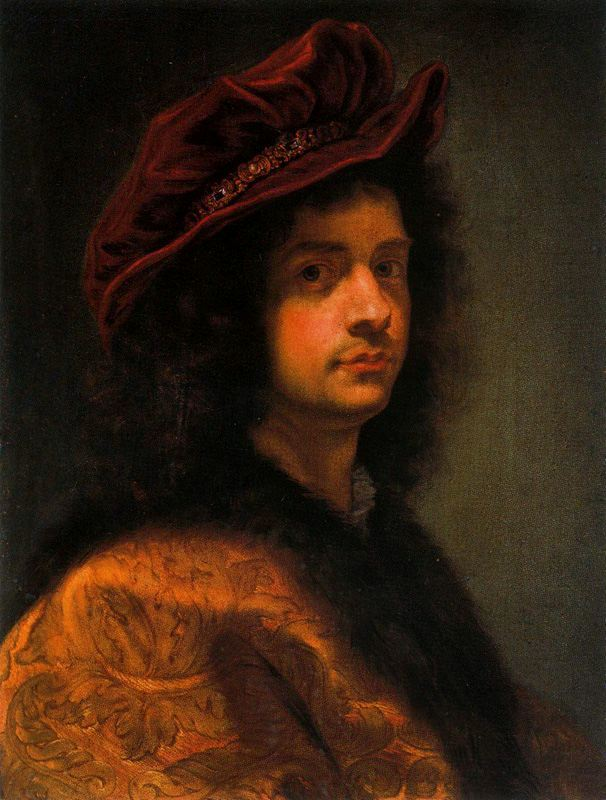
Giovanni Battista Gaulli

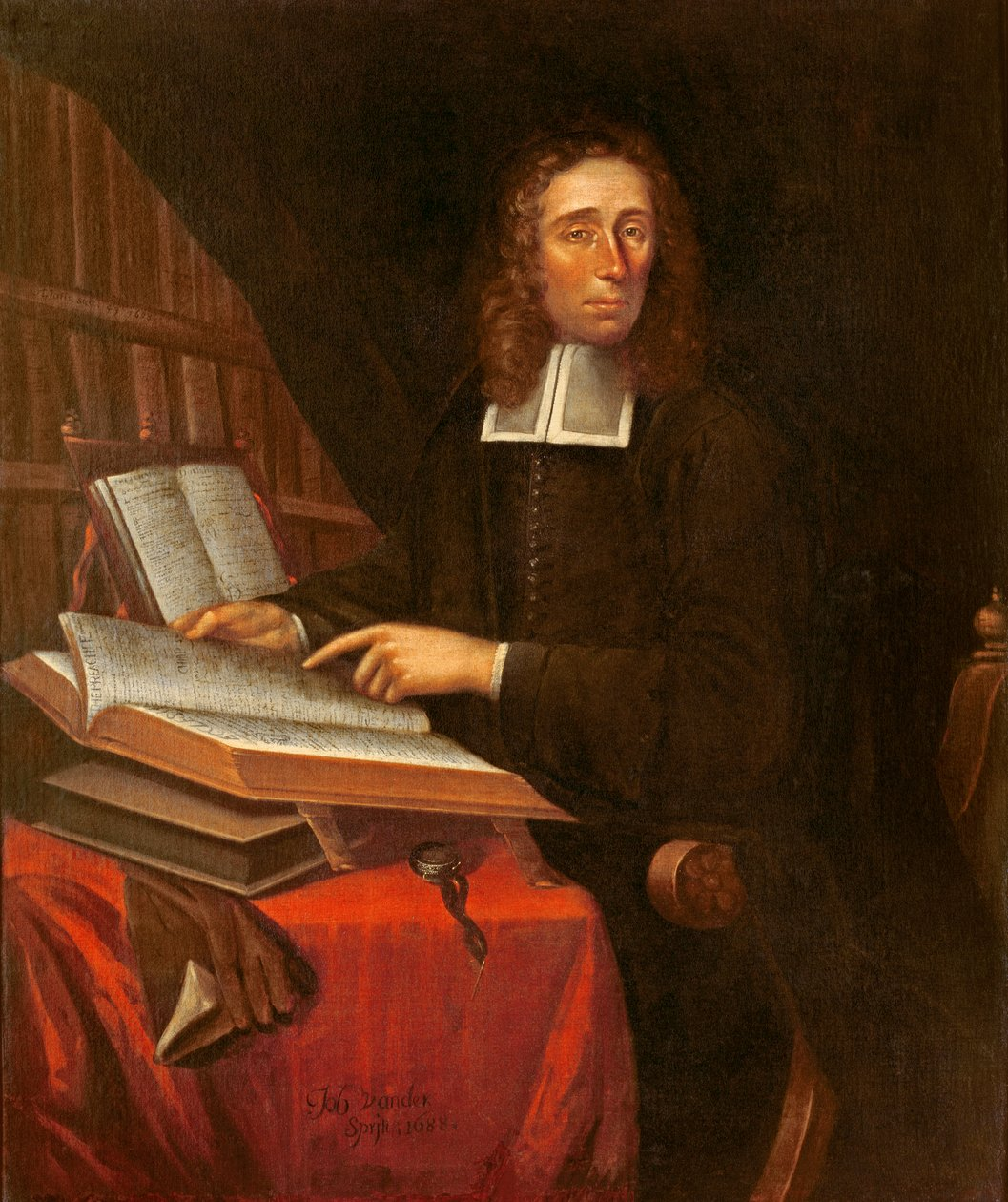
Increase Mather

=== January–March ===
- January 1
  - Jacob Knijff, Dutch painter (d. 1681)
  - Sir Thomas Spencer, 3rd Baronet, English Member of Parliament (d. 1685)
- January 3 – Éléonore Desmier d'Olbreuse, French Huguenot noblewoman, grandmother of George II of Great Britain, great-grandmother of Frederick the Great (d. 1722)
- January 5 – Otto Wilhelm Königsmarck, Swedish military officer (d. 1688)
- January 16 – John Proby, English politician (d. 1710)
- January 17 – Sir Francis Lee, 4th Baronet, English Member of Parliament (d. 1667)
- January 19 – Noël Alexandre, French theologian and ecclesiastical historian (d. 1724)
- January 20 – Hungerford Dunch, English politician (d. 1680)
- January 29 – Gover Le Buen, Dutch revolutionary fighter (d. 1712)
- January 31 – Duke Bernhard of Schleswig-Holstein-Sonderburg-Plön, German-Danish general (d. 1676)
- February 4 – Alessandro Melani, Italian composer (d. 1703)
- February 6 – Daniel Georg Morhof, German writer and scholar (d. 1691)
- February 12 – Juan García de Salazar, Spanish Baroque composer (d. 1710)
- February 17 – Claude Estiennot de la Serre, French historian (d. 1699)
- February 27 – Adriaen van Bloemen, Flemish painter, printmaker, draughtsman and engraver (d. 1697)
- March 7 – Charles Stewart, 3rd Duke of Richmond, English nobleman (d. 1672)
- March 20 – Ivan Mazepa, Hetman of Ukraine (d. 1709)
- March 30 – Elanor Allerton, English-born American colonist (d. 1674)

=== April–June ===
- April 3 – Alessandro Stradella, Italian composer (k. 1682)
- April 12 – Martin Lister, English naturalist and physician (d. 1712)
- April 13 – Joan Leonardsz Blasius, Dutch writer (d. 1672)
- April 16 – Alessandro Baratta, Italian painter, engraver (d. 1714)
- April 24 – Johann Benedict Carpzov II, German theologian (d. 1699)
- April 29 – François Nepveu, French Jesuit writer on ascetical subjects (d. 1708)
- May 8 – Giovanni Battista Gaulli, Italian artist working in the High Baroque and early Rococo periods (d. 1709)
- May 10 – Peleg Sanford, Rhode Island colonial governor (d. 1701)
- May 19 – Charles Weston, 3rd Earl of Portland, English nobleman (d. 1665)
- May 27 – Laura Martinozzi, Duchess consort of Modena (d. 1687)
- June 21 – Increase Mather, American minister (d. 1723)

=== July–September ===
- July 8 – John Vaughan, 3rd Earl of Carbery, English politician and Irish nobleman (d. 1713)
- July 15 – Richard Butler, 1st Earl of Arran, Irish soldier (d. 1686)
- August 18 – William Lowther, English landowner and politician (d. 1705)
- August 28 – Marie Mancini, Italian courtier, third of the five Mancini sisters (d. 1715)
- August 30 – Cornelia van der Veer, Dutch poet (d. 1704)
- September 7 – David Martin, French theologian (d. 1721)
- September 8 – William Trumbull, English diplomat and politician (d. 1716)
- September 17 – Hans Herr, Swiss-born Mennonite bishop (d. 1725)
- September 21 – Robbert Duval, painter from the Northern Netherlands (d. 1732)
- September 29
  - William Russell, Lord Russell, English politician (d. 1683)
  - Sir John Seton, 1st Baronet of Nova Scotia (d. 1686)

=== October–December ===
- October 14 – Simon van der Stel, last Commander and first Governor of the Cape Colony (d. 1712)
- October 17 – Charles-Claude Genest, French dramatist and playwright (d. 1719)
- November 17 – Eleazer Kimberly, Secretary of the State of Connecticut (d. 1709)
- November 21 – Fortunatus Hueber, German Franciscan historian and theologian (d. 1706)
- December 3 – Isidoro de Atondo y Antillon, Spanish admiral (d. 1689)
- December 18 – Gottfried Kirch, German astronomer, first 'Astronomer Royal' in Berlin (d. 1710)
- December 22 – Jean Racine, French dramatist (d. 1699)
- December 28 – Dirk van Bleiswijk, Dutch politician, writer (d. 1681)
- December 29 – Muhammad Sultan, Mughal Empire emperor (d. 1676)

=== Date unknown ===
- Yair Bacharach, German rabbi (d. 1702)
- Consort Donggo, concubine of the Shunzhi Emperor of the Qing Dynasty (d. 1660)
- Dirck Ferreris, Dutch painter (d. 1693)
- Caspar Netscher, Dutch painter (d. 1684)
- Samuel Peterson, early Swedish settler of New Sweden, founder of modern-day Wilmington (d. 1689)

== Deaths ==
1630

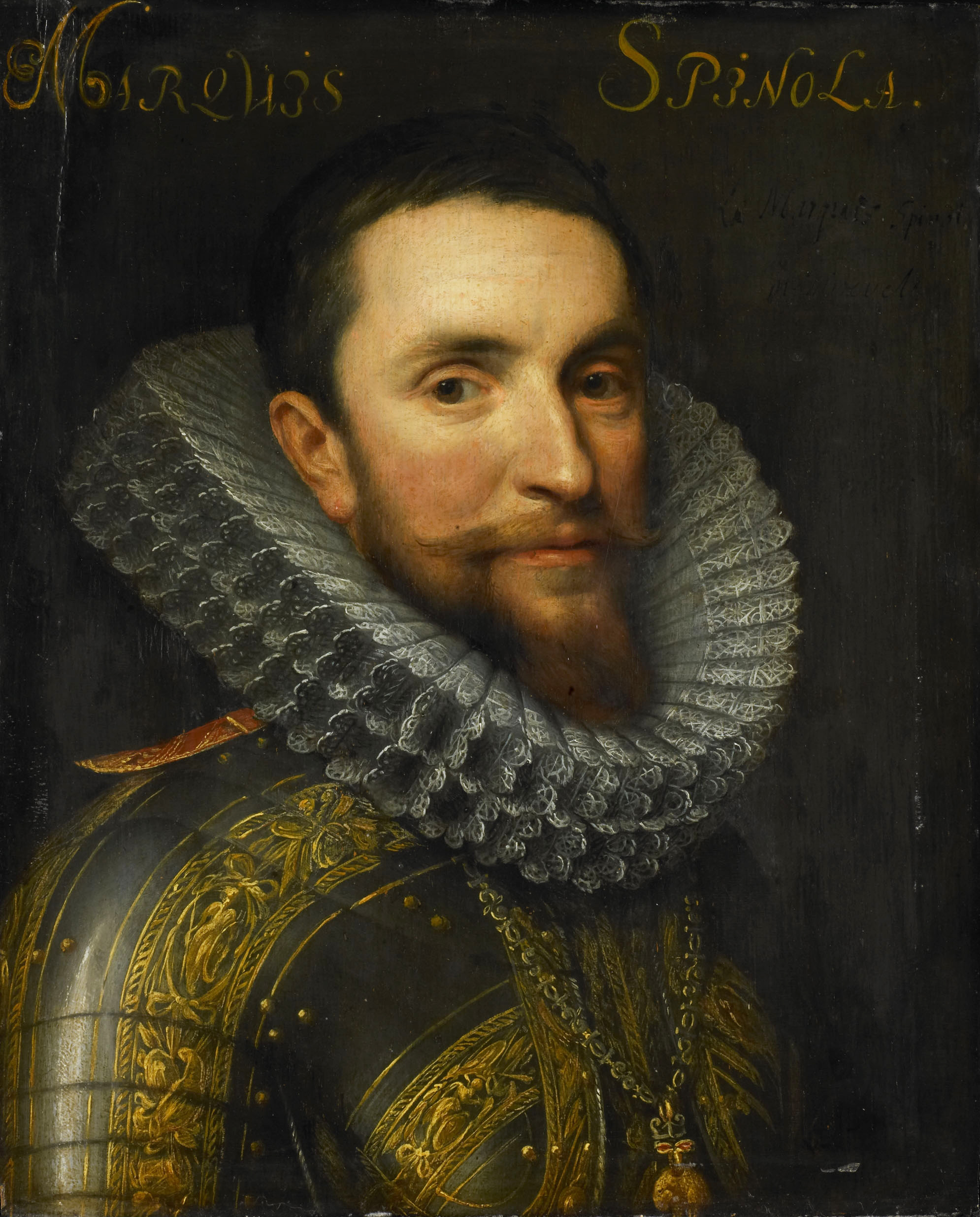
Ambrogio Spinola

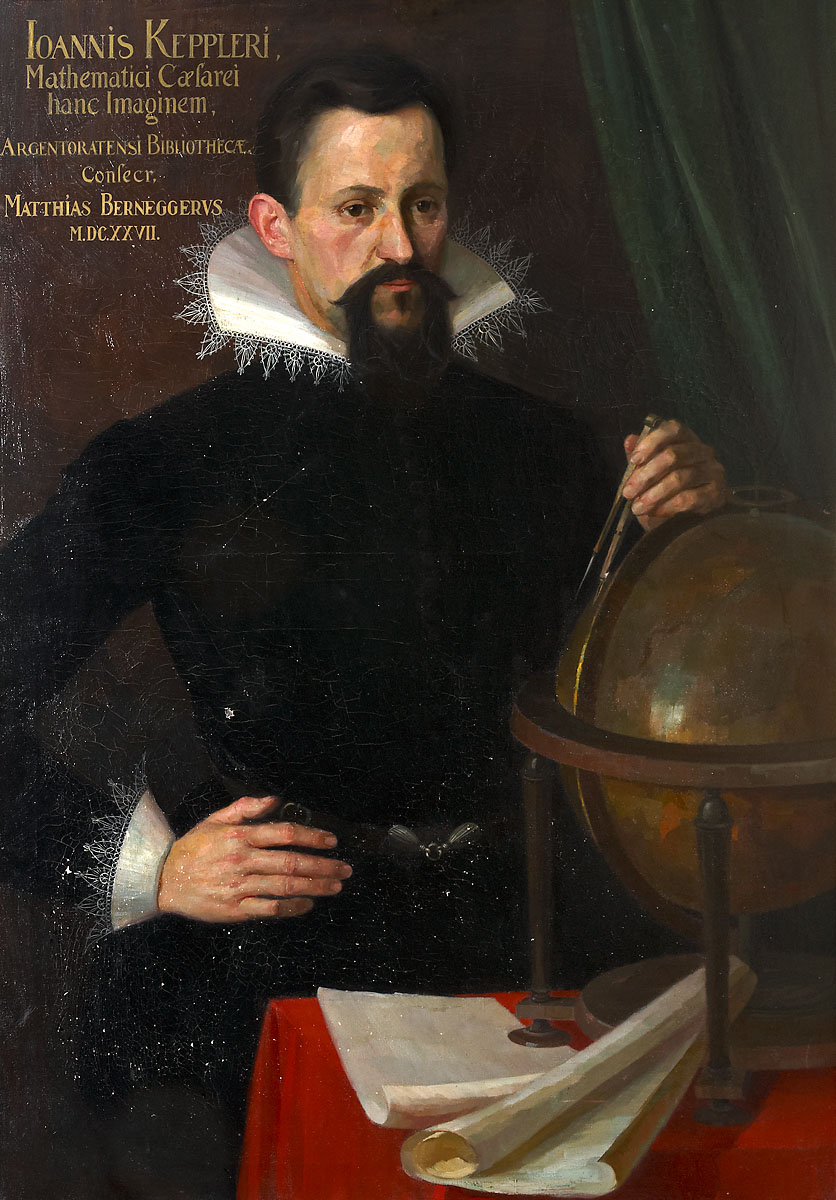
Johannes Kepler

- January 26 – Henry Briggs, English mathematician (b. 1556)
- February 12 – Fynes Moryson, English traveler and writer (b. 1566)
- February 26 – William Brade, English composer (b. 1560)
- April 2 – George Talbot, 9th Earl of Shrewsbury, English earl (b. 1566)
- April 10 – William Herbert, 3rd Earl of Pembroke, English noble, courtier and patron of the arts (b. 1580)
- April 17 – Christian I, Prince of Anhalt-Bernburg, German prince of the House of Ascania (b. 1568)
- April 19 – Anne Howard, Countess of Arundel, English countess and poet (b. 1557)
- April 22 – Agostino Ciampelli, Italian painter (b. 1565)
- April 29 – Agrippa d'Aubigné, French poet and soldier (b. 1552)
- May 17 – Dorothea Flock, German alleged witch (b. 1608)
- May 30 – Emanuel Scrope, 1st Earl of Sunderland, English noble (b. 1584)
- June 25 – Jacob Ulfeldt, Danish politician (b. 1567)
- July 26 – Charles Emmanuel I, Duke of Savoy (b. 1562)
- August 11 – Thomas Walsingham, English spymaster (b. 1561)
- August 22 – Giulio Mancini, Italian papal physician (b. 1559)
- September 5 – Nicolaus Mulerius, Dutch astronomer and medical academic (b. 1564)
- September 17 – Thomas Lake, English statesman (b. 1567)
- September 18 – Melchior Klesl, Austrian cardinal and statesman (b. 1552)
- September 20 – Claudio Saracini, Italian composer (b. 1586)
- September 22 – Yuan Chonghuan, Chinese politician, military general and writer (b. 1584)
- September 24 – Charles Günther, Count of Schwarzburg-Rudolstadt (b. 1576)
- September 25 – Ambrogio Spinola, 1st Marquis of the Balbases, Italian general (b. 1569)
- October 10 – John Heminges, English actor (b. 1566)
- October 22 – Jerónima de la Asunción, Spanish founder of the Monastery of Santa Clara (b. 1555)
- November 15 – Johannes Kepler, German astronomer (b. 1571)
- November 9 – Tōdō Takatora, Japanese daimyo (b. 1556)
- November 18 – Esaias van de Velde, Dutch painter (b. 1587)
- November 19
  - Antonio Brunelli, Italian composer and theorist (b. 1577)
  - Johann Hermann Schein, German composer (b. 1586)
- November 29 – Teodósio II, Duke of Braganza (b. 1568)
- December 11 – Franciscus Dousa, Dutch classical scholar (b. 1577)
- December 19 – Orazio Riminaldi, Italian painter (b. 1593)
- approx. date
  - Adam Haslmayr, Austrian commentator on the Rosicrucian Manifestos (b. c. 1560)
  - Fede Galizia, Italian painter (b. c. 1578)
- unknown date – Mariangiola Criscuolo, Italian painter (b. c. 1548)

1631

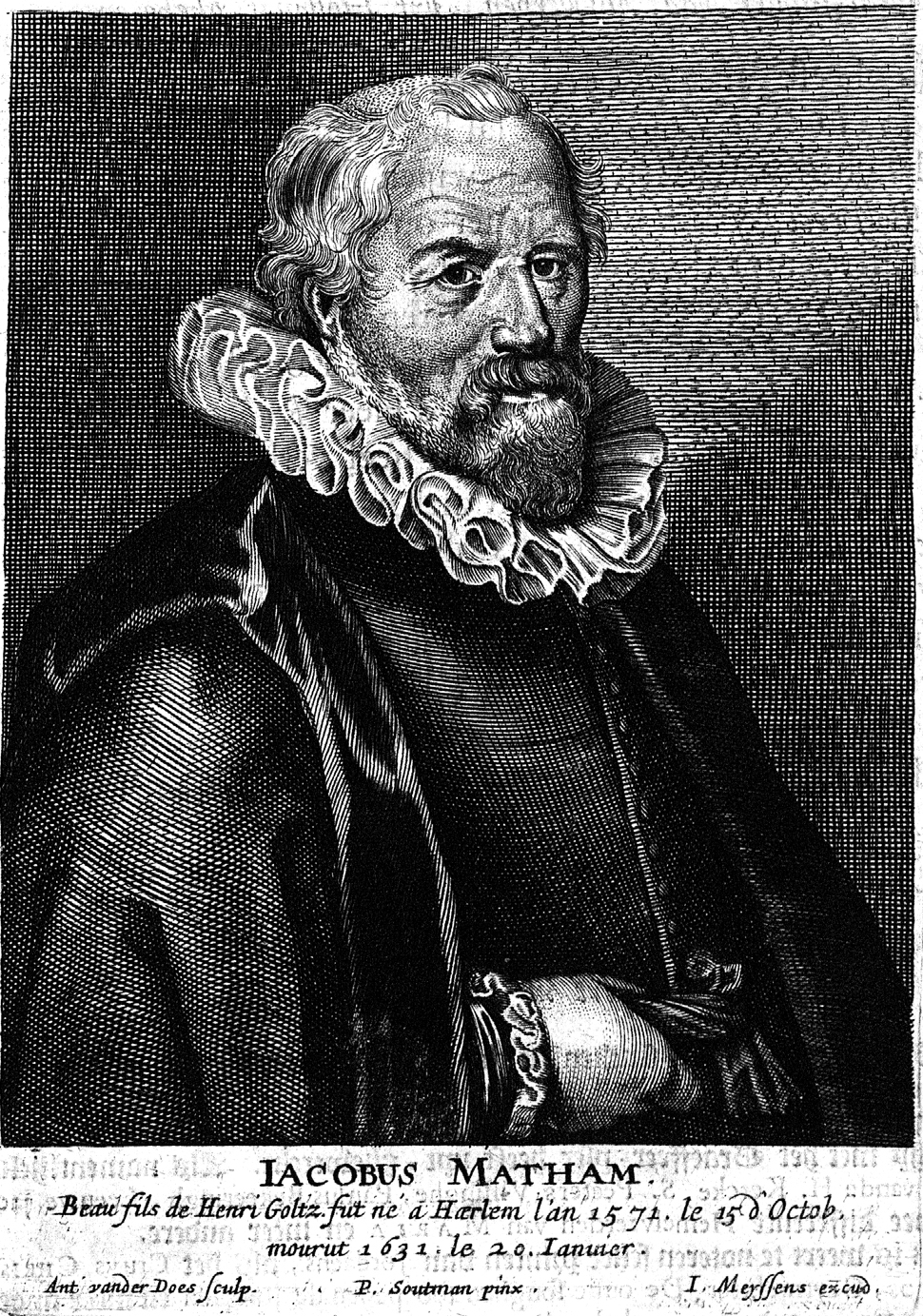
Jacob Matham

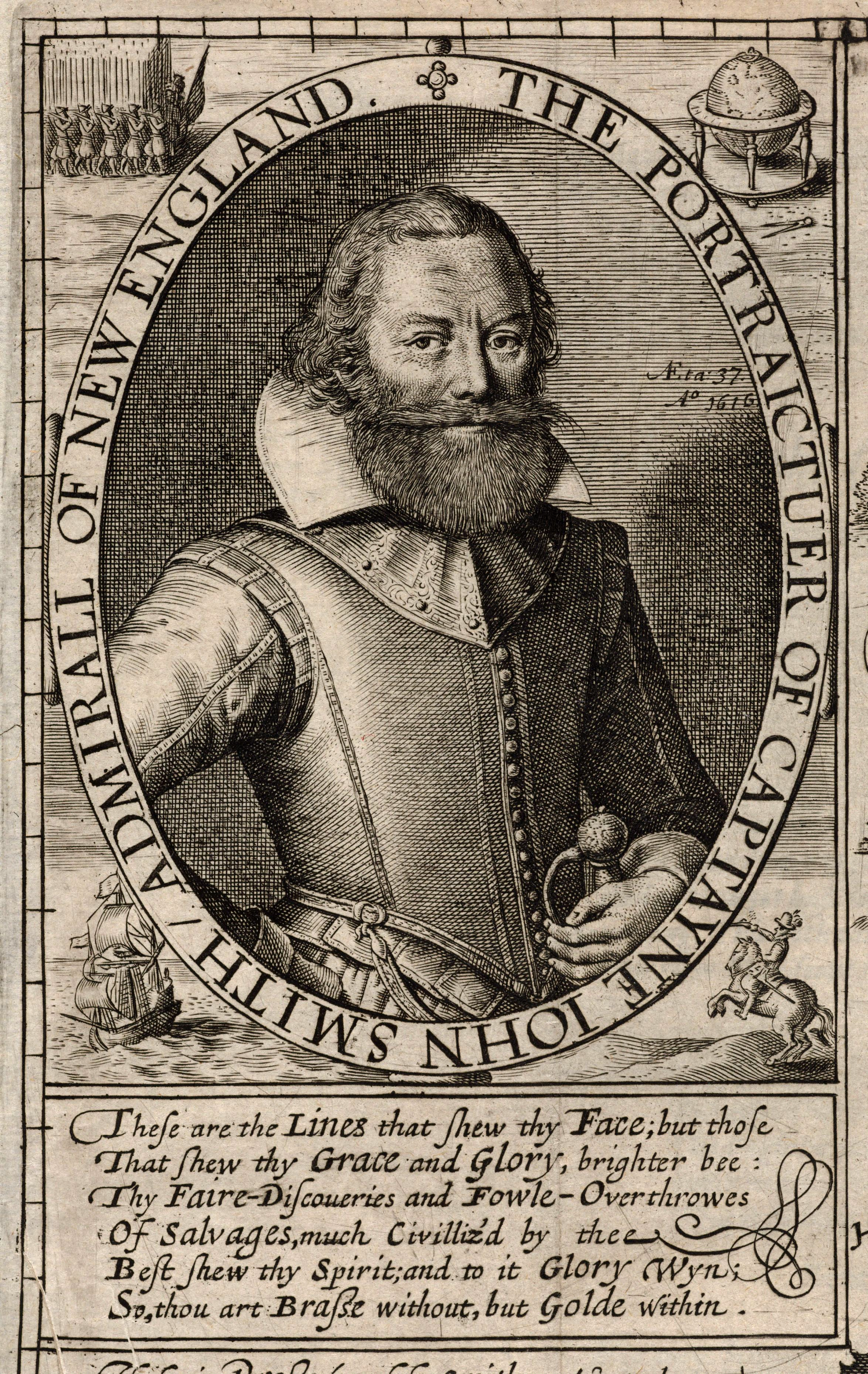
John Smith

- January 1 – Thomas Hobson, English carrier and origin of the phrase "Hobson's choice" (b. 1544)
- January 3 – Michelagnolo Galilei, Italian composer and lutenist, younger brother of Galileo Galilei (b. 1575)
- January 14 – Charlotte of the Palatinate, German noble (b. 1628)
- January 20 – Jacob Matham, Dutch artist (b. 1571)
- January 26 – Louis Frederick, Duke of Württemberg-Montbéliard (1617–1631) (b. 1586)
- January 30 – Sophie Hedwig of Brunswick-Wolfenbüttel, duchess consort of Pomerania-Wolgast (1577–1592) (b. 1561)
- February 7 – Gabriel Harvey, English writer (b. c. 1552/3)
- February 14 – Tsugaru Nobuhira, Japanese daimyō (b. 1586)
- March 24 – Philipp Dulichius, German composer (b. 1562)
- March 31 – John Donne, English writer and prelate (b. 1572)
- March 28 – Juan van der Hamen, Spanish artist (b. 1596)
- April 2 – Nicolò Contarini, Doge of Venice (b. 1553)
- April 5 – Sinibaldo Scorza, Italian painter (b. 1589)
- April 23 – Francesco Maria II della Rovere, last Duke of Urbino (b. 1549)
- May 6 – Sir Robert Cotton, 1st Baronet, of Connington, English politician (b. 1570)
- May 26 – Enrico Caterino Davila, Italian historian and diplomat (b. 1576)
- June 17 – Mumtaz Mahal, favorite wife of Shah Jahan (b. 1593)
- June 18 – Robert Payne, English politician (b. 1573)
- June 21 – John Smith (explorer), English soldier and colonist (b. 1580)
- July 16 – Francis Hay, 9th Earl of Erroll, Scottish noble (b. 1564)
- July 19 – Cesare Cremonini, Italian philosopher (b. 1550)
- July 28 – Guillén de Castro y Bellvis, Spanish dramatist (b. 1569)
- August 3 – Kim Jang-saeng, Korean scholar and writer (b. 1548)
- August 8 – Konstantinas Sirvydas, Lithuanian religious leader (b. 1579)
- September 6 – Honda Tadamasa, Japanese daimyō (b. 1575)
- September 18 – Countess Palatine Dorothea of Simmern (b. 1581)
- September 21 – Federico Borromeo, Cardinal Archbishop of Milan (b. 1564)
- October 14 – Sophie of Mecklenburg-Güstrow, queen and regent of Denmark (b. 1557)
- October 20 – Michael Maestlin, German astronomer and mathematician (b. 1550)
- October 26 – Catherine de Parthenay, French noblewoman and mathematician (b. 1554)
- October 28 – Sir Richard Beaumont, 1st Baronet, English politician (b. 1574)
- November 1 – Archduchess Maria Maddalena of Austria (b. 1589)
- November 7 – Patrick Fleming, Irish Franciscan friar and scholar (murdered) (b. 1599)
- November 29 – Edmond Richer, French theologian (b. 1559)
- December 5 – Tommaso Caracciolo, Field Marshal of Spanish forces in the Thirty Years' War (b. 1572)
- December 7 – Johannes Hartmann, German chemist (b. 1568)
- December 9 – Liborius Wagner, German Roman Catholic priest (b. 1593)
- December 10 – Hugh Myddelton, Welsh businessman (b. 1560)
- December 23 – Michael Drayton, English poet (b. 1563)
- December 30 – Frederick Achilles, Duke of Württemberg-Neuenstadt (b. 1591)

1632

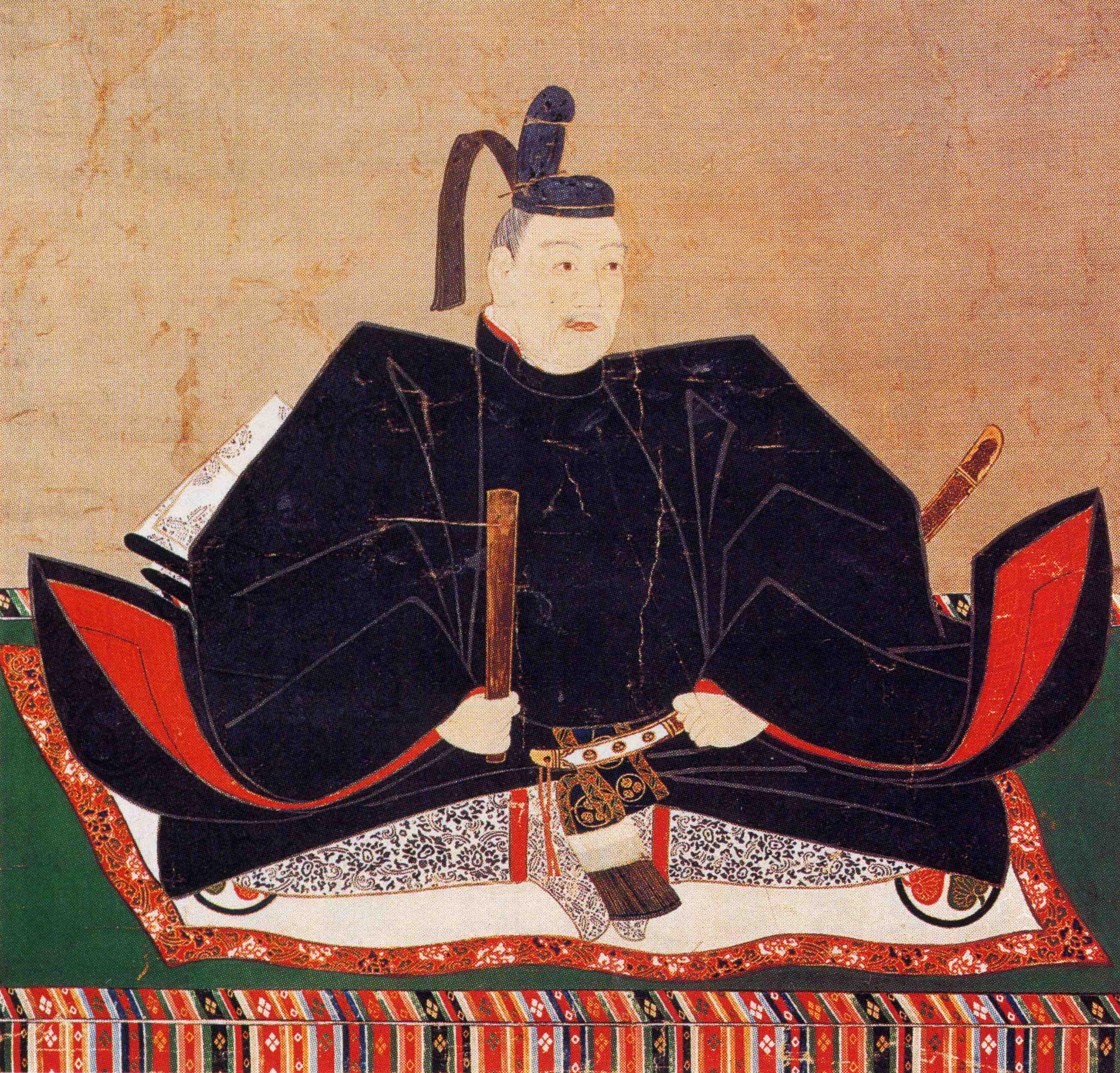
Tokugawa Hidetada

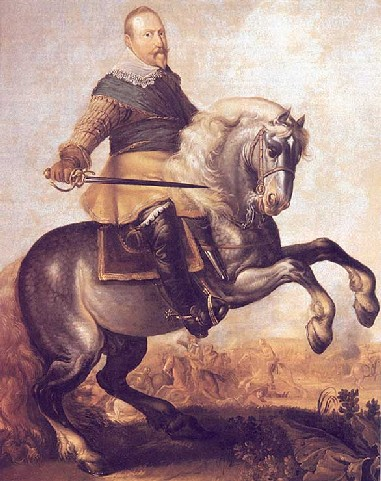
King Gustavus Adolphus of Sweden

- January 1 – Giovanni Battista Agucchi, Italian churchman, papal diplomat and writer on art theory (b. 1570)
- January 31 – Joost Bürgi, Swiss clockmaker and mathematician (b. 1552)
- February 7 – Margherita Gonzaga, Duchess of Lorraine (b. 1591)
- February 10 – Simon Steward, English politician (b. 1575)
- March – Gazi Hüsrev Pasha, Ottoman grand vizier
- March 14 – Tokugawa Hidetada, Japanese shōgun (b. 1579)
- March 15 – Maurice, Landgrave of Hesse-Kassel, German musician (b. 1572)
- April 23 – Sir Drue Drury, 1st Baronet, English politician (b. 1588)
- April 30 – Sigismund III Vasa, King of Sweden (1592–1599) and Poland (1587–1632) (b. 1566)
- April 30 – Johan Tzerclaes, Count of Tilly, Bavarian general (b. 1559)
- May 24 – Robert Hues, English mathematician and geographer (b. 1553)
- May 25 – Adam Tanner, Austrian mathematician and philosopher (b. 1572)
- June 2 – Ernest Casimir I, Count of Nassau-Dietz (1606–1632) and Stadtholder of Groningen, Friesland and Drenthe (1625–1632) (b. 1573)
- June 20 – Miles Hobart, English politician (b. 1595)
- June 22 – James Whitelocke, English judge (b. 1570)
- July 22 – Juan Niño de Tabora, Spanish general and governor of the Philippines (date of birth unknown)
- July 29 – Samuel Ampzing, Dutch linguist and historian (b. 1590)
- July 30 – Archduke Charles of Austria (b. 1607)
- August 13 – Queen Inmok, Korean royal consort (b. 1584)
- August 14 – Augustus, Count Palatine of Sulzbach (b. 1582)
- August 19 – Valentin de Boulogne, French painter (b. 1591)
- August 23 – Frances Carr, Countess of Somerset (b. 1590)
- August 25 – Thomas Dekker, English dramatist (b. c.1572)
- September 13 – Leopold V, Archduke of Austria, regent of Tyrol (b. 1586)
- September 17 – Emperor Susenyos of Ethiopia (b. 1607)
- September 30 – Thomas Allen, English mathematician and astrologer (b. 1542)
- October 6 – Anna of Cleves, Duchess of Jülich-Cleves-Berg and Countess Palatine of Neuburg (b. 1552)
- October 12 – Kutsuki Mototsuna, Japanese samurai commander (b. 1549)
- October 14 – Francis II, Duke of Lorraine (b. 1572)
- October 16 – George More, English politician (b. 1553)
- October 23 – Giovanni Battista Crespi, Italian painter (b. 1573)
- October 30 – Henri II de Montmorency, French naval officer and Governor of Languedoc (b. 1595)
- November 5 – Henry Percy, 9th Earl of Northumberland (b. 1564)
- November 6 – King Gustavus Adolphus of Sweden (in battle) (b. 1594)
- November 9 – Miyake Yasunobu, Japanese daimyō (b. 1563)
- November 17 – Gottfried Heinrich Graf zu Pappenheim, Bavarian field marshal (b. 1594)
- November 21 – Nils Brahe, Swedish soldier and younger brother of Per Brahe (b. 1604)
- November 27 – John Eliot, English statesman (b. 1592)
- November 29 – Frederick V of the Palatinate, briefly King of Bohemia (b. 1596)
- December 2 – Duke Johann Wilhelm of Saxe-Altenburg, colonel in the Saxon Army (b. 1600)
- December 8 – Philippe van Lansberge, Flemish astronomer (b. 1561)
- date unknown
  - Domhnall Spáinneach mac Murchadha Caomhánach, last de facto King of Leinster
  - Zhu Guozhen, Chinese Ming dynasty official, historian and scholar (b. 1557)

1633

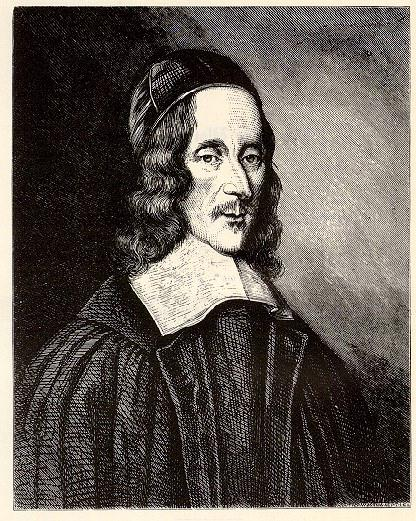
George Herbert

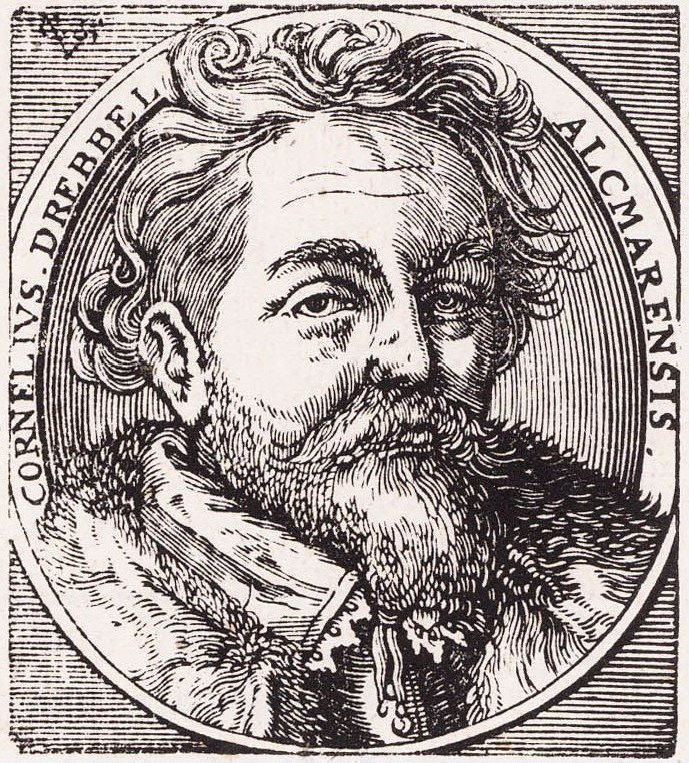
Cornelis Drebbel

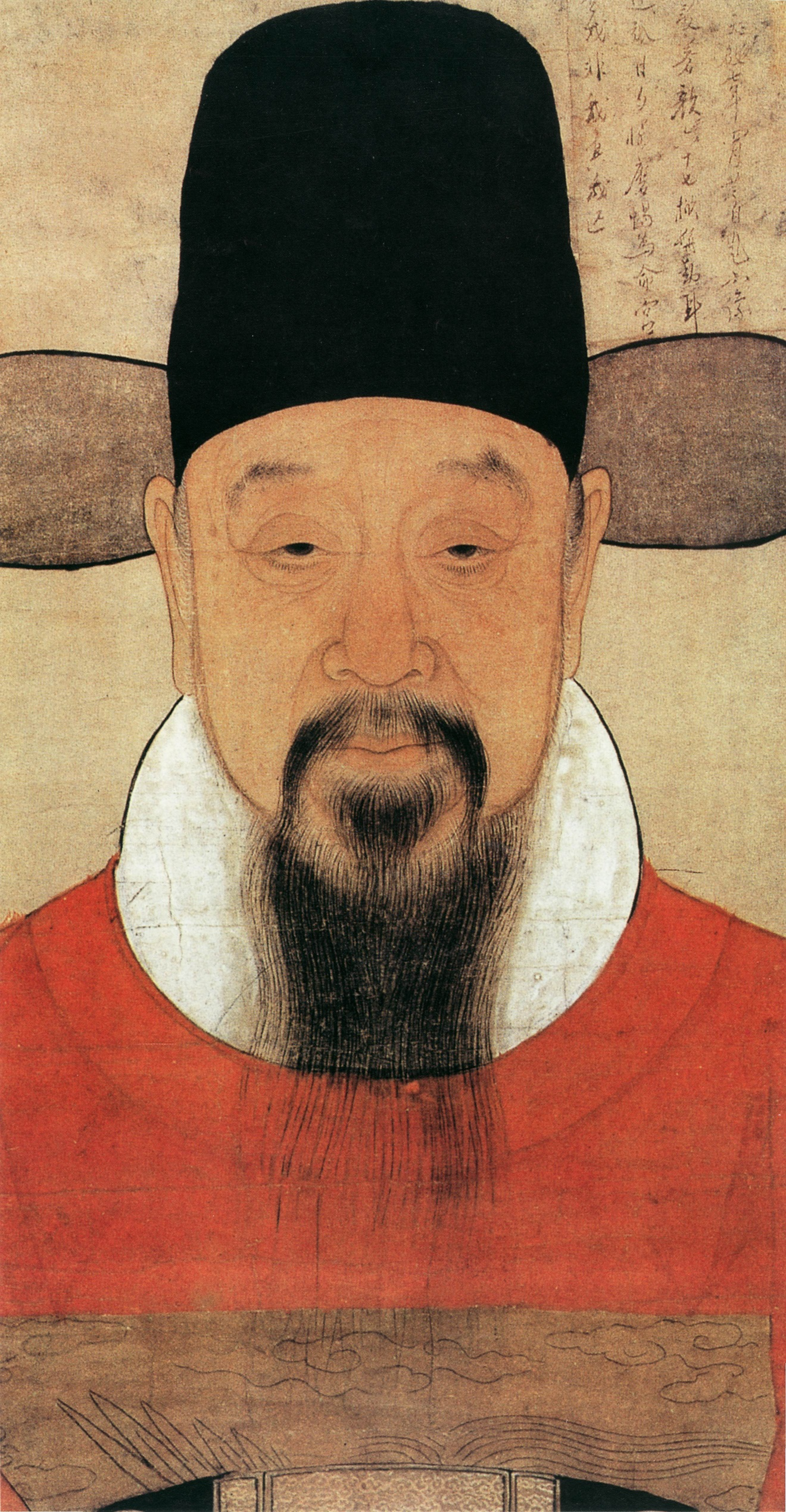
Xu Guangqi

- January 15 – Polykarp Leyser II, German theologian (b. 1586)
- January 20 – Elizabeth Stanley, Countess of Huntingdon, English noblewoman and writer (b. 1588)
- March 1 – George Herbert, English poet and orator (b. 1593)
- March 3 – Magnus Brahe, Swedish noble (b. 1564)
- April 21 – Scipione Dentice, Neapolitan keyboard composer (b. 1560)
- May 5 – Thomas Freke, English politician (b. 1563)
- May 16 – Magdalena of Nassau-Dillenburg, German noblewoman (b. 1547)
- May 21 – Wolfgang Ernst I of Isenburg-Büdingen-Birstein, German count (b. 1560)
- June – Étienne Brûlé, French explorer (b. c. 1592)
- June 11 – Johannes Crellius, Polish–German theologian (b. 1590)
- June 14 – Christian, Duke of Schleswig-Holstein-Sonderburg-Ærø (1622–1633) (b. 1570)
- July 1 – Thomas Robarts, English parliamentarian (b. 1568)
- July 5 – Archduchess Margaret of Austria (b. 1567)
- July 7 – Lew Sapieha, Polish-Lithuanian noble (b. 1557)
- July 16 – John Casimir, Duke of Saxe-Coburg (b. 1564)
- July 22 – Trijntje Keever, Dutchwoman, presumed to have been the tallest woman ever (b. 1616)
- August 5 – George Abbot, Archbishop of Canterbury (b. 1562)
- August 10 – Anthony Munday, English writer (b. 1553)
- August 12
  - Jacopo Peri, Italian composer (b. 1561)
  - Ulrik of Denmark, Danish prince-bishop (b. 1611)
- August 17 – Gertrude More, English nun (b. 1606)
- August 30 – Magdalene of Jülich-Cleves-Berg, Countess Palatine of Pfalz-Zweibrücken (b. 1553)
- September – Henry Cary, 1st Viscount Falkland (b. c. 1575)
- September 4 – Richard Cecil, English politician (b. 1570)
- September 22 – Joam Mattheus Adami, Italian Jesuit missionary (b. 1576)
- September 26 – Bernardino de Almansa Carrión, Spanish Catholic prelate and Archbishop (b. 1579)
- October 2 – Scipione Borghese, Italian Catholic cardinal and art collector (b. 1577)
- October 24 – Jean Titelouze, French organist (b. c.1562)
- October 26 – Horio Tadaharu, Japanese warlord (b. 1596)
- November 3 – Lucio Massari, Italian painter (b. 1569)
- November 7 – Cornelis Drebbel, Dutch inventor (b. 1572)
- November 8
  - Xu Guangqi, Chinese astronomer, Roman Catholic convert, mathematician, scholar, scientist and servant of God (b. 1562)
  - Christian, Duke of Brunswick-Lüneburg, Prince of Lüneburt (1611–1633) (b. 1566)
- November 14 – William Ames, English philosopher (b. 1576)
- December 1 – Infanta Isabella Clara Eugenia of Spain (b. 1566)
- December 8 – Theodoor Galle, Flemish engraver (b. 1571)
- December 12 – Hortensio Félix Paravicino, Spanish preacher and poet from the noble house of Pallavicini (b. 1580)
- December 17 or December 27 – Meletius Smotrytsky, Ruthenian religious activist and author (b. 1577)
- December 28 – Maria Maddalena de' Medici, Italian princess (b. 1600)

1634

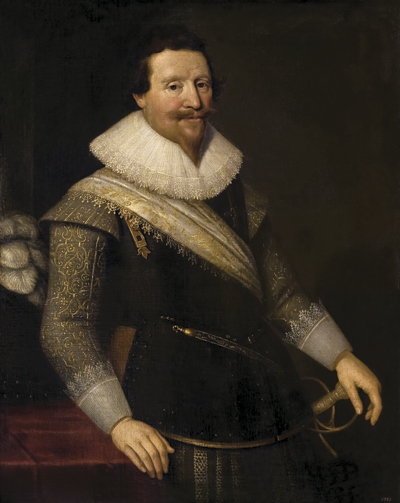
Albrecht von Wallenstein

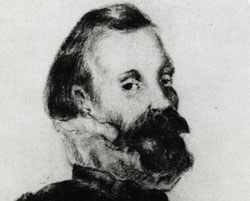
Hendrick Avercamp

- January 17 – Albert Szenczi Molnár, Hungarian translator (b. 1574)
- February 15 – Anna Maria of Ostfriesland, German noblewoman (b. 1601)
- February 25 – Albrecht von Wallenstein, Bohemian general (assassinated) (b. 1583)
- March 23 – Elizabeth Finch, 1st Countess of Winchilsea, English countess (b. 1556)
- April 2 – Maria Celeste, Italian nun, daughter of Galileo Galilei (b. 1600)
- April 8 – Giovanni Srofenaur, Italian musician (b. 1580)
- May 12 – George Chapman, English author (b. c.1559)
- May 15 (bur.) – Hendrick Avercamp, Dutch painter (b. 1585)
- June 22 – Johann von Aldringen, Austrian field marshal (b. 1588)
- June 25 – John Marston, English dramatist (b. 1576)
- July 25 – Francesco de' Medici, Tuscan prince (b. 1614)
- August 9 – William Noy, English jurist (b. 1577)
- August 11 – Frederick Ulrich, Duke of Brunswick-Lüneburg (b. 1591)
- August 18 – Urbain Grandier, French priest (b. 1590)
- September 3 – Edward Coke, English colonial entrepreneur and jurist (b. 1552)
- September 6 – Frederick III, Margrave of Brandenburg-Ansbach (b. 1616)
- September 26 – Dorothea of Anhalt-Zerbst, Duchess of Brunswick-Wolfenbüttel (b. 1607)
- October 6 – Otto Louis of Salm-Kyrburg-Mörchingen, Swedish general in the Thirty Years' War (b. 1597)
- October 8 – Francis Julius of Saxe-Lauenburg, Prince (b. 1584)
- October 19 – Agnes of Jesus, French Catholic nun (b. 1602)
- November 11 - Saint Marina of Omura, Japanese Dominican tertiary and one of the 16 Martyrs of Japan
- November 14 – Sophia of Holstein-Gottorp, Regent of Mecklenburg-Schwerin (1603–1608) (b. 1569)
- November 19 – Alexander Charles Vasa, 5th son of King Sigismund III Vasa (b. 1614)
- November 20 – Anna Maria of Solms-Sonnewalde, Countess consort of Hohenlohe-Langenburg (b. 1585)
- December 7 - Đào Duy Từ, Vietnamese scholar, poet, military adviser, and mandarin under Nguyễn lord Nguyễn Phúc Nguyên
- December 11 – Fadrique de Toledo, 1st Marquis of Villanueva de Valdueza, Spanish noble and admiral (b. 1580)
- December 25
  - Count Walter Butler, Irish immigrant living in Germany (b. 1600s)
  - Lettice Knollys, English noblewoman (b. 1543)
- December 29 – John Albert Vasa, Polish bishop (b. 1612)
- date unknown
  - Adriano Banchieri, Italian composer (b. 1568)
  - Johan Bara, Dutch painter, engraver (b. c. 1581)

1635

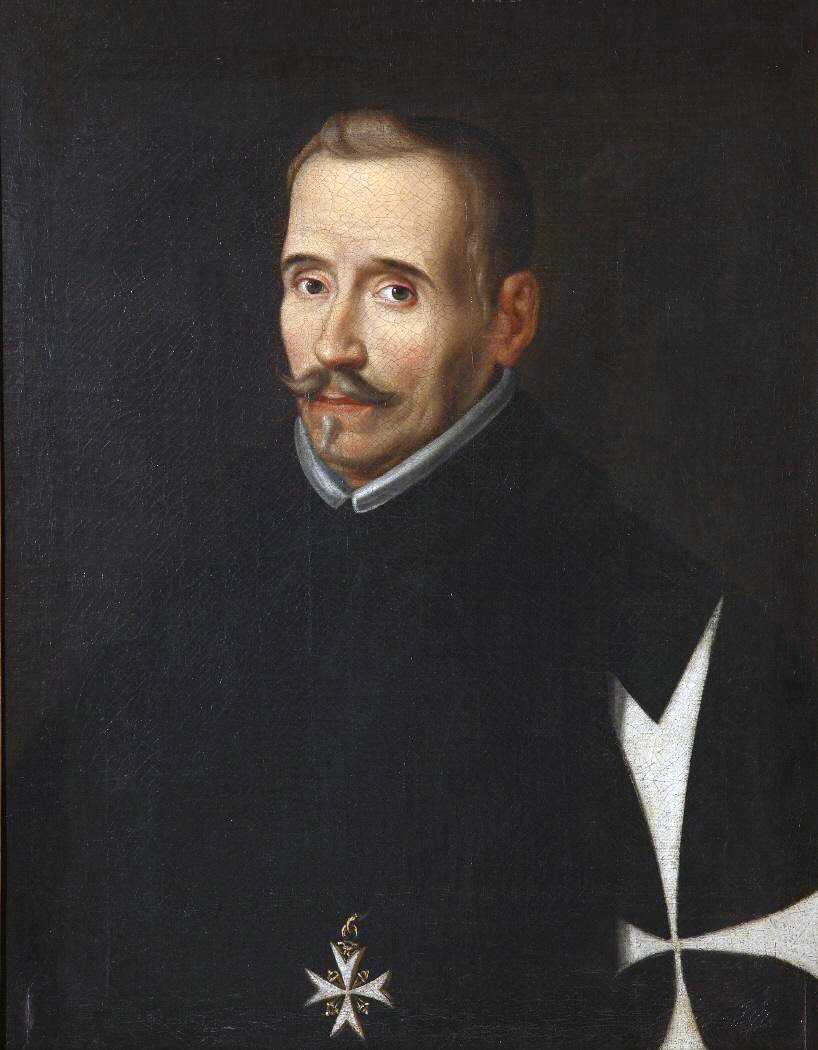
Lope de Vega

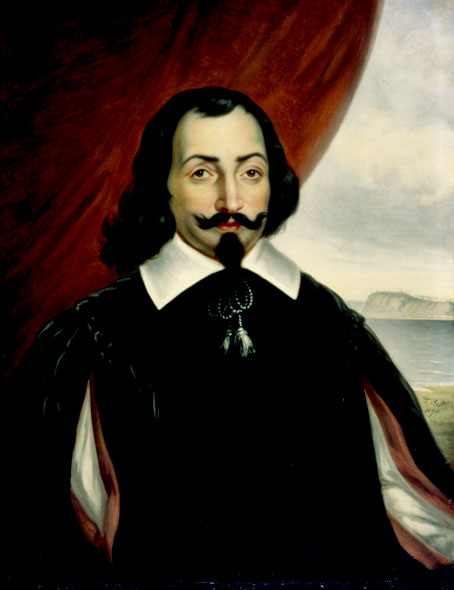
Samuel de Champlain

- January – Nef'i, Turkish poet and satirist (b. 1572)
- January 16 – Mariana de Jesús Torres, Spanish nun and mystic (b. 1563)
- February 19 – Franco Burgersdijk, Dutch logician (b. 1590)
- March – Thomas Randolph, English poet (b. 1605)
- March 27 – Robert Naunton, English politician (b. 1563)
- March 28 – Patrick Forbes, bishop in the Church of Scotland (b. 1564)
- April 13 – Fakhr-al-Din II, Ottoman Emir of Chouf (b. 1572)
- April 21 – Maria Musch, Dutch shipowner
- April 23 – Elizabeth Carey, Lady Berkeley, English courtier (b. 1576)
- April 25
  - Alessandro Tassoni, Italian poet and writer (b. 1565)
  - Julius Frederick, Duke of Württemberg-Weiltingen (b. 1588)
- April 27
  - Antonio Zapata y Cisneros, Spanish Catholic cardinal (b. 1550)
  - Wolfgang Ratke, German educational reformer (b. 1571)
- July 10 – Alonso Jerónimo de Salas Barbadillo, Spanish novelist and dramatist (b. c. 1580)
- August (bur.) – Richard Whitbourne, English colonist of Newfoundland (b. 1561)
- August 7 – Friedrich von Spee, German writer (b. 1591)
- August 9 – John II, Count Palatine of Zweibrücken (b. 1584)
- August 27 – Lope de Vega, Spanish poet and playwright (b. 1562)
- September 6 – Metius, Dutch mathematician and astronomer (b. 1571)
- September 10 – Johann Faulhaber, German mathematician (b. 1580)
- October 10 – Johann Ulrich Steigleder, German composer (b. 1593)
- October 24 – Wilhelm Schickard, German inventor (b. 1592)
- October 31 – Maria Amalia of Nassau-Dillenburg, German noble (b. 1582)
- November 5 – Jobst Herman, Count of Schaumburg (b. 1593)
- November 15 – Thomas Parr, English alleged oldest living man (b. 1483)
- November 25 – John Hall, English physician, son-in-law of William Shakespeare (b. 1575)
- December 1 – Melchior Teschner, German cantor, composer and theologian (b. 1584)
- December 9 – Sophie of Saxony, Duchess of Pomerania (b. 1587)
- December 19 – Albrecht of Hanau-Münzenberg, German nobleman (b. 1579)
- December 23 – Henry II, Count of Reuss-Gera (b. 1572)
- December 25 – Samuel de Champlain, French explorer and founder of Quebec (b. c.1567)
- date unknown
  - Iravikkutti Pillai, Venad leader in India (b. 1603)
  - Urszula Meyerin, politically influential Polish courtier (b. 1570)
- probable – Anthony Shirley, English traveller (b. 1565)

1636

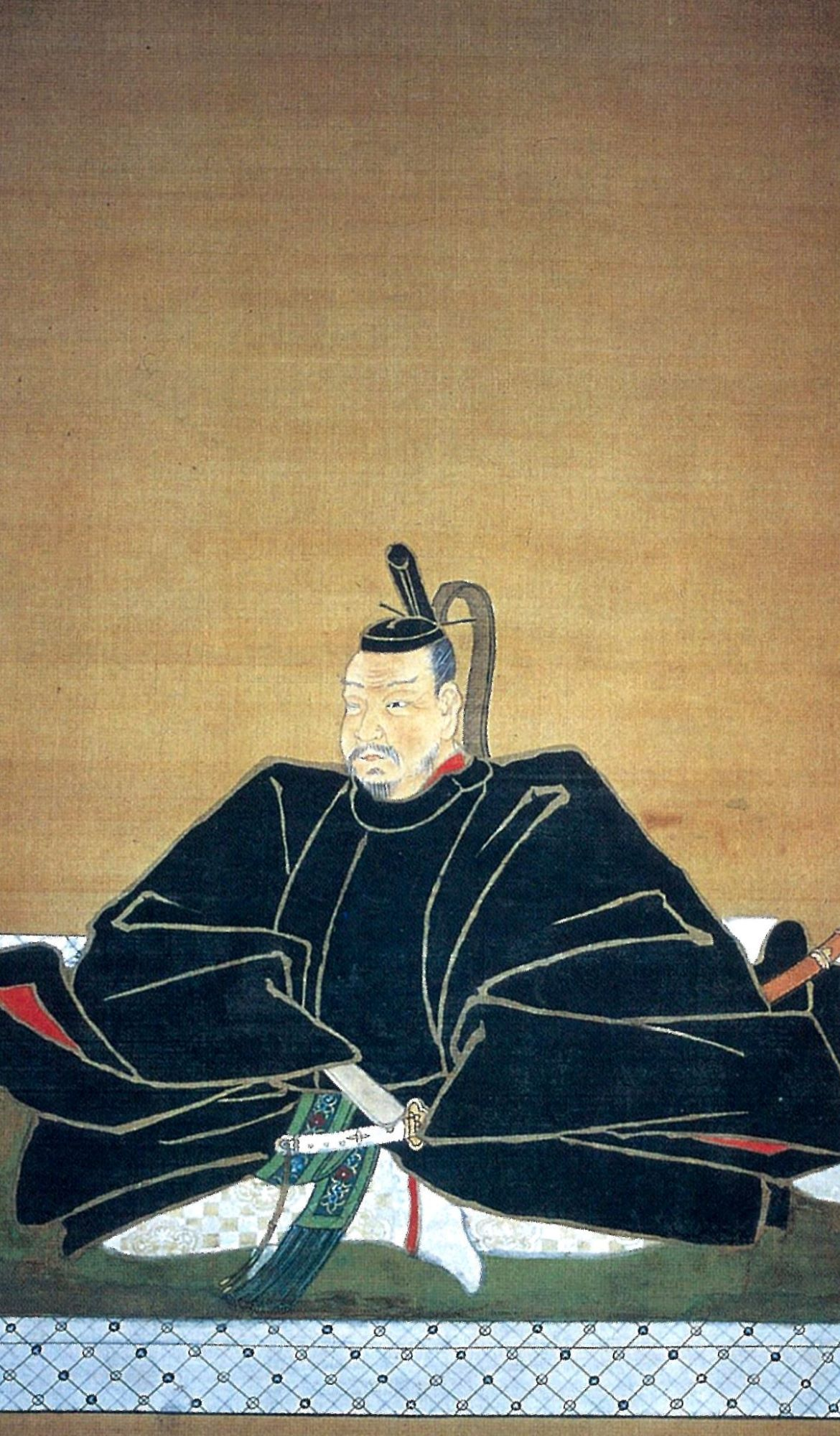
Date Masamune

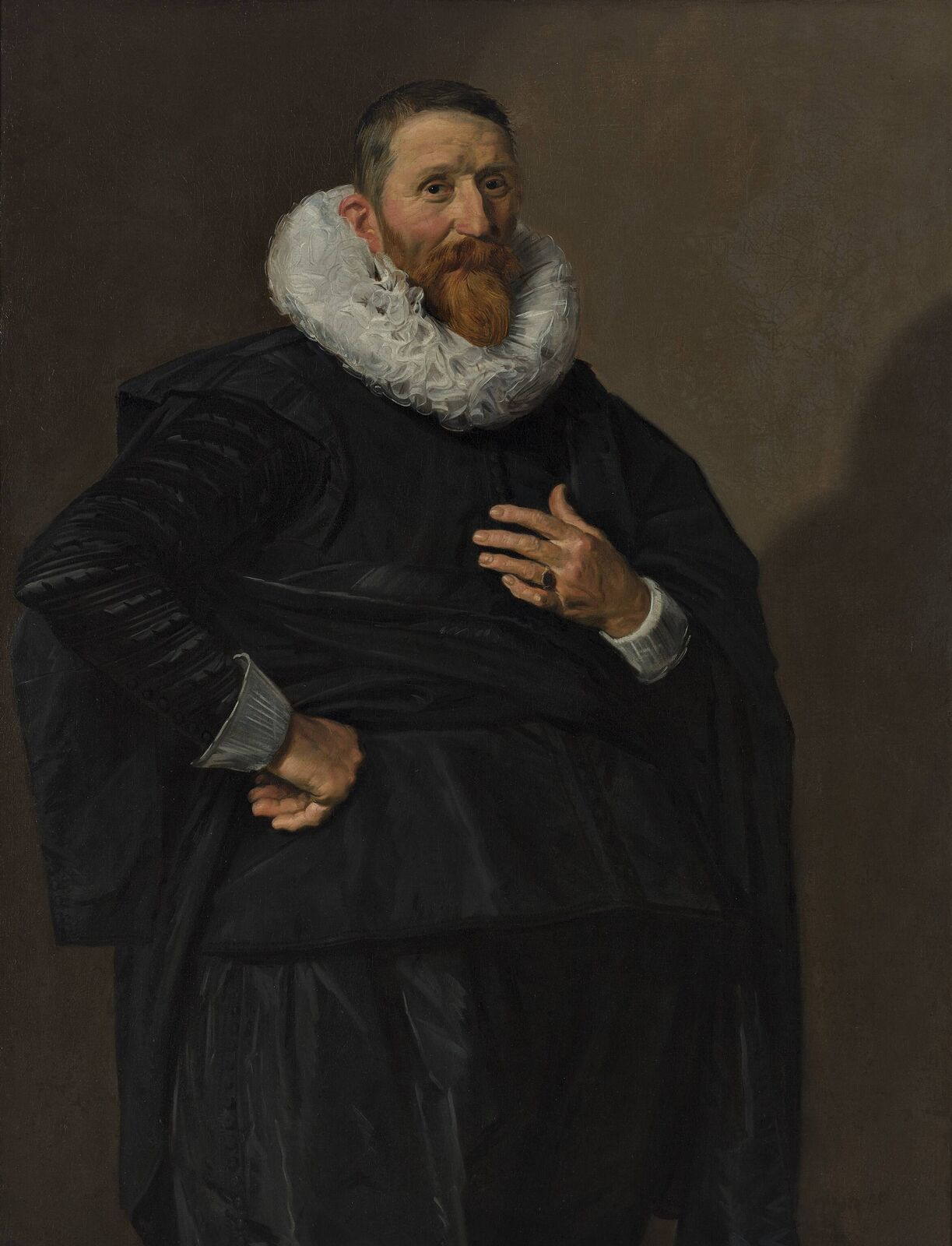
Johannes Saeckma

- January 11 – Dodo Knyphausen, Swedish military leader (b. 1583)
- January 16 – Queen Inyeol, Korean royal consort (b. 1594)
- January 19 – Daniel Schwenter, German Orientalist (b. 1585)
- January 26 – Jean Hotman, Marquis de Villers-St-Paul, French diplomat (b. 1552)
- February 13 – Barbara Sophie of Brandenburg, duchess consort and later regent of Württemberg (b. 1584)
- February 16 – Tokuhime, Japanese noble (b. 1559)
- February 22 – Santorio Santorio, Italian physician (b. 1561)
- March 11 – Christoph Grienberger, Austrian astronomer (b. 1561)
- March 24 – Johanna Sibylla of Hanau-Lichtenberg, countess consort of Wied-Runkel and Isenburg (b. 1564)
- April 6 – Philipp Uffenbach, German artist (b. 1566)
- April 18 – Julius Caesar, English judge (b. c.1557)
- April 23 – John Albert II, Duke of Mecklenburg (b. 1590)
- May 23 – Agatha Marie of Hanau, German noblewoman (b. 1599)
- June 7 – Frederik Coning, Dutch member of the Haarlem schutterij (b. 1594)
- June 9 – Antoine de Paule, French-born 56th Grandmaster of the Knights Hospitaller (b. c.1551)
- June 13 – George Gordon, 1st Marquess of Huntly, Scottish politician (b. 1562)
- June 21 – Justus de Harduwijn, Dutch Catholic priest and poet (b. 1582)
- June 27 – Date Masamune, Japanese daimyō (b. 1567)
- July – Elijah Loans, rabbi and kabbalist (b. 1555)
- July 20 – Albrycht Władysław Radziwiłł, Polish prince (b. 1589)
- August 6 – Countess Katharina of Hanau-Lichtenberg (b. 1568)
- August 8 – Simon Louis, Count of Lippe-Detmolt (1627–1636) (b. 1610)
- August 25 – Bhai Gurdas, Sikh religious figure (b. 1551)
- September 6 – Paul Stockmann, German hymnwriter (b. 1603)
- September 17 – Stefano Maderno, Italian sculptor (b. 1576)
- September 19 – Franz von Dietrichstein, German Catholic bishop (b. 1570)
- October 1 – Augustus the Elder, Duke of Brunswick-Lüneburg, Lutheran Bishop of Ratzeburg (b. 1568)
- October 11 – Johann Albrecht Adelgrief, German self-proclaimed prophet who was executed for witchcraft
- October 19
  - Marcin Kazanowski, Polish military leader (b. c. 1564)
  - Hugh Hamersley, Lord Mayor of London, England (1627–1628) (b. 1565)
- December 9
  - Fabian Birkowski, Polish writer (b. 1566)
  - Giovanni da San Giovanni, Italian painter (b. 1592)
- December 10 – Randal MacDonnell, 1st Earl of Antrim, Irish leader
- December 19 – William Spencer, 2nd Baron Spencer of Wormleighton, British baron (b. 1591)
- December 22 – Johannes Saeckma, Dutch Golden Age magistrate (b. 1572)
- December 27 – Iskandar Muda, Sultan of Aceh (b. 1583)
- date unknown – Euphrosina Heldina von Dieffenau; German-Swedish courtier
  - Louise Bourgeois Boursier, French Royal midwife (b. 1563)

1637

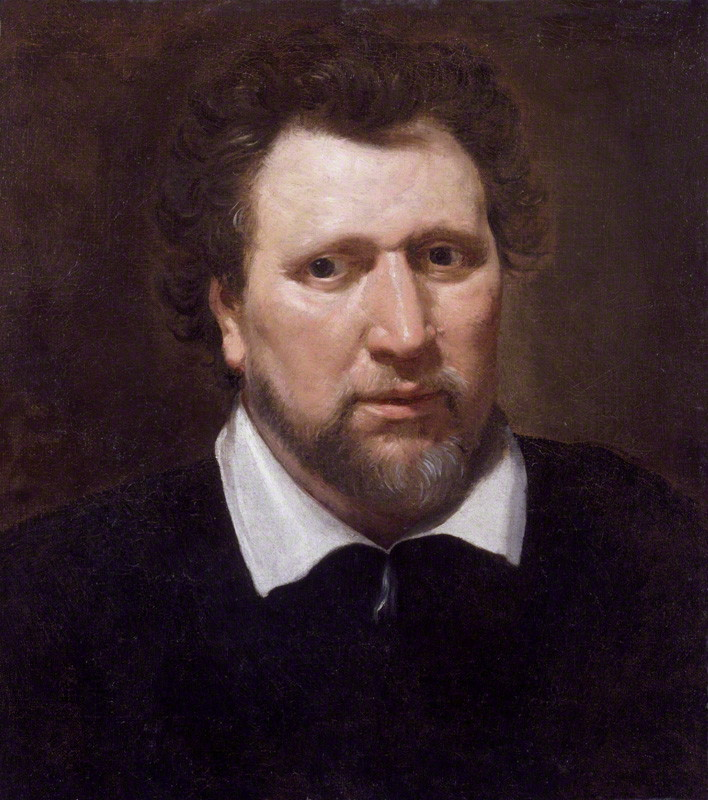
Ben Jonson

- January 23 – Alice Spencer, Countess of Derby, Baroness Ellesmere and Viscountess Brackley (b. 1559)
- February 15 – Ferdinand II, Holy Roman Emperor (b. 1578)
- March 10 – Bogislaw XIV, Duke of Pomerania (b. 1580)
- March 12
  - Cornelius a Lapide, Flemish Jesuit exegete (b. 1567)
  - Anders Arrebo, Danish writer (b. 1587)
- March 19 – Péter Pázmány, Hungarian cardinal and statesman (b. 1570)
- April 3 – Joseph Yuspa Nördlinger Hahn, German rabbi
- April 4 – Fernando Afán de Ribera, duke of Alcalá de los Gazules, Spanish diplomat (b. 1583)
- April 30 – Niwa Nagashige, Japanese warlord (b. 1571)
- May 2 – Chamaraja Wodeyar VI, King of Mysore (b. 1603)
- May 5 – William Petre, 2nd Baron Petre, English peer and MP (b. 1575)
- May 19 – Isaac Beeckman, Dutch scientist and philosopher (b. 1588)
- May 29 – Jiří Třanovský, Czech priest and musician (b. 1592)
- June 6 – Pieter Huyssens, Flemish architect (b. 1577)
- June 24 – Nicolas-Claude Fabri de Peiresc, French astronomer (b. 1580)
- July 1 – Christopher von Dohna, German politician and scholar (b. 1583)
- July 21 – Daniel Sennert, German physician, chemist (b. 1572)
- July 28 – Johann Christoph von Westerstetten, German bishop (b. 1563)
- August 6 – Ben Jonson, English writer (b. 1572)
- August 17 – Johann Gerhard, German Lutheran leader (b. 1582)
- August 27 – Princess Catherine Beatrice of Savoy, daughter of the Duke of Savoy (b. 1636)
- September 8 – Robert Fludd, English mystic (b. 1574)
- September 9 – Louise de Bourbon, French noble (b. 1603)
- September 14
  - Theodoor Rombouts, Flemish painter (b. 1597)
  - Pierre Vernier, French mathematician (b. 1580)
- September 21 – William V, Landgrave of Hesse-Kassel (b. 1602)
- September 22 – Charles Gonzaga, Duke of Mantua and Montferrat (b. 1580)
- September 27 – Lorenzo Ruiz, Filipino saint (b. c.1600)
- October 5 – Daniel Cramer, German theologian (b. 1568)
- October 7 – Victor Amadeus I, Duke of Savoy (b. 1587)
- October 16 – Johann Rudolf Stadler, Swiss clock-maker (b. 1605)
- October 21 – Laurens Reael, Dutch admiral (b. 1583)
- October 27 – Robert Caesar, English politician (b. 1602)
- November 26
  - Andries de Witt, Grand Pensionary of Holland (b. 1573)
  - Humilis of Bisignano, Italian Franciscan friar and saint (b. 1582)
- December 4 – Nicholas Ferrar, English trader (b. 1592)
- December 19 – Christina of Lorraine, Tuscan regent (b. 1565)
- December 24 – Juan López de Agurto de la Mata, Spanish Catholic prelate (b. 1572)
- December 27 – Vincenzo Giustiniani, Italian banker (b. 1564)
- December 31 – Christian, Count of Waldeck-Wildungen (1588–1637) (b. 1585)

1638

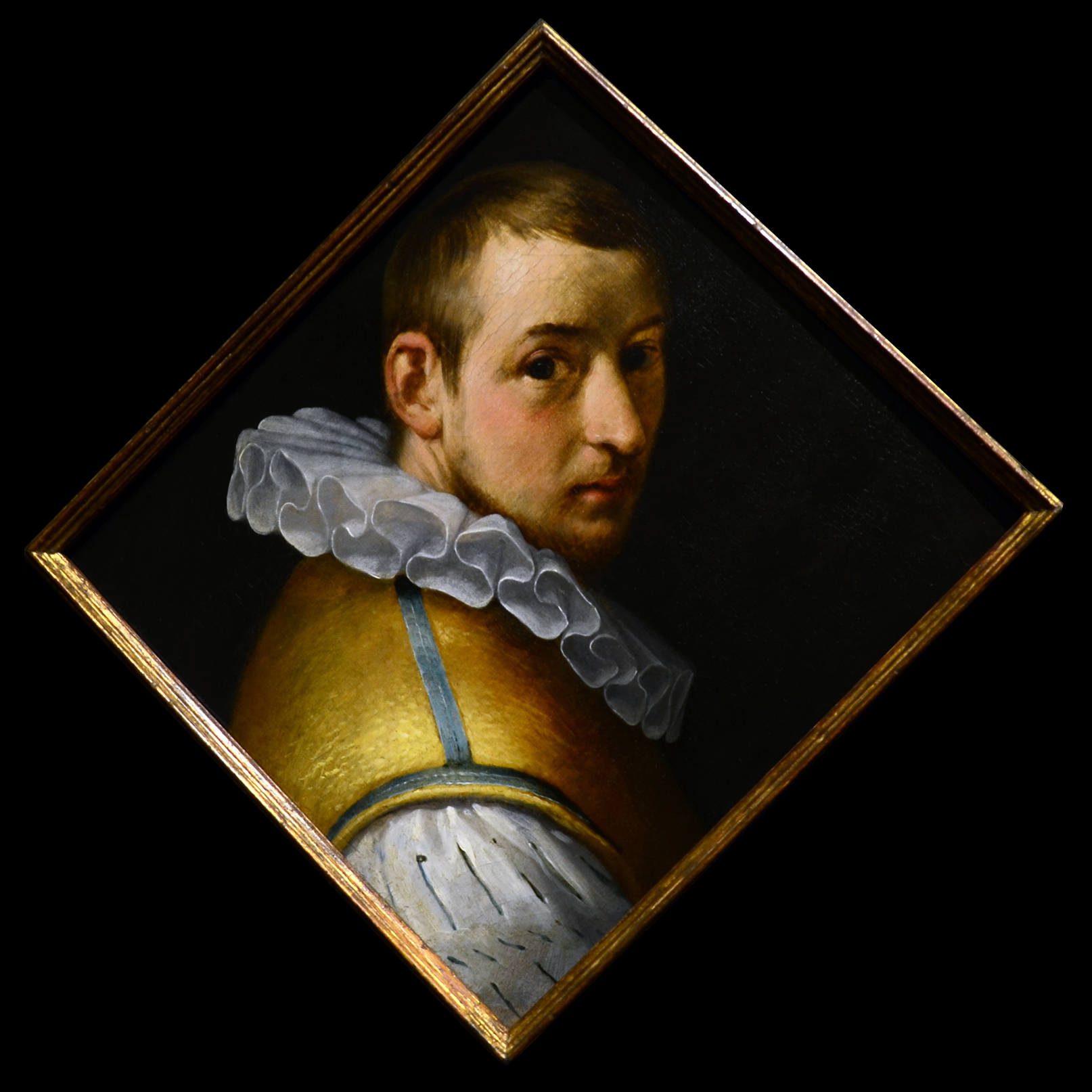
Cornelis van Haarlem

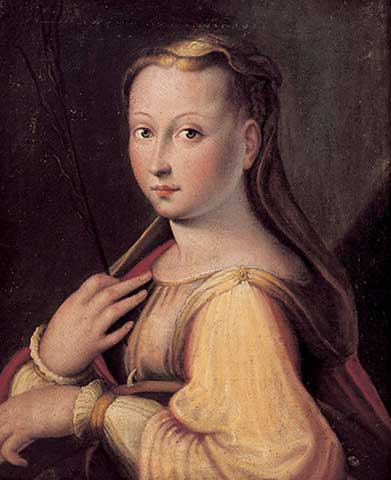
Barbara Longhi

- January 21 – Ignazio Donati, Italian composer (b. c. 1570)
- January 27 – Gonzalo de Céspedes y Meneses, Spanish novelist (b. c. 1585)
- February 26 – Claude Gaspard Bachet de Méziriac, French mathematician (b. 1581)
- March 2 – William Spring of Pakenham, English Member of Parliament (b. 1588)
- March 22 – Johann, Prince of Hohenzollern-Sigmaringen (b. 1578)
- April 1 – Henry Ley, 2nd Earl of Marlborough, English politician (b. 1595)
- April 7 – Shimazu Tadatsune, Japanese ruler of Satsuma (b. 1576)
- April 13 – Henri, Duke of Rohan, French Huguenot leader (b. 1579)
- April 19 – Jeremias Drexel, Jesuit writer and professor of rhetoric (b. 1581)
- April 26 – Margareta Brahe, Swedish political activist (b. 1564)
- May 6
  - Cornelius Jansen, French bishop and religious reformer (b. 1585)
  - Gaj Singh of Marwar, Raja of Marwar Kingdom (b. 1595)
- May 9 – Frederick I, Landgrave of Hesse-Homburg (b. 1585)
- May 27 – Pietro Paolo Floriani, Italian architect (b. 1585)
- June 25 – Juan Pérez de Montalbán, Spanish writer (b. 1602)
- July 27 – John VIII, Count of Nassau-Siegen (b. 1583)
- July 31 – Sibylla Schwarz, German poet (b. 1621)
- August 3 – Philipp Moritz, Count of Hanau-Münzenberg, German noble (b. 1605)
- August 10 – Anton Henry, Count of Schwarzburg-Sondershausen (1586–1638) (b. 1571)
- August 12 – Baltasar Marradas, Spanish count (b. 1560)
- August 13 – Carolus Mulerius, Dutch Hispanist (b. 1601)
- August 27 – John Hoskins, English poet (b. 1566)
- September – Christoph Besold, German jurist (b. 1577)
- September 5 – Dorothea of Hanau-Münzenberg, German noblewoman (b. 1556)
- September 14 – John Harvard, American clergyman (b. 1607)
- September 24 – Georg Friedrich, Margrave of Baden-Durlach (1604–1622) (b. 1573)
- October 6 – Jacob Dircksz de Graeff, Dutch mayor (b. 1579)
- October 4 – Francis Hyacinth, Duke of Savoy (b. 1632)
- October 8 – Raja Wodeyar II, King of Mysore (b. 1612)
- October 14 – Gabriello Chiabrera, Italian poet (b. 1552)
- October 23 – John Ernest, Duke of Saxe-Eisenach, German duke (b. 1566)
- October 28 – Robert Petre, 3rd Baron Petre, English baron (b. 1599)
- November 9 – Johann Heinrich Alsted, German theologian (b. 1588)
- November 11 – Cornelis Corneliszoon van Haarlem, Dutch painter (b. 1562)
- November 16 – Edward Cecil, 1st Viscount Wimbledon, English noble (b. 1572)
- November 19 – Lelio Biscia, Italian Catholic cardinal (b. 1575)
- November 27
  - Redemptus of the Cross, Portuguese Carmelite lay brother and martyr (b. 1598)
  - Denis of the Nativity, French sailor and cartographer (b. 1600)
- December 8 – Ivan Gundulić, Croatian poet (b. 1589)
- December 13 – Catherine of Sweden, Countess Palatine of Kleeburg (b. 1584)
- December 17 – François Leclerc du Tremblay, French Greyfriar (b. 1577)
- December 23 – Barbara Longhi, Italian painter (b. 1552)

1639

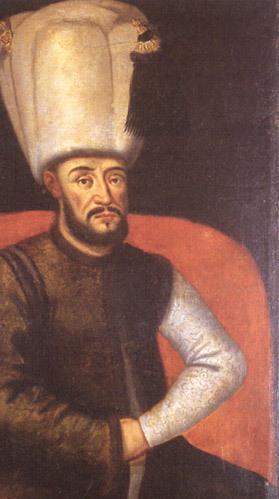
Mustafa I

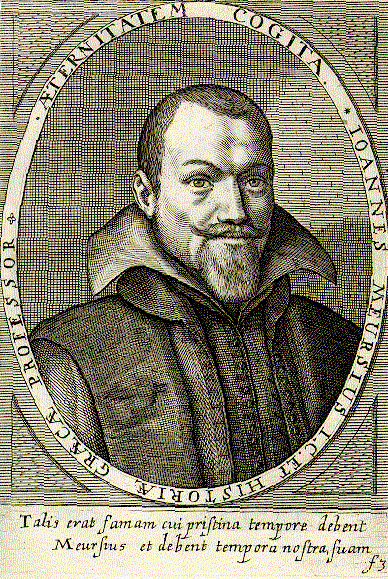
Johannes Meursius

- January – Shackerley Marmion, English dramatist (b. 1603)
- January 14 – Sophie of Brunswick-Lüneburg, Margrave of Brandenburg-Ansbach and Brandenburg-Kulmbach, Duchess of Hunters Village (b. 1563)
- January 20 – Mustafa I, Ottoman Sultan (b. 1592)
- January 23 – Francisco Maldonado da Silva, Peruvian Jewish poet (b. 1592)
- January 24 – Georg Jenatsch, Swiss politician (b. 1596)
- February 5 – Augusta of Denmark, Duchess Consort of Holstein-Gottorp (b. 1580)
- March 16 – Pieter de Neyn, Dutch painter (b. 1597)
- April 1 – Johann Philipp, Duke of Saxe-Altenburg, German Duke (b. 1597)
- April 2 – Nicolaes Olycan, Dutch businessman (b. 1599)
- April 6
  - Berlinghiero Gessi, Italian Catholic cardinal (b. 1563)
  - John Matthew Rispoli, major Maltese philosopher of great erudition (b. 1582)
- April 9 – Albret Skeel, State Admiral of Denmark (b. 1572)
- May 13 – Peter Lauremberg, German writer and professor (b. 1585)
- May 21 – Tommaso Campanella, Italian theologian and poet (b. 1568)
- June 1 – Melchior Franck, German composer (b. c. 1579)
- June 6 – Peter Crüger, German astronomer and mathematician (b. 1580)
- July 18 – Bernard of Saxe-Weimar, German general (b. 1604)
- August 4 – Juan Ruiz de Alarcón, Mexican dramatist (b. c. 1571)
- August 6 – Hans van Steenwinckel the Younger, Danish architect (b. 1587)
- August 20 – Martin Opitz von Boberfeld, German poet (b. 1597)
- August 21 – Henry Wenceslaus, Duke of Oels-Bernstadt, Duke of Bernstadt (1617–1639) (b. 1592)
- September 20 – Johannes Meursius, Dutch classical scholar (b. 1579)
- September 28 – Louis de Nogaret de La Valette, French Catholic Cardinal (b. 1593)
- October 8 – Frances Howard, Duchess of Richmond, British duchess (b. 1578)
- October 28 – Stefano Landi, Italian composer (b. 1587)
- November 3 – Martin de Porres, Peruvian monk, Roman Catholic saint (b. 1579)
- November 4 – Thomas Finch, 2nd Earl of Winchilsea, Member of Parliament (b. 1578)
- November 7 – Thomas Arundell, 1st Baron Arundell of Wardour, English politician (b. c. 1560)
- November 8 – Richard Knightley, English politician (b. 1593)
- November 26 – John Spottiswoode, Scottish archbishop and historian (b. 1565)
- December 15 – Muzio Oddi, Italian mathematician (b. 1569)
- December 17 – Nils Turesson Bielke, Swedish politician (b. 1569)
- December 25 – John Christian of Brieg, Duke of Brzeg (b. 1591)
- Date unknown – Madeleine du Fargis, French courtier
- Approximate date – John Ford, English dramatist (b. 1586)
