= 1630 =

1630 in various calendars
- Gregorian calendar: 1630; MDCXXX
- Ab urbe condita: 2383
- Armenian calendar: 1079; ԹՎ ՌՀԹ
- Assyrian calendar: 6380
- Balinese saka calendar: 1551–1552
- Bengali calendar: 1036–1037
- Berber calendar: 2580
- English Regnal year: 5 Cha. 1 – 6 Cha. 1
- Buddhist calendar: 2174
- Burmese calendar: 992
- Byzantine calendar: 7138–7139
- Chinese calendar: 己巳年 (Earth Snake); 4327 or 4120 — to — 庚午年 (Metal Horse); 4328 or 4121
- Coptic calendar: 1346–1347
- Discordian calendar: 2796
- Ethiopian calendar: 1622–1623
- Hebrew calendar: 5390–5391
- Hindu calendars
- Vikram Samvat: 1686–1687
- Shaka Samvat: 1551–1552
- Kali Yuga: 4730–4731
- Holocene calendar: 11630
- Igbo calendar: 630–631
- Iranian calendar: 1008–1009
- Islamic calendar: 1039–1040
- Japanese calendar: Kan'ei 7 (寛永７年)
- Javanese calendar: 1551–1552
- Julian calendar: Gregorian minus 10 days
- Korean calendar: 3963
- Minguo calendar: 282 before ROC 民前282年
- Nanakshahi calendar: 162
- Thai solar calendar: 2172–2173
- Tibetan calendar: ས་མོ་སྦྲུལ་ལོ་ (female Earth-Snake); 1756 or 1375 or 603 — to — ལྕགས་ཕོ་རྟ་ལོ་ (male Iron-Horse); 1757 or 1376 or 604

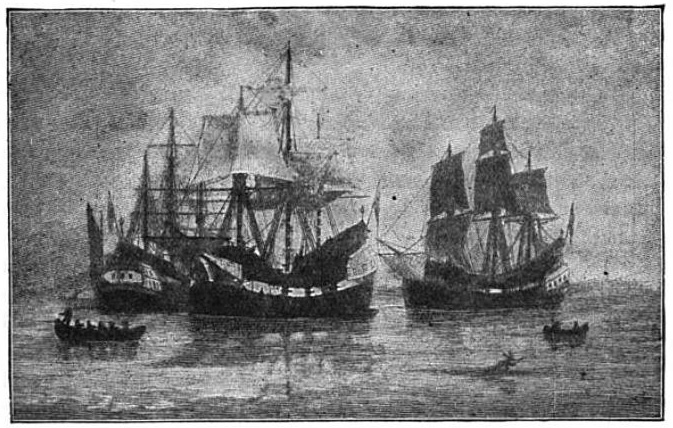
April 8: The Winthrop Fleet, with 400 people on three ships, sails towards New England.

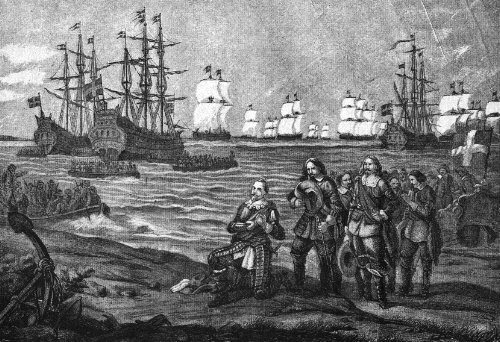
July 6: Gustav Adolf of Sweden makes landfall in Pomerania.

1630 (MDCXXX) was a common year starting on Tuesday of the Gregorian calendar and a common year starting on Friday of the Julian calendar, the 1630th year of the Common Era (CE) and Anno Domini (AD) designations, the 630th year of the 2nd millennium, the 30th year of the 17th century, and the 1st year of the 1630s decade. As of the start of 1630, the Gregorian calendar was 10 days ahead of the Julian calendar, which remained in localized use until 1923.

== Events ==
=== January–March ===
- January 2 – A shoemaker in Turin is found to have the first case of bubonic plague there as the plague of 1630 begins spreading through Italy.
- January 5 – A team of Portuguese military advisers to China's Ming dynasty government arrive at Zhuozhou. Led by Gonçalo Teixeira Corrêa, and accompanied by interpreter João Rodrigues, the group begins training the troops of Governor Sun Yuanhua in using modern cannons.
- January 11 – Otto III and his brother William Augustus, both, Dukes of Brunswick-Harburg, sell their rights to inherit rule of Brunswick-Lüneburg to Prince Christian in return for their debts of more than 150,000 thaler being paid.
- January 13 – In China, General Yuan Chonghuan is invited to an audience with the Chongzhen Emperor and is arrested on charges of collusion with the enemy. Yuan is executed by the slow death on September 22.
- January 18 – Nicolò Contarini is elected as the new Doge of the Republic of Venice and spends most of his time fighting a bubonic plague epidemic, but dies in office on April 2, 1631.
- February 22 – Native American Quadequine introduces popcorn to English colonists.
- March 3 – A fleet sent by the Dutch West India Company captures Recife from the Portuguese, establishing Dutch Brazil.
- March 9 – The 1630 Crete earthquake occurs.
- March – Fedorovych Uprising: Zaporozhian Cossacks rebel against the Polish–Lithuanian Commonwealth, and occupy a large part of modern-day Ukraine. After a number of indecisive skirmishes with a Polish army sent to pacify the region, the Treaty of Pereyaslav is signed, ending the uprising.

=== April–June ===
- April 8 – Puritan migration to New England (1620-1640): Winthrop Fleet – The ship Arbella and three others set sail from the Solent in England, with 400 passengers under the leadership of John Winthrop, headed for the Massachusetts Bay Colony in America; seven more, with another 300 aboard, follow in the next few weeks.
- May 4 – In an invasion of Persia, Ottoman Empire Grand Vizier Gazi Hüsrev Pasha routs the Persians in a battle at Mahidasht near Kermanshah.
- May 17
  - The first case of plague is reported in Milan. By the end of 1631, the city of 250,000 suffers 186,000 deaths, losing almost three-quarters of its population to plague.
  - Italian astronomers Niccolò Zucchi and Daniello Bartoli become the first scientists to observe the belts on the planet Jupiter.
- May 20 – The Swedish National Heritage Board (Riksantikvarieämbetet) is created, with Johannes Bureus as its first director. The Board is still in existence almost 400 years later.
- May 25 – Fedorovych uprising: The Zaporozhian Cossacks, led by Taras Triasylo, defeat Polish and Lithuanian troops led by General Stanisław Koniecpolski near Pereiaslav. The battle is later the subject of the Ukrainian language poem Tarasova nich.
- May 29 – The Battle of Villabuona is fought in Italy at Lombardy, with more than 4,000 French and Venetian troops killed in an attack by Matthias Gallas of the Holy Roman Empire's army.
- June 4 – Scottish-born Presbyterian (and former physician) Alexander Leighton is brought before Archbishop William Laud's Star Chamber court in London for publishing the seditious pamphlet An Appeale to the Parliament, or, Sions Plea Against the Prelacy, an attack on Anglican bishops (printed in the Netherlands, 1628). He is sentenced to be pilloried and whipped, have his ears cropped, one side of his nose slit, and his face branded with "SS" (for "sower of sedition"), to be imprisoned, and be degraded from holy orders.
- June 6 – Swedish warships depart from Stockholm, Sweden for Central Europe.
- June 12 – Massachusetts Bay Colony is founded, with John Winthrop as governor.
- June 14 – Passengers of the Arbella, including Anne Bradstreet, America's first poet of significance, finally set foot in the New World at Salem, Massachusetts.

=== July–September ===
- July 6
  - The Success, last ship of the Winthrop Fleet, lands safely at Salem harbor, Massachusetts Bay Colony.
  - Swedish intervention in the Thirty Years' War begins when King Gustavus Adolphus of Sweden, leading an army of 13,000 on the Protestant side, makes landfall at Peenemünde, Pomerania.
- July 9 – Thirty Years' War: Stettin is taken by Swedish forces.
- July 18 – War of the Mantuan Succession: Mantua is sacked by an army of the Holy Roman Empire, led by Count Johann von Aldringen.
- July 24 – The Sibbald baronets British nobility title is created.
- July 30 – John Winthrop helps in founding a church in Massachusetts, which will later become known as First Church in Boston.
- July – The Italian plague of 1629–31 reaches Venice.
- August 13 – Thirty Years' War: As a result of heavy pressure from the Prince-electors, Ferdinand II, Holy Roman Emperor, dismisses general Albrecht von Wallenstein from command of the Imperial Army.
- August 25 – Sinhalese–Portuguese War: In the Battle of Randeniwela on the island of Sri Lanka, King Senarat of Kandy leads more than 35,000 troops in killing most of an attack force led by Portuguese Ceylon governor Constantino de Sá de Noronha.
- September 4 – Thirty Years' War: the Treaty of Stettin is signed by Sweden and the Duchy of Pomerania, forming a close alliance between them, as well as giving Sweden full military control over Pomerania.
- September 7 – Governor John Winthrop passes a resolution declaring "that Trimontaine" on Shawmut peninsula shall be called Boston from now on.
- September 17 (September 7 Old Style) – The settlement of Boston, Massachusetts Bay Colony is founded.
- September 24 – The first ship of de Sauce's emigrants arrive at Southampton Hundred, on the James River in Virginia.

=== October–December ===
- October 13 – War of the Mantuan Succession: the Peace of Regensburg is signed. Charles Gonzaga is confirmed as Duke of Mantua.
- October 17 – Empress Meishō's Coronation takes place.
- October 18 – Frendraught Castle in Scotland, the home of James Crichton of Frendraught, burns down.
- November 10 – Day of the Dupes: Marie de' Medici attempts to oust Cardinal Richelieu from the French Court, but fails after two days.
- November 13 – The Battle of Falkenberg takes place.
- December 3 – (28 Rabi II 1040 AH) Abd Allah ibn Hasan is selected as the new Emir of Mecca after the death from tuberculosis of Mas'ud ibn Idris.

=== Date unknown ===
- Paramaribo (in modern-day Suriname) is first settled by the English.
- The Deccan Famine of 1630–32 in India begins; it will kill some two million.
- In the Mughal Empire, Shah Jahan's Pearl Mosque at Lahore Fort is consecrated (completed 1635).
- The central square of Covent Garden in London is laid out, and a market begins to develop there.
- Johann Heinrich Alsted's Encyclopaedia septem tomis distincta is published.
- Settlers leave Pannaway Plantation and begin to settle in Strawbery Banke which in 1653 is renamed Portsmouth, New Hampshire.

== Births ==
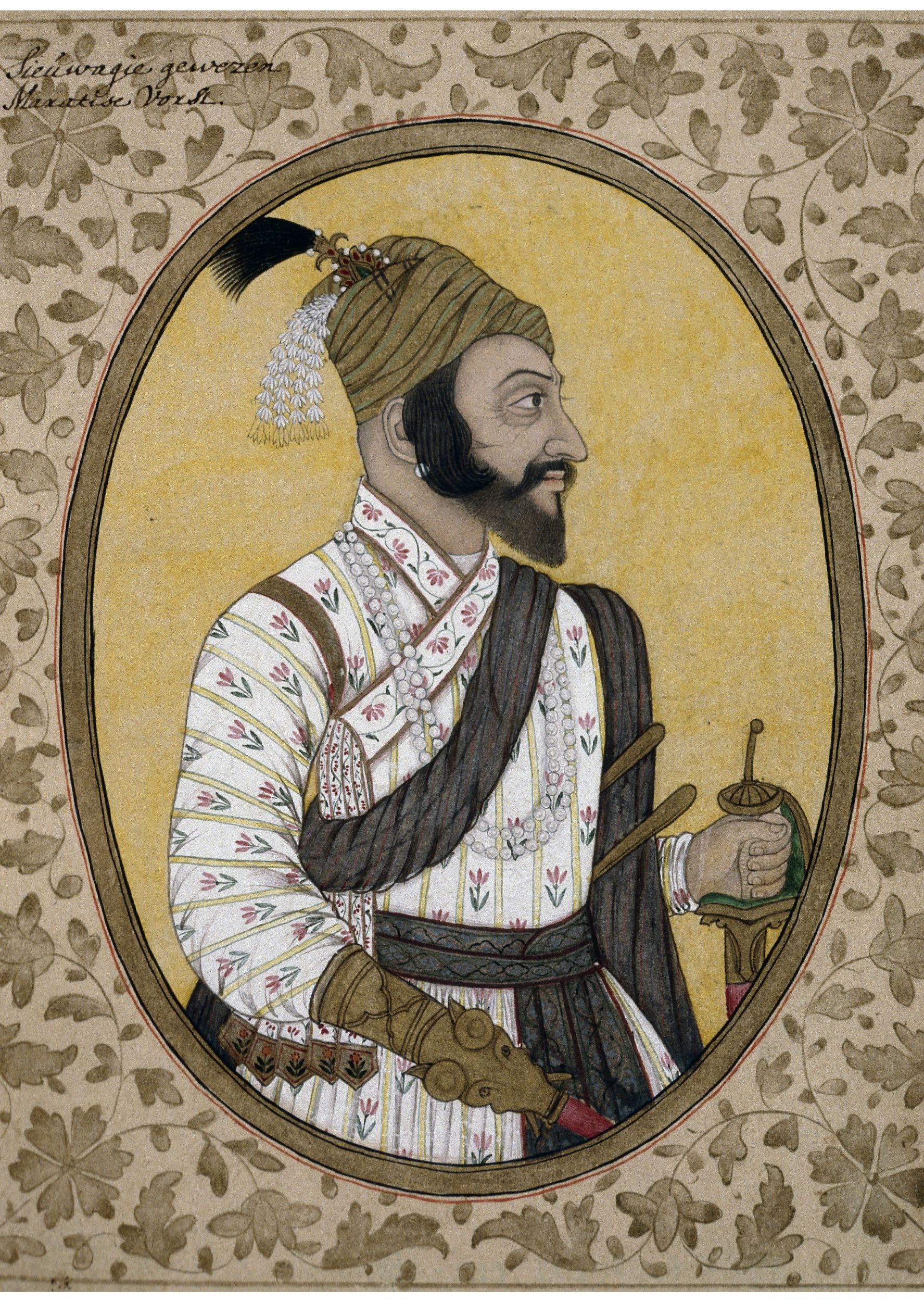
Shivaji I

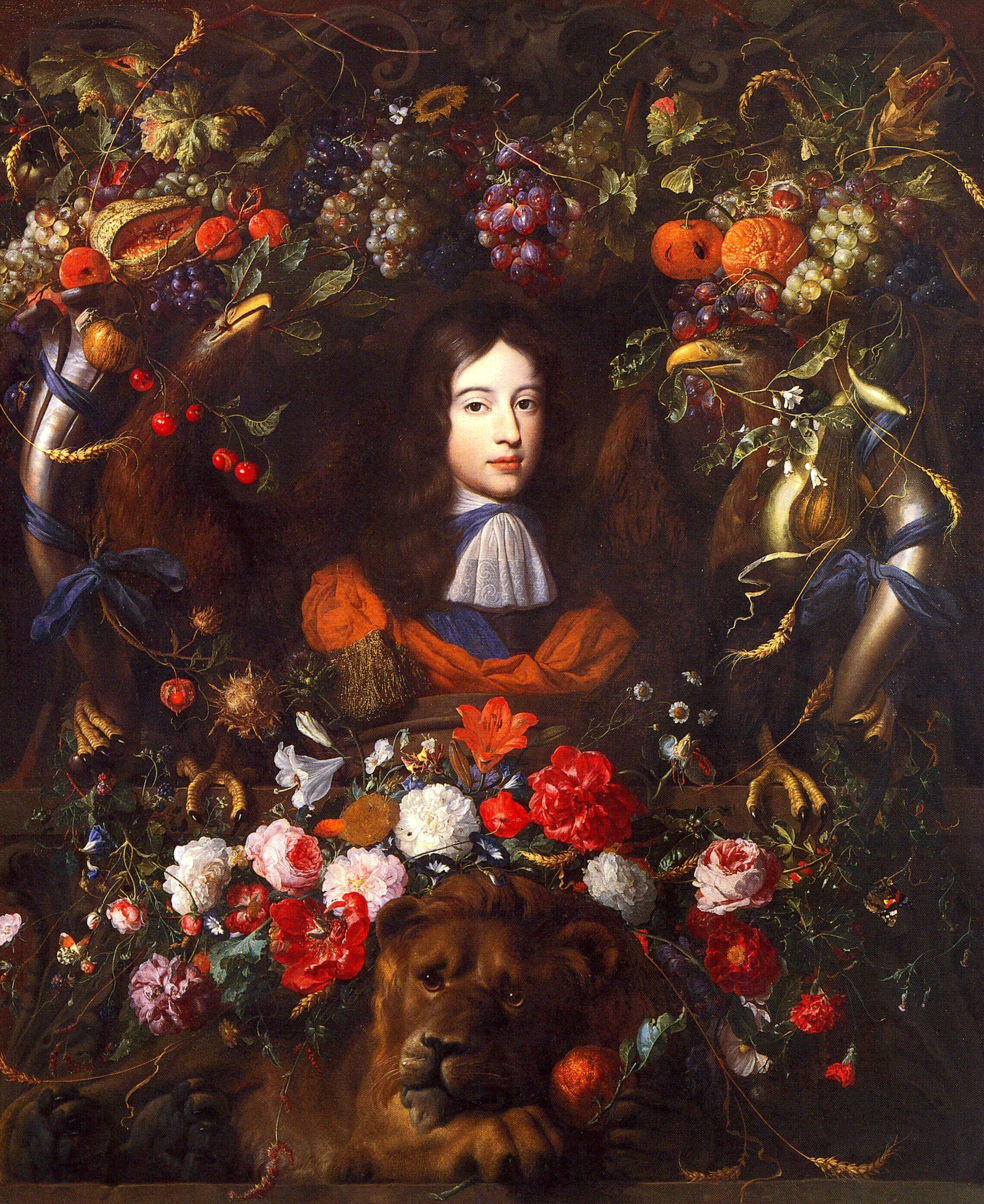
Jan Vermeer van Utrecht

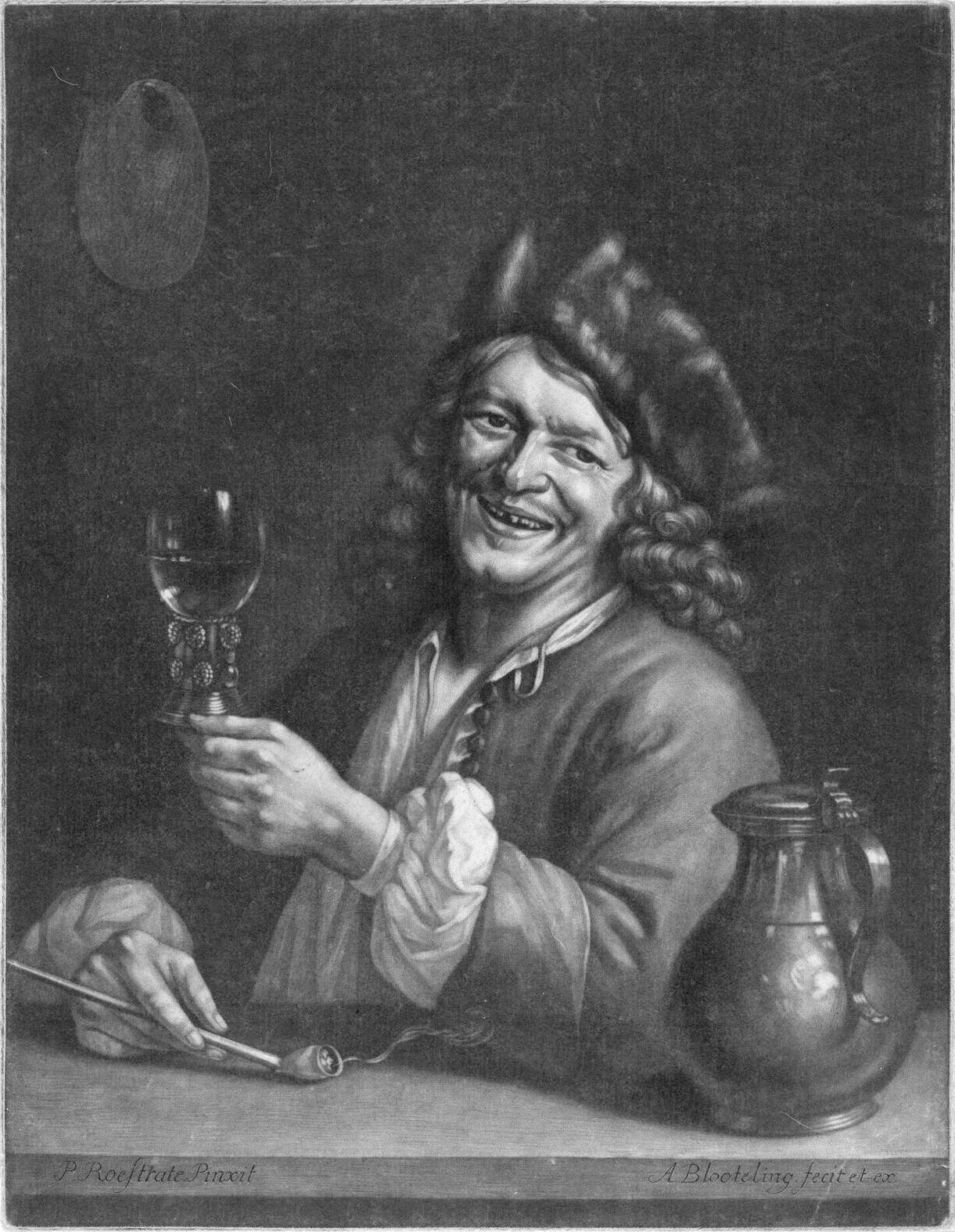
Pieter Gerritsz van Roestraten

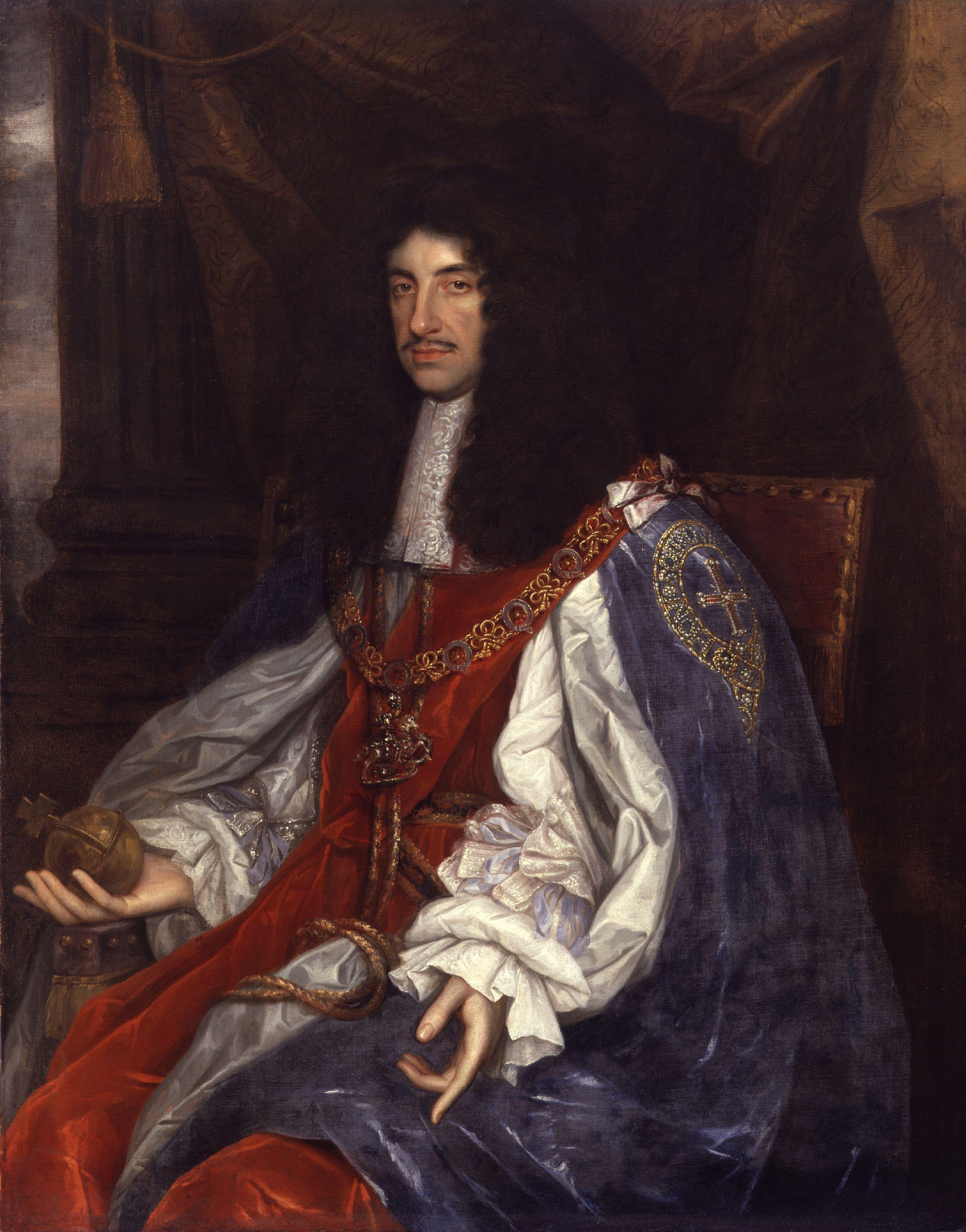
Charles II of England

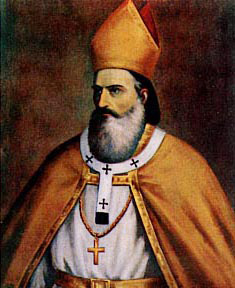
Estephan El Douaihy

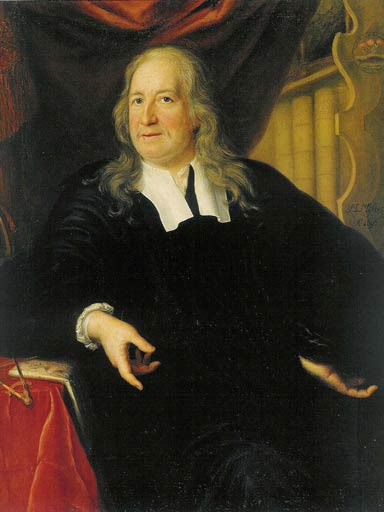
Olaus Rudbeck

=== January–March ===
- January 3 – Herbert Westfaling, English politician (d. 1705)
- January 5 – Manuel da Câmara III, Portuguese noble (d. 1673)
- January 10 – Edward Blaker, English politician (d. 1678)
- January 11
  - Charles Berkeley, 1st Earl of Falmouth, English noble, son of Charles Berkeley (d. 1665)
  - John Rogers, English-born President of Harvard (d. 1684)
- January 13 – Ōta Suketsugu, Japanese daimyō (d. 1685)
- January 16 – Guru Har Rai, Sikh guru (d. 1661)
- January 18 – Andrew Balfour, Scottish doctor (d. 1694)
- January 20 – Philip Florinus of Sulzbach, Austrian field marshal (d. 1703)
- January 25 – Louis VI, Landgrave of Hesse-Darmstadt (1661–1678) (d. 1678)
- January 27 – Job Adriaenszoon Berckheyde, Dutch painter (d. 1693)
- February 8 – Pierre Daniel Huet, French churchman and scholar (d. 1721)
- February 12 – Cornelis Bisschop, Dutch painter (d. 1674)
- February 16 – Jan Vermeer van Utrecht, Dutch painter (d. 1696)
- February 19 – Shivaji, Indian warrior king, founder of the Maratha Kingdom (d. 1680)
- February 20 (bapt.) – Josefa de Óbidos, Spanish artist (d. 1684)
- March 23 – Ignace Cotolendi, French bishop (d. 1662)
- March 24 – José Saenz d'Aguirre, Spanish Catholic cardinal (d. 1699)
- March 25 – Thierry Beschefer, French Jesuit missionary (d. 1711)
- March 28 – Silvestro Valiero, Doge of Venice (d. 1700)

=== April–June ===
- April 1 – Jacob Boreel, Dutch diplomat and politician (d. 1697)
- April 7 – Ulrik Christian Gyldenløve, commander-in-chief of the Danish army (d. 1658)
- April 16 – Lambert van Haven, Danish architect (d. 1695)
- April 21 – Pieter Gerritsz van Roestraten, Dutch painter (d. 1700)
- April 28 – Charles Cotton, English poet and writer (d. 1687)
- May 3
  - Thomas Rosewell, English minister (d. 1692)
  - Jacob von Sandrart, German engraver (d. 1708)
- May 4 – Hendrik Schoock, Dutch painter (d. 1707)
- May 6 – Johan Hadorph, Swedish director-general of the Central Board of National Antiquities (d. 1693)
- May 12 – Jean-Baptiste de Santeul, French writer (d. 1697)
- May 17 – John Howe, English Puritan theologian (d. 1705)
- May 29 – King Charles II of England, Scotland, and Ireland (d. 1685)
- June 1 – Carlo Barberini, Italian Catholic cardinal (d. 1704)
- June 4 – Jacques Rousseau, French painter (d. 1693)
- June 7 – John Talbot of Lacock, English politician and general (d. 1714)
- June 8 – Wolf Caspar von Klengel, German architect in Saxony (d. 1691)
- June 10 – Willem van Bemmel, Dutch Golden Age painter (d. 1708)
- June 24 – Henry Cavendish, 2nd Duke of Newcastle, English politician (d. 1691)

=== July–September ===
- July 22 – Madame de Brinvilliers, French murderer (d. 1676)
- August 1 – Thomas Clifford, 1st Baron Clifford of Chudleigh, English statesman (d. 1673)
- August 2 – Estephan El Douaihy, Lebanese Maronite Patriarch, historian (d. 1704)
- August 20 or August 27 – Maria van Oosterwijck, Dutch Golden Age painter (d. 1693)
- August 22 – Guy Aldonce de Durfort de Lorges, French noble, soldier (d. 1702)
- August 27 – Thomas Risley, English Presbyterian minister (d. 1716)
- September 6 – Thomas Hele, English politician (d. 1665)
- September 17 – Ranuccio II Farnese, Duke of Parma from 1646 until his death (d. 1694)
- September 25 – Pierre Cally, French philosopher and theologian (d. 1709)
- September 27 – Michael Willmann, German painter (d. 1706)

=== October–December ===
- October 2 – Henry Caesar, English politician (d. 1668)
- October 8 – Henry Bull, English politician (d. 1692)
- October 10 – Thomas Lawson, British botanist (d. 1691)
- October 14 – Sophia of Hanover, heir to the throne of Great Britain (d. 1714)
- October 18 – Henry Powle, English politician (d. 1692)
- October – John Tillotson, Archbishop of Canterbury (d. 1694)
- November 8 – Robert Bertie, 3rd Earl of Lindsey, English noble (d. 1701)
- November 12 – Catherine Duchemin, French flower and fruit painter (d. 1698)
- November 16 – Edvard Edvardsen, Norwegian historian and educator (d. 1695)
- November 17 – Hachisuka Mitsutaka, Japanese daimyō who ruled the Tokushima Domain (d. 1666)
- November 18 – Eleonora Gonzaga, Queen consort of Ferdinand III, Holy Roman Emperor (d. 1686)
- November 24 – Étienne Baluze, French scholar (d. 1718))
- November 27 – Sigismund Francis, Archduke of Austria, ruler of Further Austria including Tyrol (1662–1665) (d. 1665)
- December 5 – Sophie Augusta of Holstein-Gottorp, Regent of Anhalt-Zerbst (d. 1680)
- December 12 – Olaus Rudbeck, Swedish architect (d. 1702)
- December 14 – Horatio Townshend, 1st Viscount Townshend, English viscount (d. 1687)
- December 16 – Mary Somerset, Duchess of Beaufort, British botanist (d. 1715)
- December 28 – Ludolf Bakhuizen, Dutch painter (d. 1708)

=== Probable ===
- Stefano Erardi, Maltese painter (d. 1716)
- John Leslie, 1st Duke of Rothes, Scottish noble (d. 1681)
- Lucy Walter, Welsh mistress to King Charles II of England

== Deaths ==
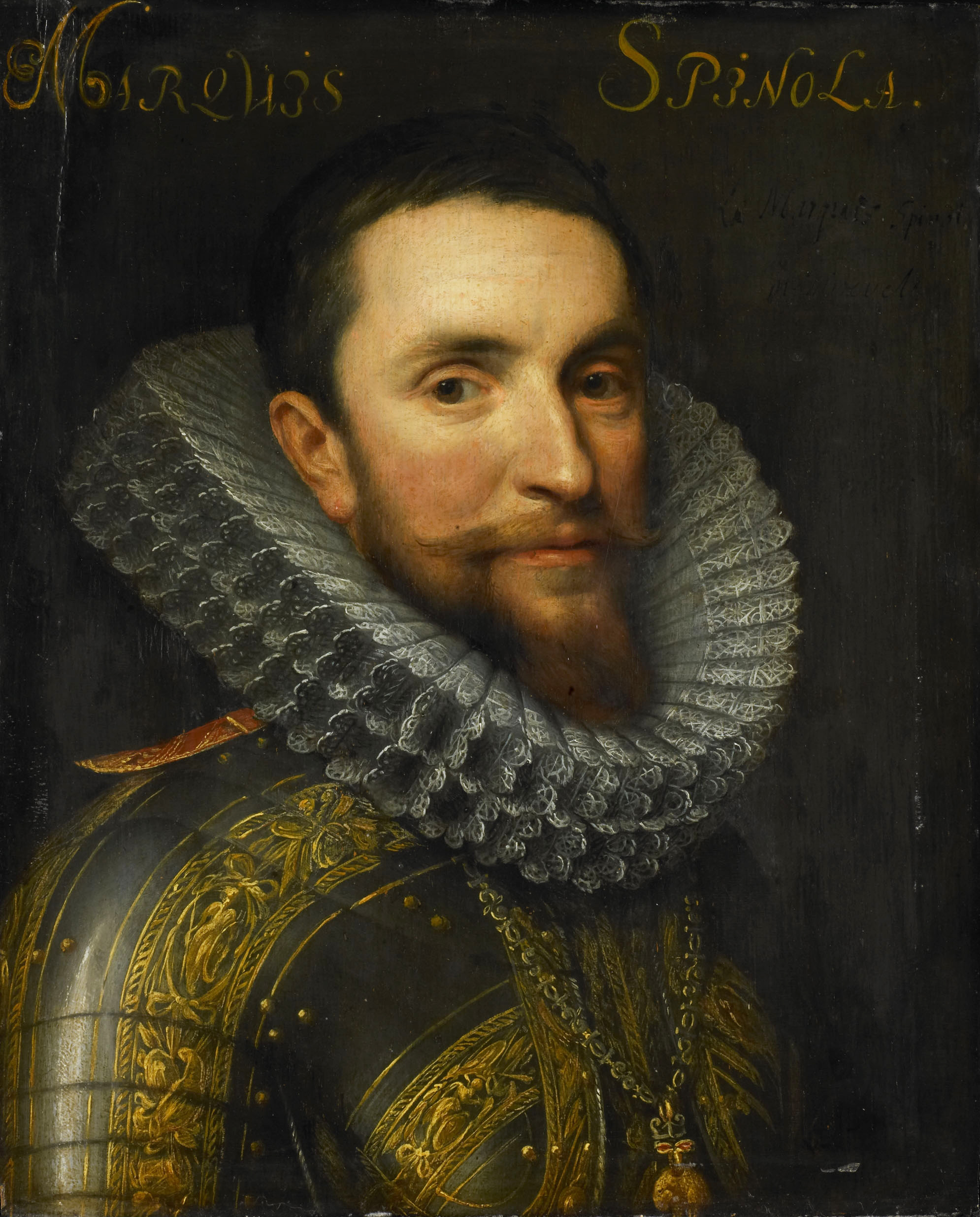
Ambrogio Spinola

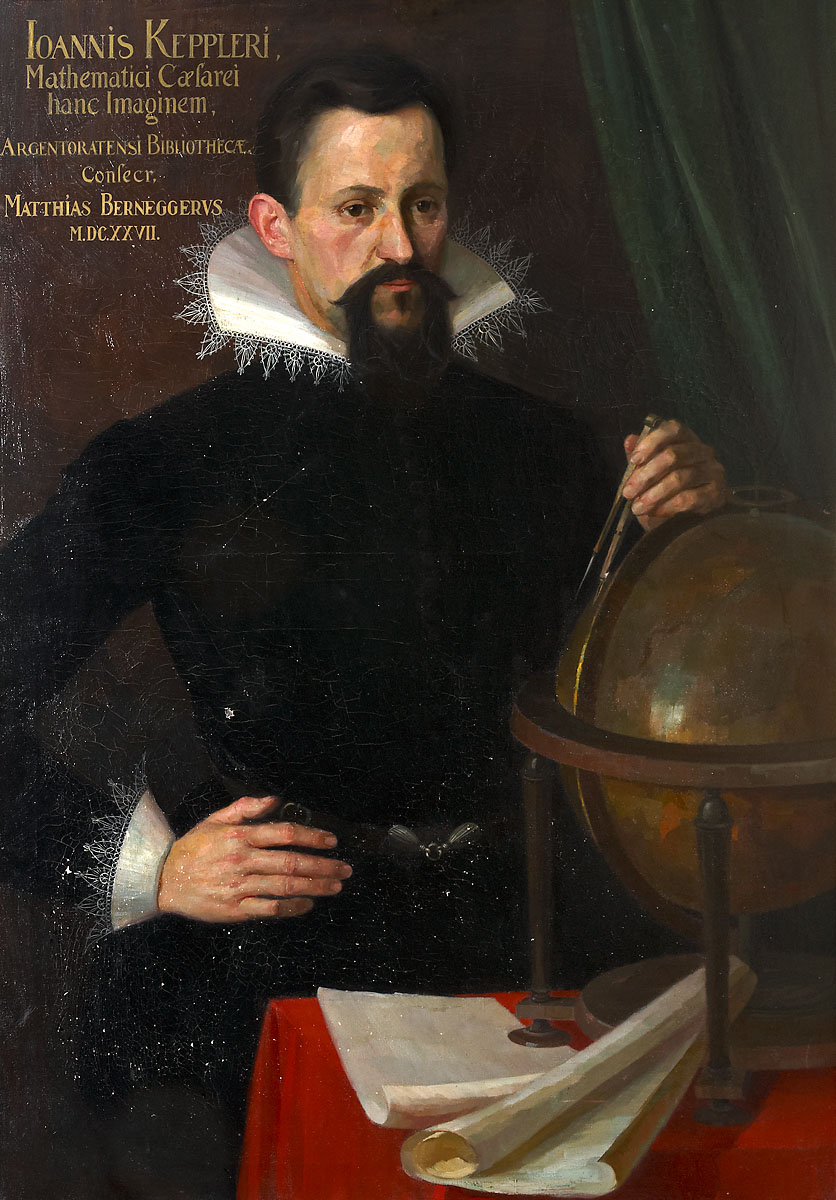
Johannes Kepler

- January 26 – Henry Briggs, English mathematician (b. 1556)
- February 12 – Fynes Moryson, English traveler and writer (b. 1566)
- February 26 – William Brade, English composer (b. 1560)
- April 2 – George Talbot, 9th Earl of Shrewsbury, English earl (b. 1566)
- April 10 – William Herbert, 3rd Earl of Pembroke, English noble, courtier and patron of the arts (b. 1580)
- April 17 – Christian I, Prince of Anhalt-Bernburg, German prince of the House of Ascania (b. 1568)
- April 19 – Anne Howard, Countess of Arundel, English countess and poet (b. 1557)
- April 22 – Agostino Ciampelli, Italian painter (b. 1565)
- April 29 – Agrippa d'Aubigné, French poet and soldier (b. 1552)
- May 17 – Dorothea Flock, German alleged witch (b. 1608)
- May 30 – Emanuel Scrope, 1st Earl of Sunderland, English noble (b. 1584)
- June 25 – Jacob Ulfeldt, Danish politician (b. 1567)
- July 26 – Charles Emmanuel I, Duke of Savoy (b. 1562)
- August 11 – Thomas Walsingham, English spymaster (b. 1561)
- August 22 – Giulio Mancini, Italian papal physician (b. 1559)
- September 5 – Nicolaus Mulerius, Dutch astronomer and medical academic (b. 1564)
- September 17 – Thomas Lake, English statesman (b. 1567)
- September 18 – Melchior Klesl, Austrian cardinal and statesman (b. 1552)
- September 20 – Claudio Saracini, Italian composer (b. 1586)
- September 22 – Yuan Chonghuan, Chinese politician, military general and writer (b. 1584)
- September 24 – Charles Günther, Count of Schwarzburg-Rudolstadt (b. 1576)
- September 25 – Ambrogio Spinola, 1st Marquis of the Balbases, Italian general (b. 1569)
- October 10 – John Heminges, English actor (b. 1566)
- October 22 – Jerónima de la Asunción, Spanish founder of the Monastery of Santa Clara (b. 1555)
- November 15 – Johannes Kepler, German astronomer (b. 1571)
- November 9 – Tōdō Takatora, Japanese daimyo (b. 1556)
- November 18 – Esaias van de Velde, Dutch painter (b. 1587)
- November 19
  - Antonio Brunelli, Italian composer and theorist (b. 1577)
  - Johann Hermann Schein, German composer (b. 1586)
- November 29 – Teodósio II, Duke of Braganza (b. 1568)
- December 11 – Franciscus Dousa, Dutch classical scholar (b. 1577)
- December 19 – Orazio Riminaldi, Italian painter (b. 1593)
- approx. date
  - Adam Haslmayr, Austrian commentator on the Rosicrucian Manifestos (b. c. 1560)
  - Fede Galizia, Italian painter (b. c. 1578)
- unknown date – Mariangiola Criscuolo, Italian painter (b. c. 1548)
