= Sibbald baronets =

- Sibbald baronets of Rankelour (1630)
- Sibbald baronets of Dunninald (1806)
