= Hôtel de Ville, Châlons-en-Champagne =

Town hall in Châlons-en-Champagne, France

Hôtel de Ville
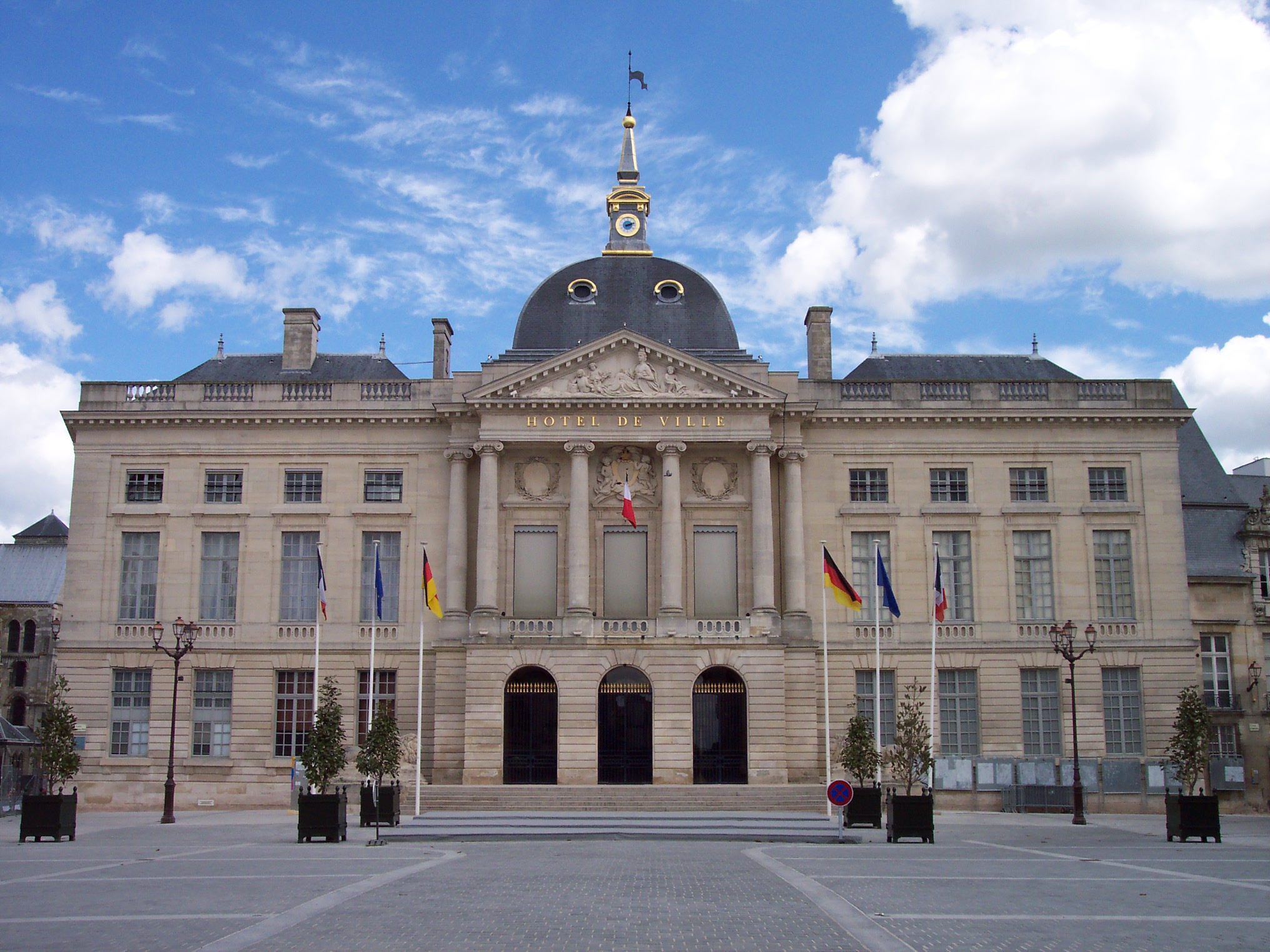
- The main frontage of the Hôtel de Ville in May 2004

General information
- Type: City hall
- Architectural style: Neoclassical style
- Location: Châlons-en-Champagne, France
- Coordinates: 48.9567°N 4.3628°E
- Completed: 1776

Design and construction
- Architect: Jean-Nicolas-Louis Durand

Monument historique
- Official name: Hôtel de ville
- Type: Inscrit
- Designated: 1932
- Reference no.: PA00078623

The Hôtel de Ville (French pronunciation: [otɛl də vil], City Hall) is a municipal building in Châlons-en-Champagne, Marne, northeast France, standing on Place du Maréchal Foch. It was designated a monument historique by the French government in 1932.

== History ==
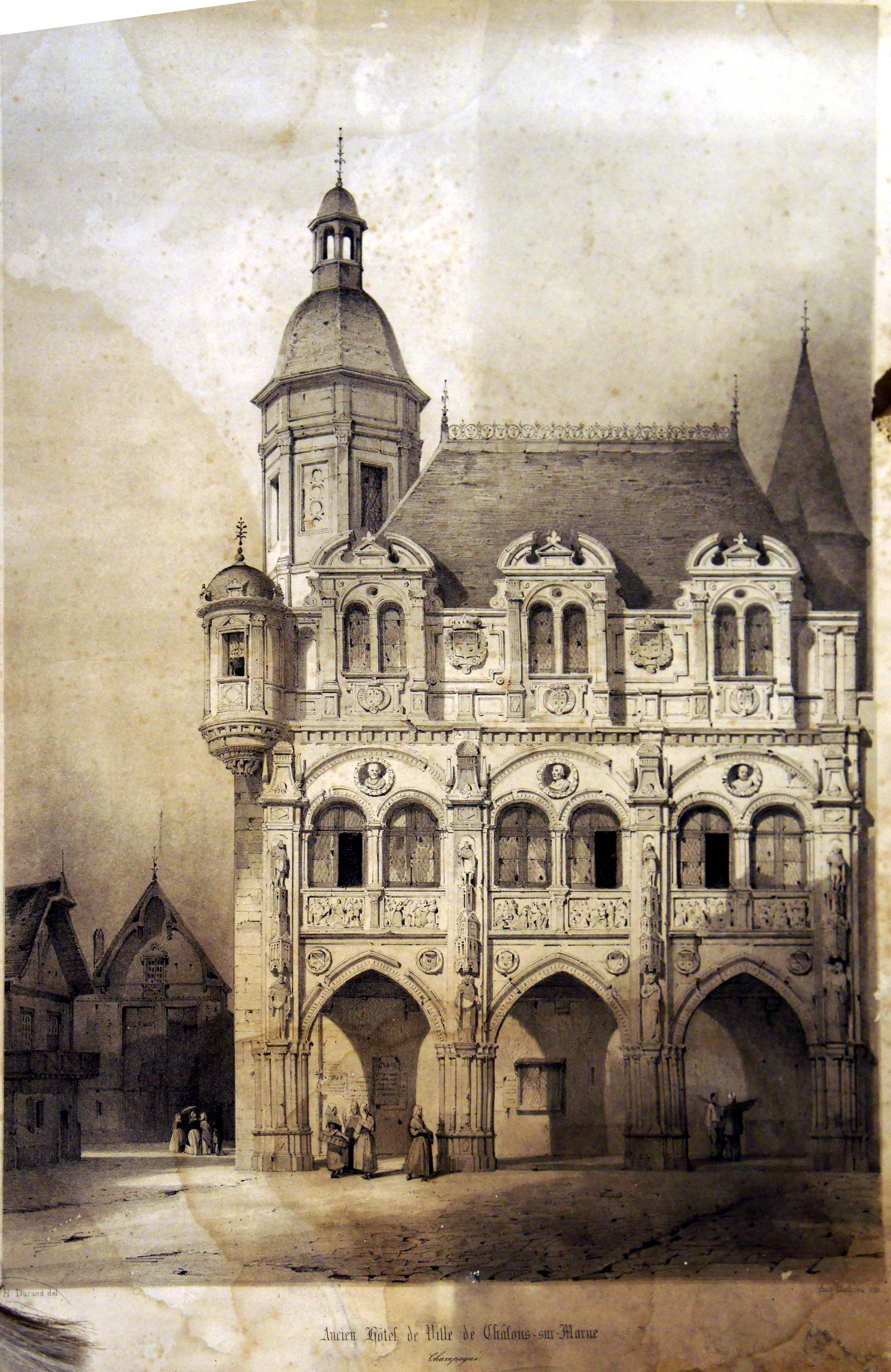
The old town hall of 1612

At least as far back as the 15th century, and possibly before, the aldermen met at the Saint-Esprit Hospital. In the 16th century, they decided to commission a meeting place which would be known as the Maison Commune. The site selected was in the central part of the town (now Place du Maréchal Foch). Construction started in 1553 but was delayed because of the French Wars of Religion. The new building was designed in the Renaissance style, built in ashlar stone and was completed in 1612. The building featured a series of arches on the ground floor, a series of bi-partite round-headed windows, with colonettes separating the parts, on the first floor, and a series of bi-partite mullioned windows, with curved pediments, at attic level. It also featured bartizans at the corners and an octagonal belfry on the roof.

In the 1770s, Gaspard-Louis Rouillé d'Orfeuil, who was the local intendant and, as such, the king's representative in the town, decided to demolish the old town centre, including the Maison Commune, and to create a new civic square with a new town hall and theatre, as well as new boulevards. Construction of the town hall started in 1772. It was designed by Jean-Nicolas-Louis Durand in the neoclassical style, built in ashlar stone and was completed in 1776.

The design involved a symmetrical main frontage of 11 bays facing onto the square. The ground floor was rusticated. The centre section of three bays, which was slightly projected forward, featured three round headed openings on the ground floor, and a large portico spanning the first and second floors, formed by six Ionic order columns supporting a modillioned pediment, above. There was a carving depicting a woman attended by two putti in the tympanum. Within the portico, there were three French doors with balconies on the first floor, and three panels on the second floor: the centre panel contained a carving of two angels supporting a shield bearing three fleurs-de-lis. The wings were fenestrated by tall casement windows on the ground and first floors, and by square casement windows on the second floor. At roof level, there was a balustraded parapet and, behind the central pediment, there was a large dome, surmounted by a small clock tower with a spire. Internally, the principal rooms were the Salon d'honneur (ballroom), the Salle des Mariages (wedding room) and the Salle du Conseil (council chamber).

Four statues of lions created by the sculptor, Antoine Lépine, were installed outside the building in 1778. During the French Revolution, revolutionaries caused damage to the fleurs-de-lis, when they tried to hack them off with a hammer.

A series of wooden tablets created by Nicolas Perseval depicting local historical personalities were hung in a corridor on the first floor. The wedding room was decorated with a series of paintings by Jean-Baptiste Lallemand, while the council chamber later featured a painting by Édouard Detaille depicting President Félix Faure and Tsar Nicholas II of Russia inspecting the troops at Camp de Châlons in 1896.

On 12 June 1940, during the Second World War, Lieutenant Paul Loyer of the 485th Regiment of Colonial Pioneers was killed by flying shrapnel while defending the town hall against a German assault on the building. Following the liberation of the town by American troops on 29 August 1944, the local people flocked to the town hall where they were greeted by French officials standing on the balcony.

Between 2009 and 2014, a full-height cuboid-shaped extension, enclosing a lift, was built inside the courtyard behind the building at a cost of €2.6 million, allowing improved access for disabled people to the upper floors as well as improved egress in the case of a fire.
