= Jean-Baptiste Charbonnier =

French organist and composer

Jean Baptiste Charbonnier (23 April 1764 – 22 October 1859) was a French organist and composer.

== Life ==
Born in Châlons-sur-Marne, Charbonnier was successively organist in Châlons, at the Churches of Saint-Nicaise, Notre-Dame en Vaux, Saint-Alpin, and finally of the Saint-Étienne cathedral.

He died in his native city of Châlons on 22 October 1859 at the age of 95.

== Works ==
He leaves an abundant body of work for the organ: varied Christmas, imitative works, storms, battles, harmonizations.

== Bibliography ==
- Louis Grignon, Notice sur les œuvres musicales de M. J.-B. Charbonnier ancien organiste à Châlons-sur-Marne, Châlons-sur-Marne, 1878.
- Sylvain Mikus, Vie et œuvre de Jean-Baptiste Charbonnier (1764-1859), Champagne généalogie, 1990.
- Sylvain Mikus, Les organistes de la cathédrale de Châlons-en-Champagne au fil du temps, Le Petit Catalaunien illustré, spring 2009.

== See also ==
- French organ school
- Noël varié
