= Henri Dagonet =

French psychiatrist

Henri Dagonet (3 February 1823 in Châlons-sur-Marne – 4 September 1902 in Paris) was a French psychiatrist.

In 1849, he received his medical doctorate and, during the following year, became superintendent at the Stéphansfeld asylum. From 1854, he was a professeur agrégé at Strasbourg, relocating to Paris in 1867, where he was appointed superintendent of the Sainte-Anne asylum. During his long career at Sainte-Anne, he worked with Prosper Lucas (1805–1885), Valentin Magnan (1835–1916) and Gustave Bouchereau (1835–1900). In 1885, he was president of the Société Médico-Psychologique.

In 1862, he published Traité élémentaire et pratique des maladies mentales, with further editions in 1876 and 1894 as Nouveau traité élémentaire et pratique des maladies mentales. The second edition (1876) is recognized as the first medical textbook to use photographic illustration of patients. The book contains eight Woodburytype plates depicting 33 "types of insanity".
