= The Studio of Ingres in Rome =

Painting by Jean Alaux

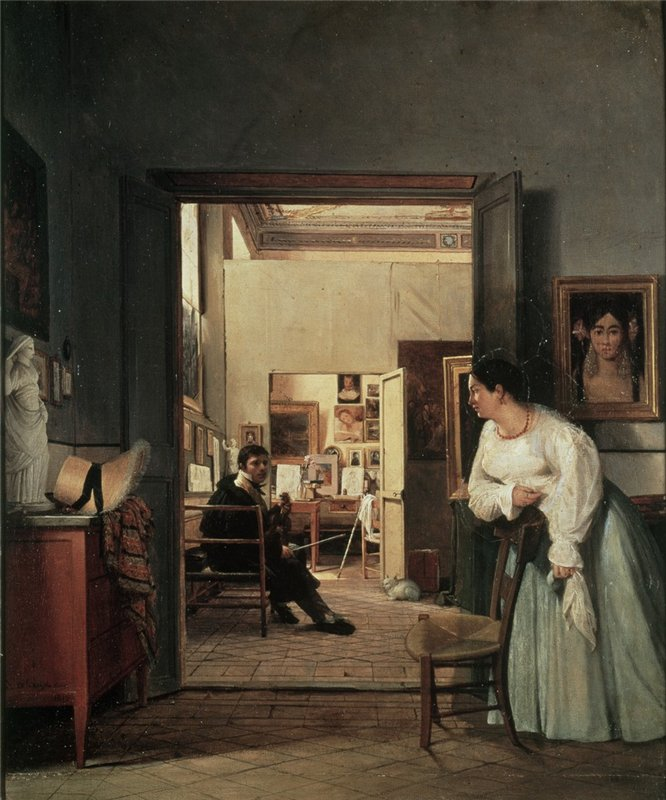
- Artist: Jean Alaux
- Year: 1818
- Type: Oil on canvas
- Dimensions: 55.4 cm × 46 cm (21.8 in × 18 in)
- Location: Musée Ingres Bourdelle; Montauban

The Studio of Ingres in Rome (French: L'Atelier d'Ingres in Rome) is an 1818 oil painting by the French artist Jean Alaux. It depicts the painter Jean Auguste Dominique Ingres in his studio on the Via Gregoriana in Rome. He is shown holding a violin in the company of his wife Madeleine Chapelle. In the background a number of his paintings can be seen on the walls.

The work has been in the collection of the Musée Ingres Bourdelle in Montauban, southern France, since 1886.

== Bibliography ==
- Crow, Thomas. Restoration: The Fall of Napoleon in the Course of European Art, 1812-1820. Princeton University Press, 2023
- Fahy, Everett (ed.) The Wrightsman Pictures. Metropolitan Museum of Art, 2005.
