= Châlons-en-Champagne =

Prefecture and commune in Grand Est, France

- Prefecture and commune
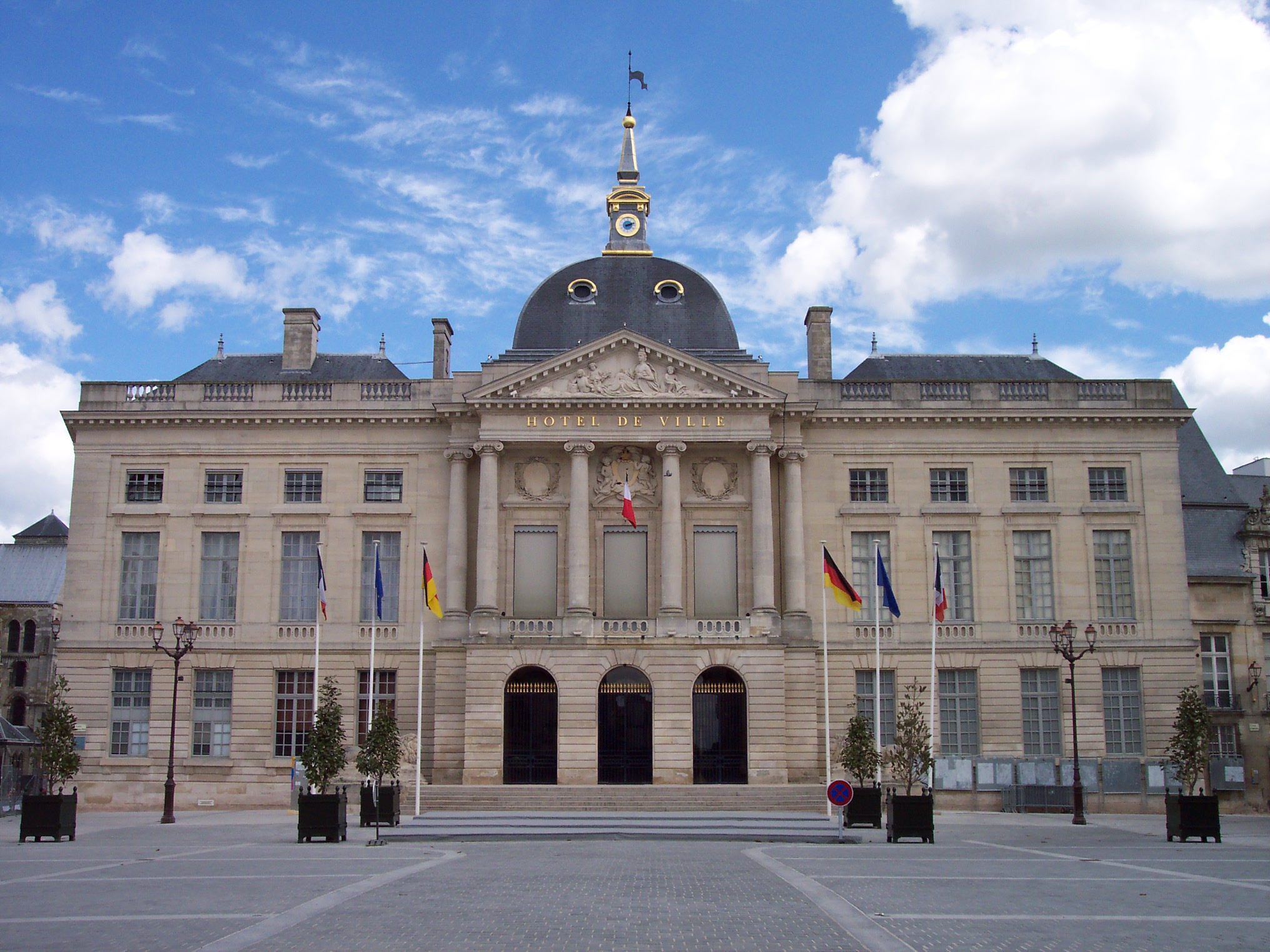
- The Hôtel de Ville

- Coat of arms
- Location of Châlons-en-Champagne
- Location within France Location within Grand Est
- Coordinates: 48°57′27″N 4°21′54″E
- Country: France
- Region: Grand Est
- Department: Marne
- Arrondissement: Châlons-en-Champagne
- Canton: Châlons-en-Champagne-1, 2 and 3
- Intercommunality: CA de Châlons-en-Champagne

Government
  - Mayor (2020–2026): Benoist Apparu (DVD)
- Area^{1}: 26.05 km^{2} (10.06 sq mi)
- Elevation: 83 m (272 ft)
- Highest elevation: 84 m (276 ft)
- Lowest elevation: 82 m (269 ft)
- Population (2023): 42,971
  - Density: 1,650/km^{2} (4,272/sq mi)
- Demonym: Châlonnais
- Time zone: UTC+01:00 (CET)
  - Summer (DST): UTC+02:00 (CEST)
- INSEE/Postal code: 51108 /51000
- Website: www.chalonsenchampagne.fr/ville
- ^{1} French Land Register data, which excludes lakes, ponds, glaciers > 1 km^{2} (0.386 sq mi or 247 acres) and river estuaries.

Châlons-en-Champagne (French pronunciation: [ʃɑlɔ̃ ɑ̃ ʃɑ̃paɲ]; lit. 'Châlons-in-Champagne') is a city in the Grand Est region of France. It is the prefecture of the Marne department, despite having only about a quarter of the population of the less central city of Reims. It is also the seat of the Communauté d'agglomération de Châlons-en-Champagne.

Formerly called Châlons-sur-Marne (lit. 'Châlons-on-Marne'), the city was officially renamed in 1995. It should not be confused with the Burgundian city of Chalon-sur-Saône.

== History ==
The city was a Gallic and later a Gallo-Roman settlement known in Latin as Catalaunum, taking its name from the Catalauni, a Belgic tribe dwelling in the region of modern Champagne.

Châlons is conjectured to be the site of several battles, including the Battle of Châlons, fought in 274 between Roman Emperor Aurelian and Emperor Tetricus I of the Gallic Empire, and the 451 Battle of the Catalaunian Plains, which turned back the westward advance of Attila.

The Hôtel de Ville was completed in 1776.

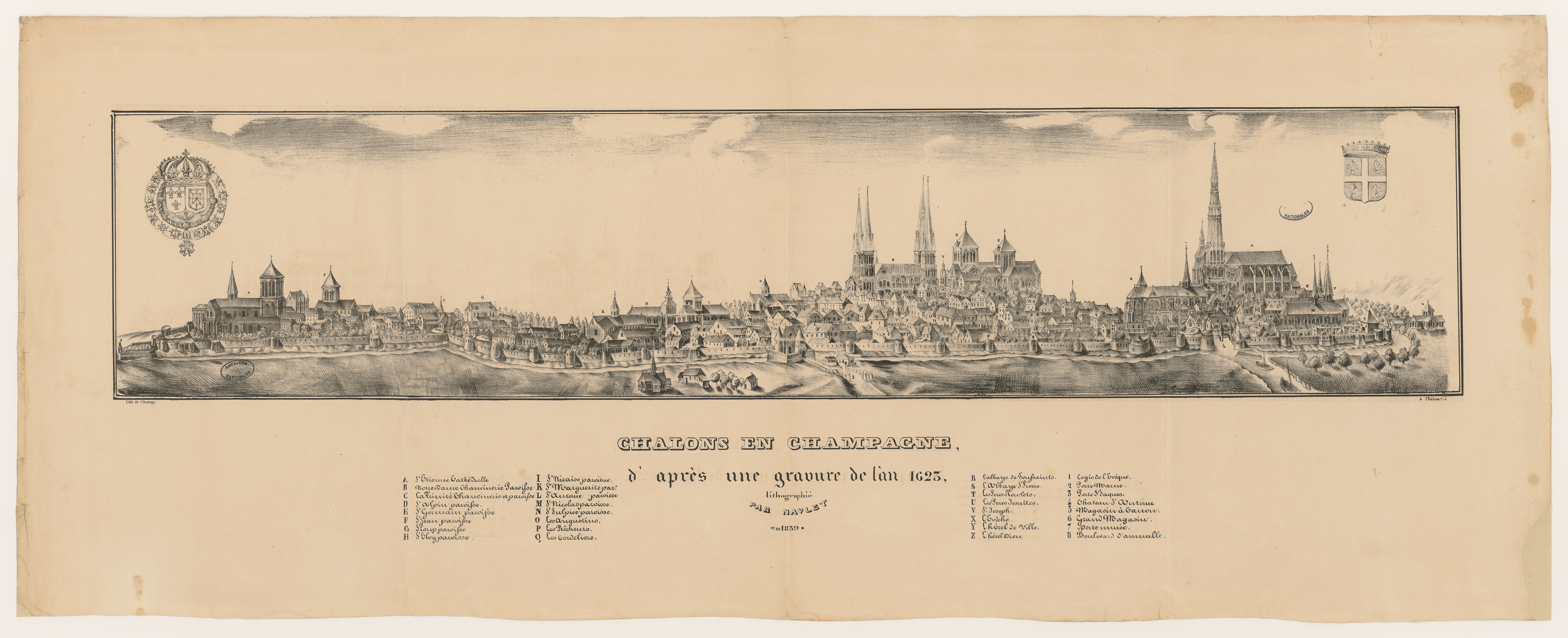
Châlons-en-Champagne in 1623

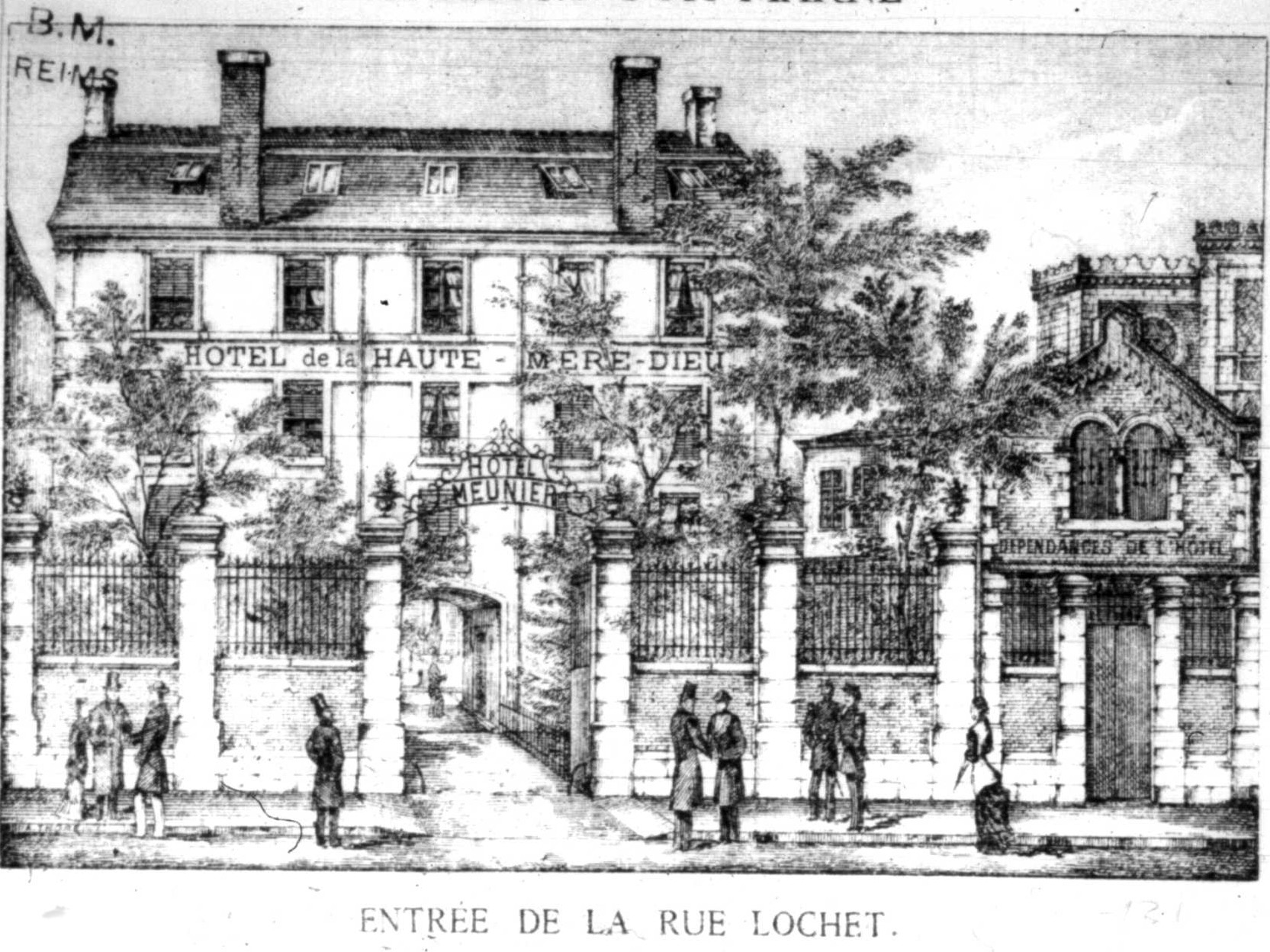
Hôtel de la Haute Mère Dieu in the 19th century

== Population ==
Historical population

Year	Pop.	±% p.a.
1793	12,139	—
1800	11,120	−1.24%
1806	11,089	−0.05%
1821	11,629	+0.32%
1831	12,413	+0.65%
1836	12,952	+0.85%
1841	14,100	+1.71%
1846	13,733	−0.53%
1851	15,879	+2.95%
1856	14,016	−2.47%
1861	14,786	+1.08%
1866	14,901	+0.16%
1872	15,198	+0.33%
1876	20,236	+7.42%
1881	23,199	+2.77%
1886	23,648	+0.38%
1891	25,863	+1.81%
1896	26,630	+0.59%
1901	26,737	+0.08%

Year	Pop.	±% p.a.
1906	27,808	+0.79%
1911	31,367	+2.44%
1921	31,194	−0.06%
1926	31,382	+0.12%
1931	32,307	+0.58%
1936	35,530	+1.92%
1946	31,120	−1.32%
1954	36,834	+2.13%
1962	41,705	+1.56%
1968	50,764	+3.33%
1975	52,275	+0.42%
1982	51,137	−0.31%
1990	48,423	−0.68%
1999	47,339	−0.25%
2007	45,829	−0.40%
2012	45,225	−0.26%
2017	44,753	−0.21%
2023	42,971	−0.67%

Source: EHESS and INSEE (1968–2023)

== Main sights ==
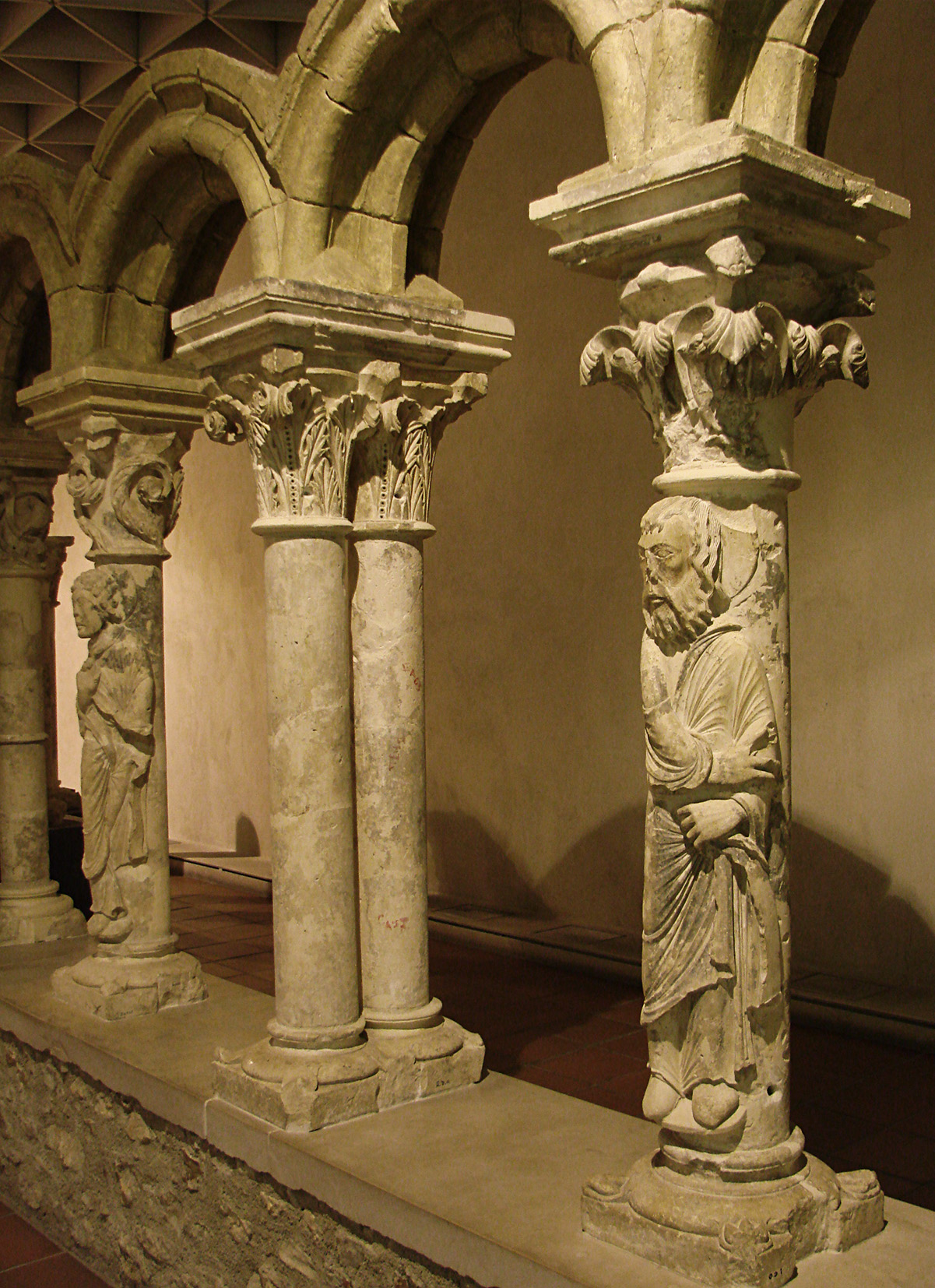
Cloister Notre-Dame-en-Vaux

- Châlons Cathedral, also known as Saint Étienne's cathedral, including parts of the first Romanesque cathedral built in the 12th century. Nevertheless, it was mainly rebuilt in Gothic style. The west façade (in Baroque style) and two close spans were added in the 17th century.
- Notre-Dame-en-Vaux church, part of the UNESCO World Heritage. Built between 1157 and 1217, the collegiate church had a cloister and was a place of pilgrimage in the 12th century, and Museum du Cloître de Notre-Dame-en-Vaux 12th century.
- Saint-Alpin, possibly the oldest church of the city. It was rebuilt around 1170 in a Gothic style, but still marked by the Romanesque style.
- The Hôtel de Ville (city hall) has a façade representative of the neo-classic period of the end of the 18th century. The steps of the building are protected by four stone lions.
- Porte Sainte-Croix (Sainte-Croix Gate), previously called Porte Dauphine, this gate was one of the entries into the city. It was dedicated to Marie Antoinette when she came via Châlons on her way to Paris to marry the future king Louis XVI.
- La Dernière Relève ("The Last Relief"), a war memorial next to the cathedral, with group of bronzes by French sculptor Gaston Broquet.
- The Ancien Hôtel des Intendants de Champagne (18th century), home to the prefecture of the former Champagne-Ardenne region and prefecture of Marne.
- Le Cirque, the old town circus, completed in 1899, is sheltering the Centre National des Arts du Cirque (CNAC).
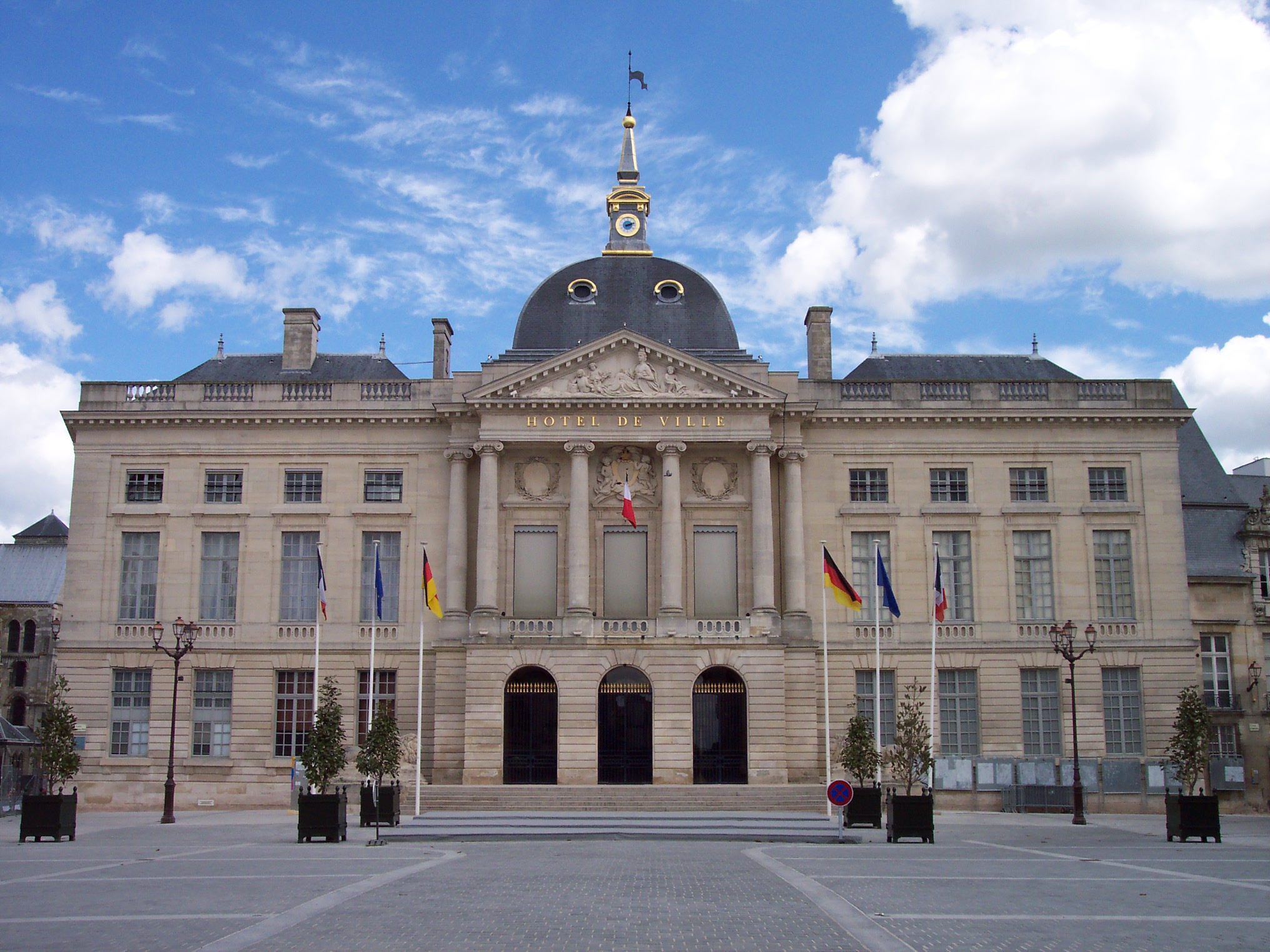
Hôtel de Ville

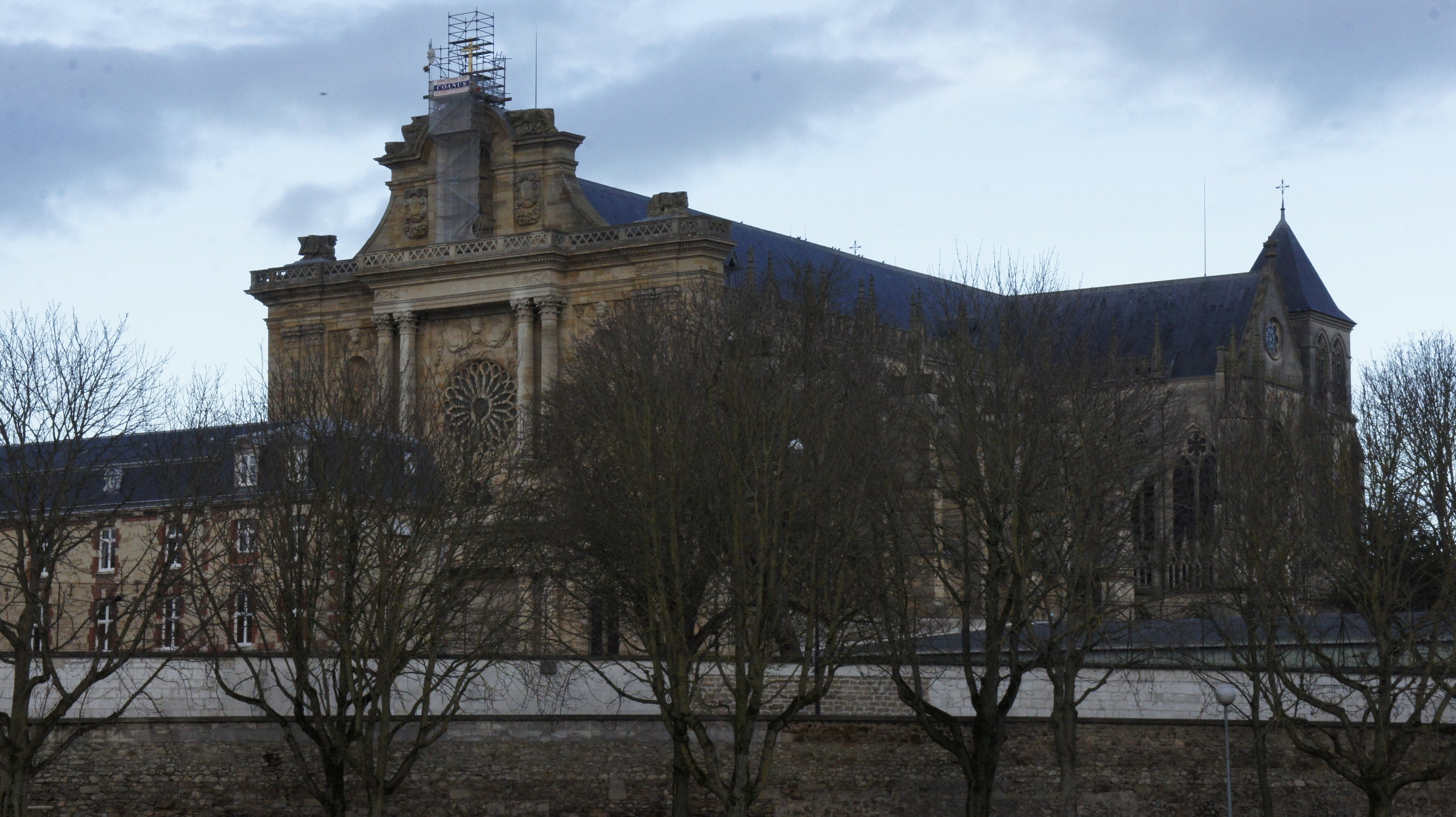
Châlons Cathedral

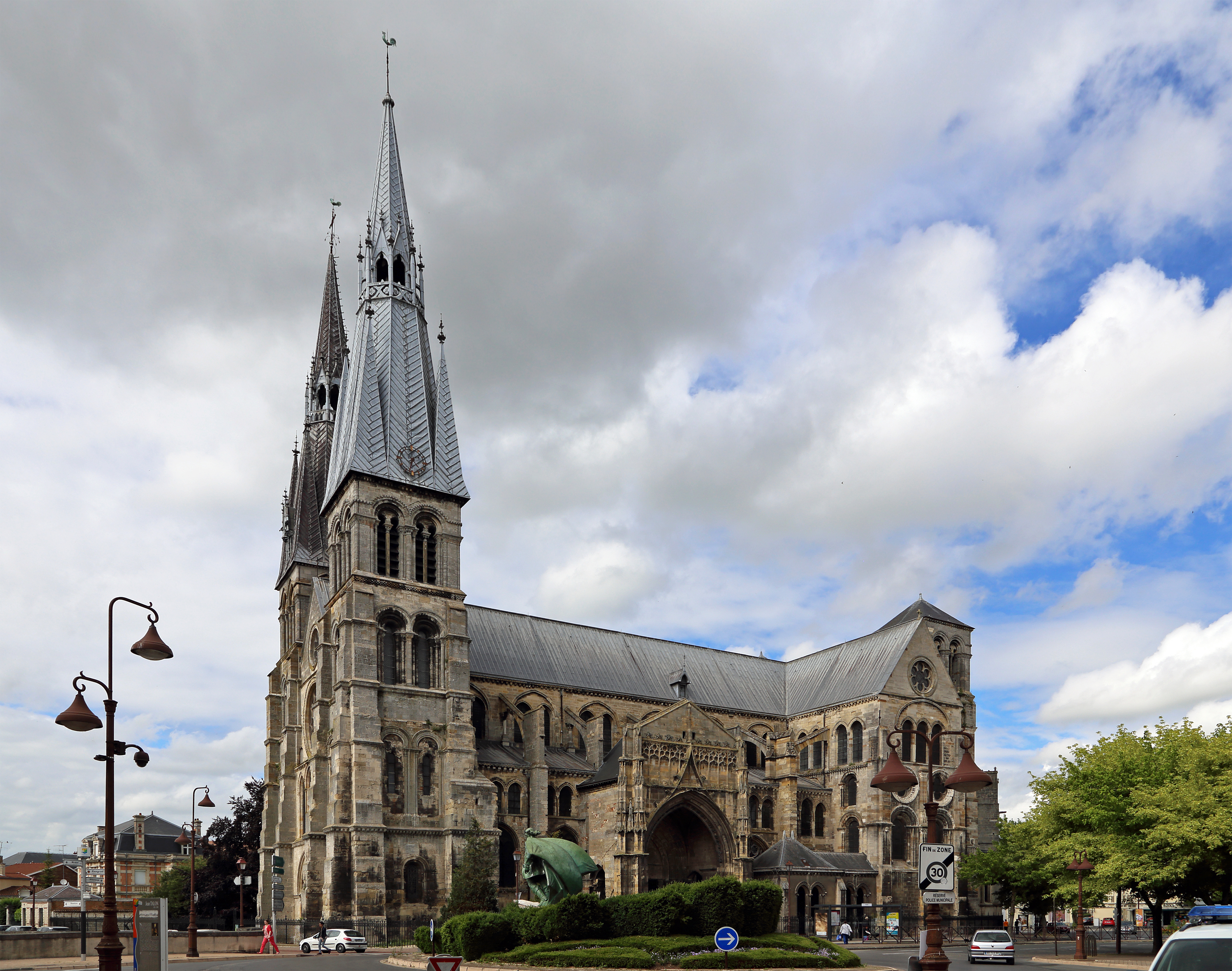
Notre-Dame-en-Vaux church

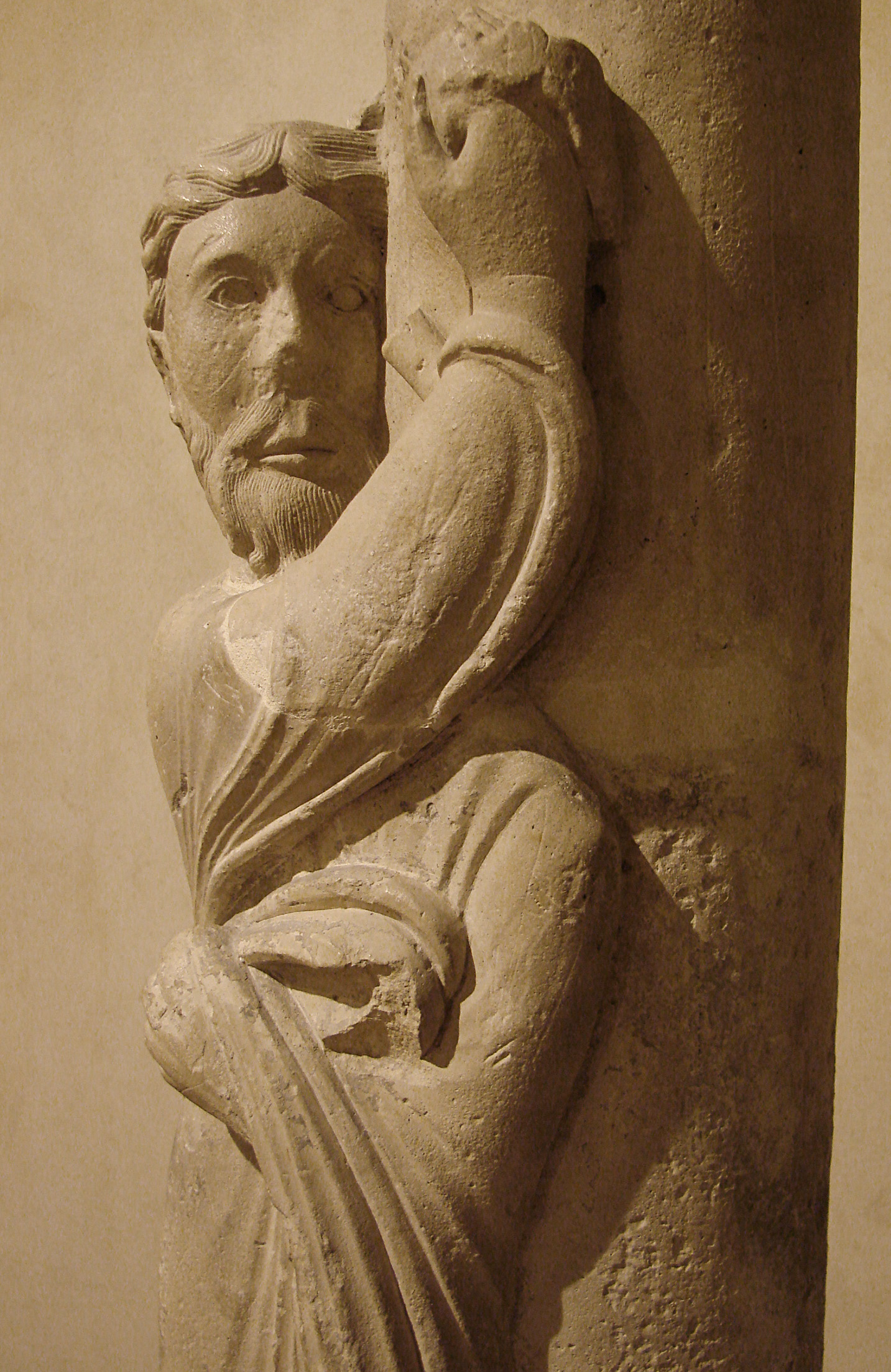
Cloister Notre-Dame-en-Vaux

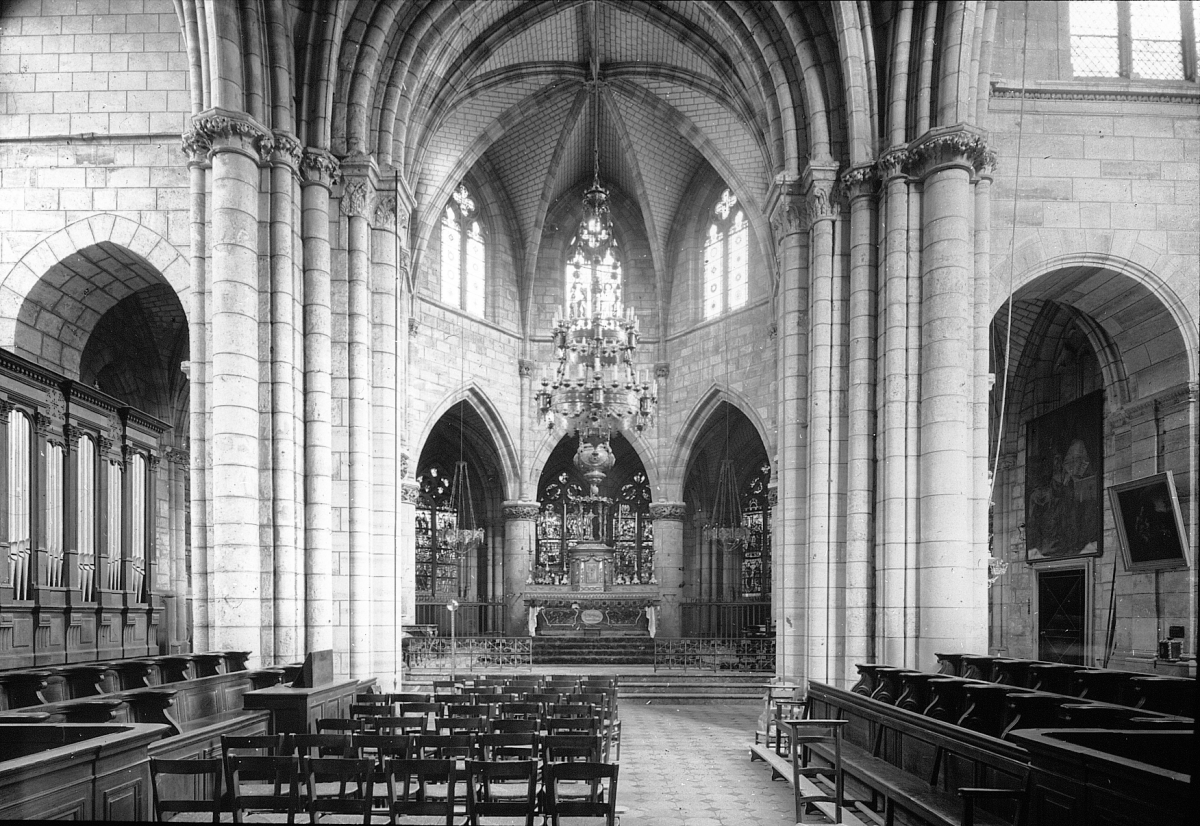
Interior view of Saint-Alpin (1907).

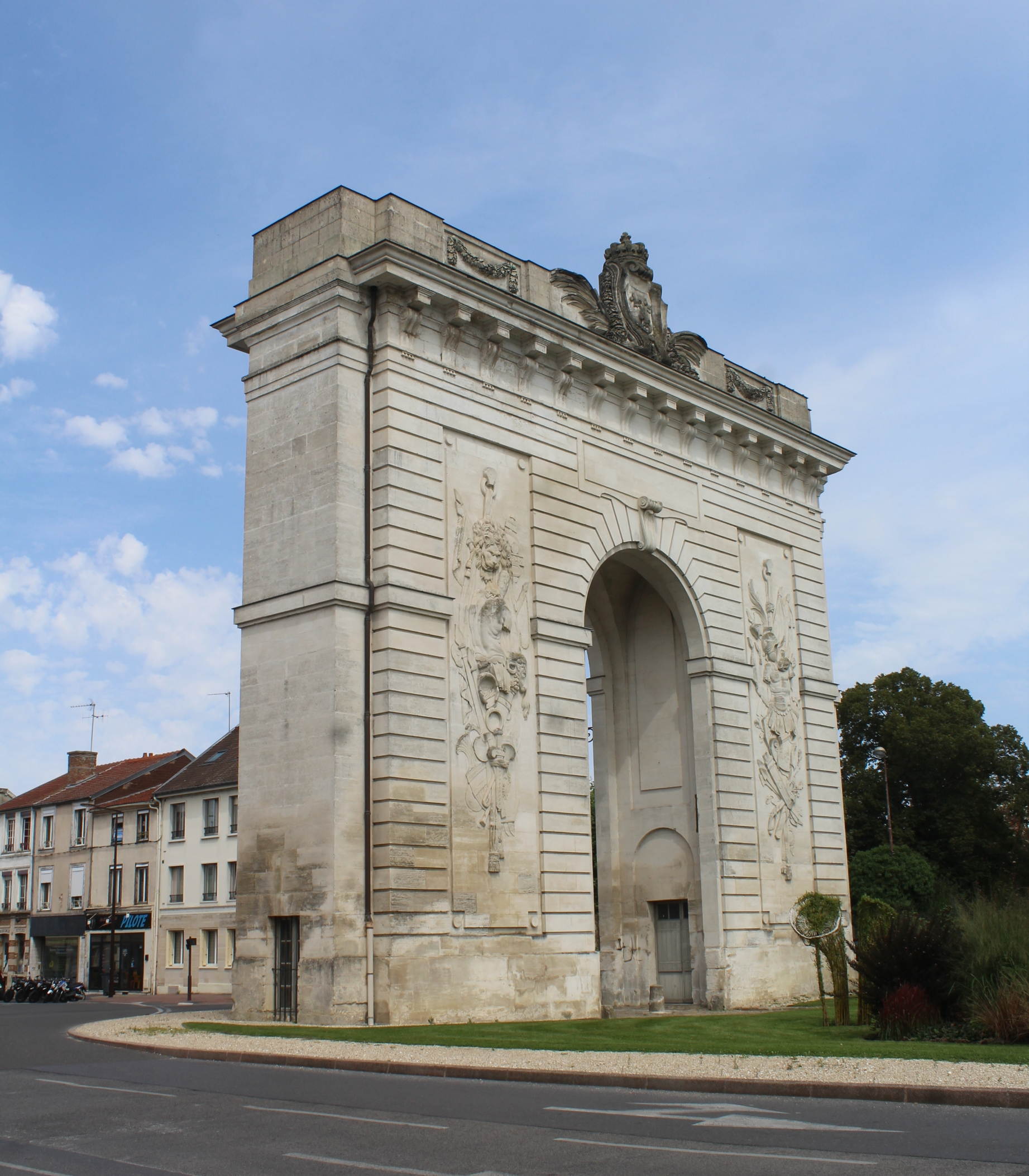
Sainte-Croix Gate

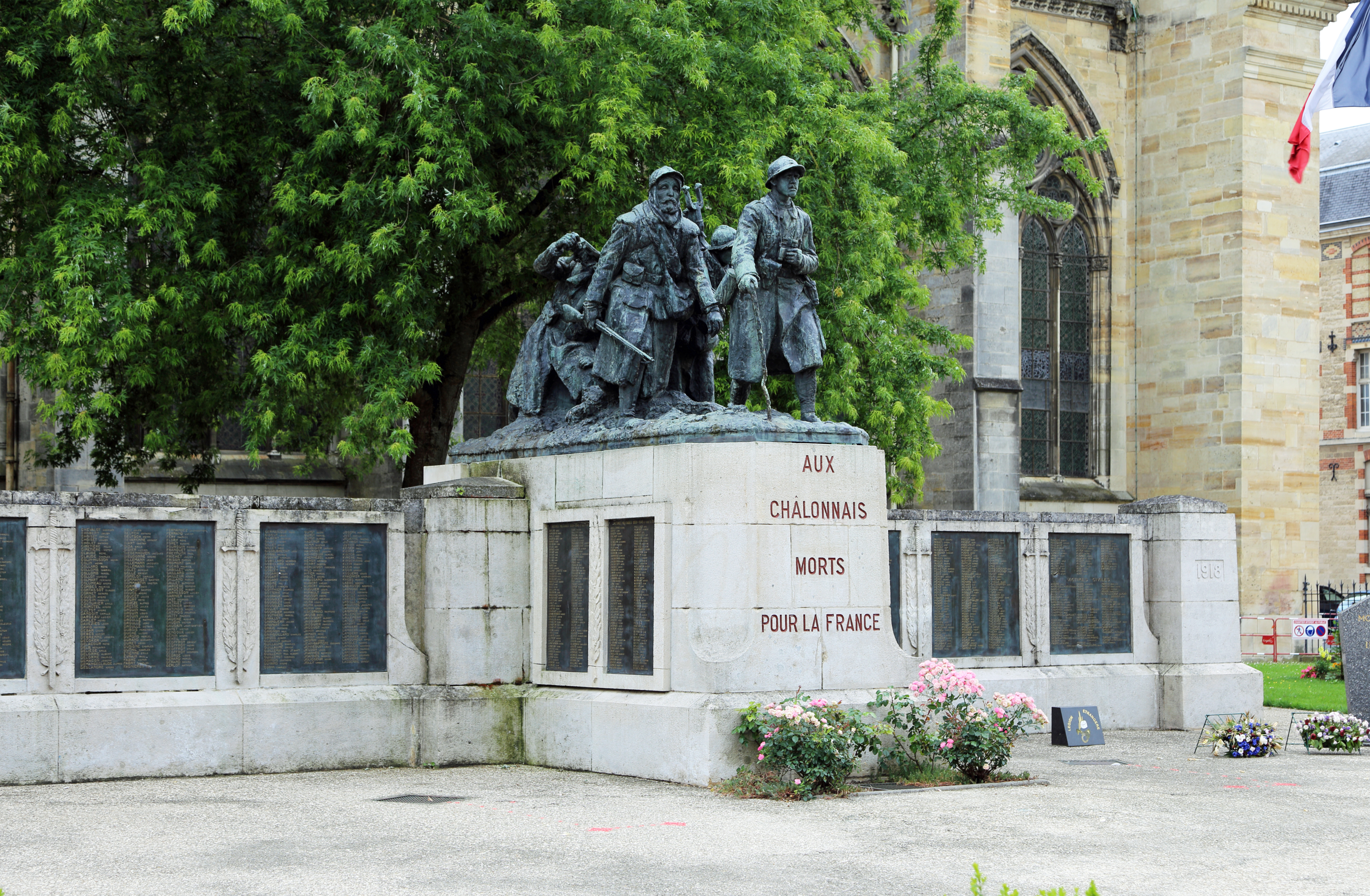
War memorial "The Last Relief"

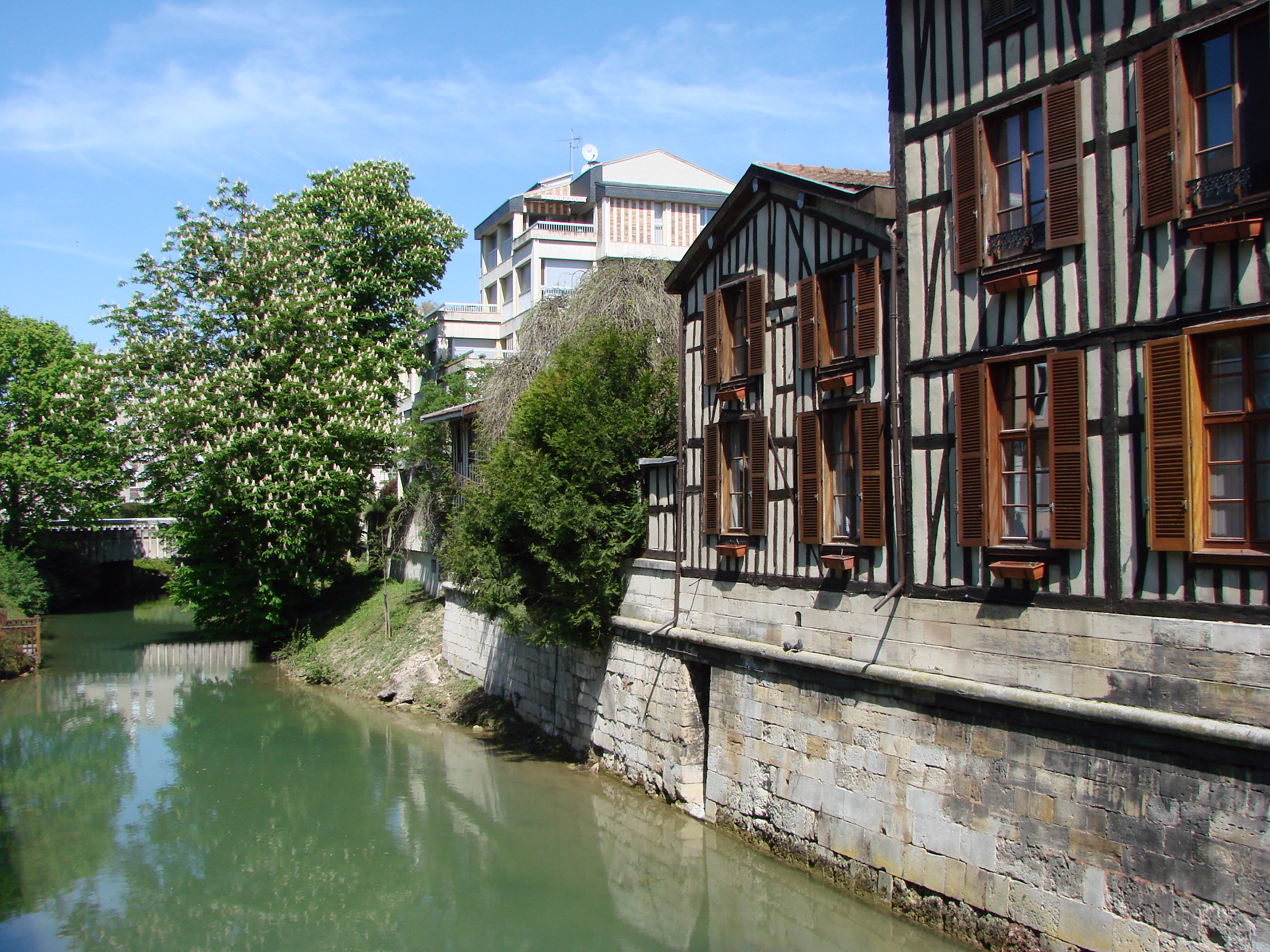
Old town of Châlons

== Transport ==
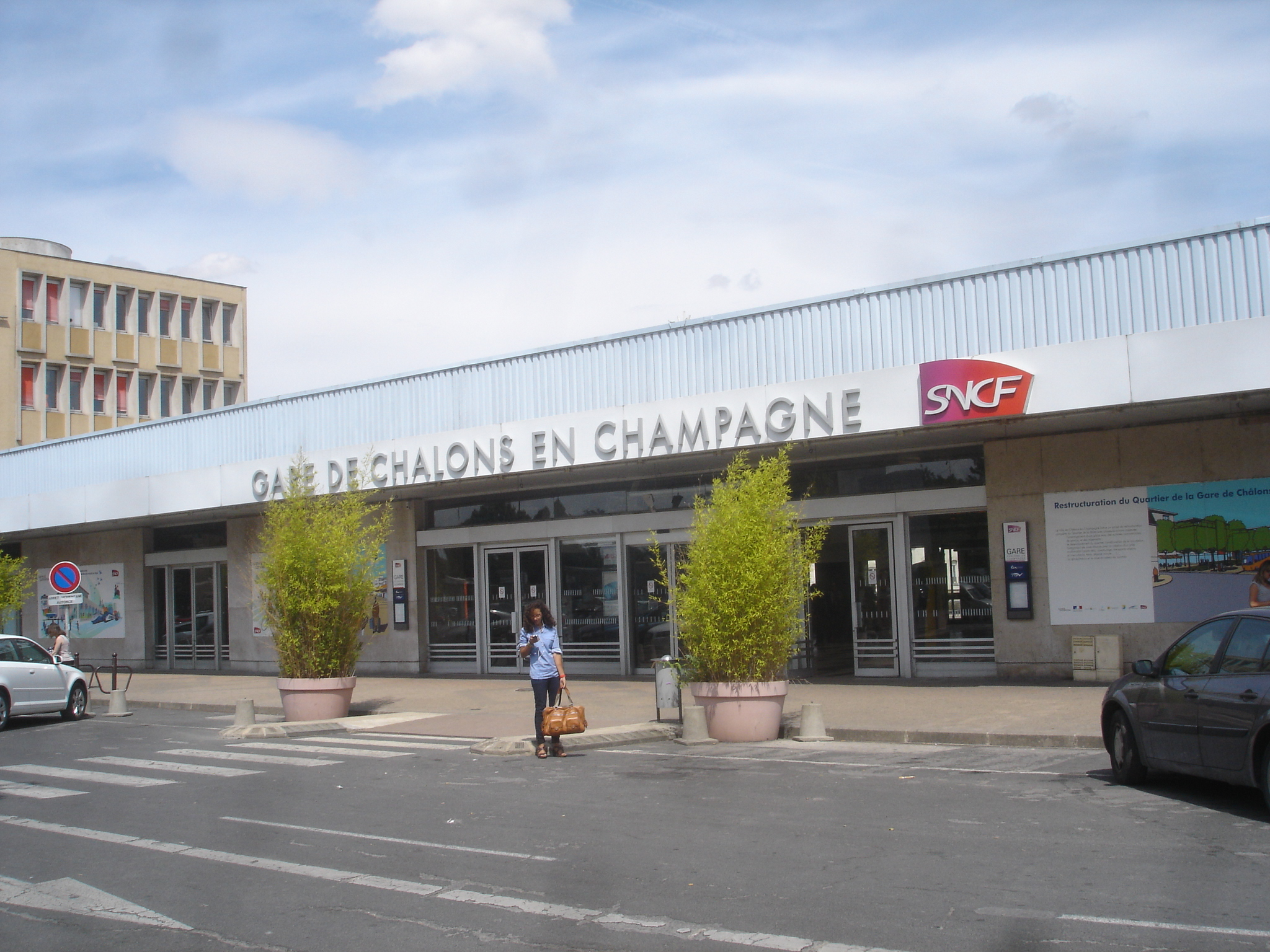
The station

Châlons-en-Champagne station is served by the TGV network with services to and from Paris's Gare de l'Est. Other destinations are Reims, Saint-Dizier, Nancy, Bar-le-Duc and Verdun. Additionally, Châlons is connected with Champagne-Ardenne TGV station, near Reims, with high-speed trains to Lille, Nantes, Rennes and Charles de Gaulle Airport.

Châlons is located at the intersection of two major axes:

- A4 motorway, going from Paris to Strasbourg, towards Reims and Metz
- A26 motorway, going from Lille to Lyon, towards Reims, Troyes and Dijon.

Châlons is also served by an international airport devoted to shipping (Châlons Vatry Airport), with an average of 16,0000 tons of freight passing through each year.

Local transportation is provided by SITAC BUS buses.

== Education ==
=== University level ===
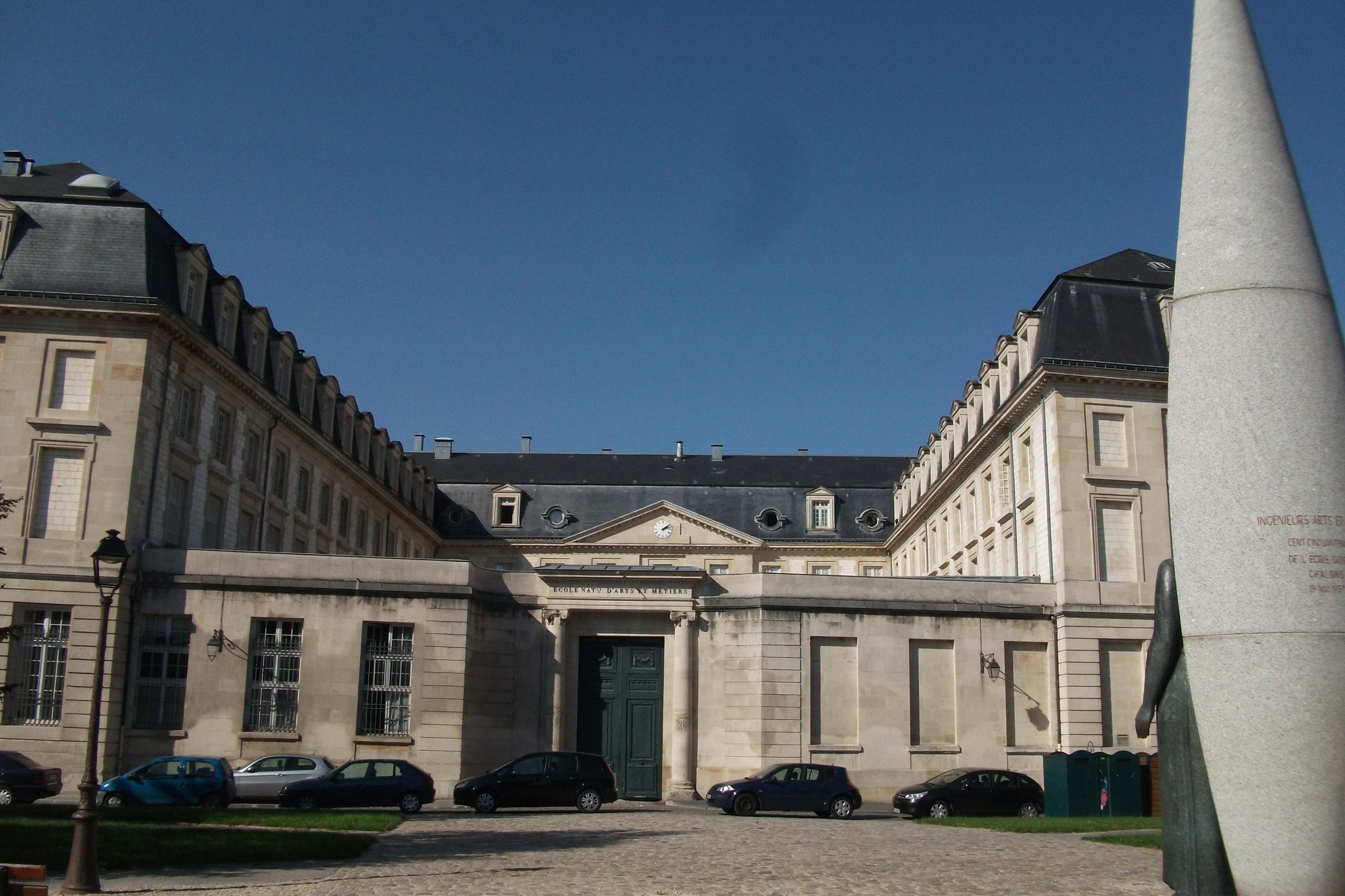
The Arts et Métiers ParisTech (1806).

- Arts et Métiers ParisTech (ENSAM), a national engineering graduate school. This teaching and research center was established in 1806. Students can attend courses focused on mechanical and industrial engineering.
- Centre national des arts du cirque (CNAC), which is a Circus Arts Learning Centre created in 1985. Each year about twenty students learn all the disciplines of modern circus arts.
- Institut Universitaire Technologique (IUT) of Reims, Châlons, Charleville, a branch of the University of Reims Champagne-Ardenne (URCA)
- Institut Universitaire de Formation des Maîtres (IUFM), a branch of the University of Reims Champagne-Ardenne (URCA)

== Sport ==
ESPE Basket Châlons-en-Champagne is a Châlons' basketball team. A temporary firing range was used for some shooting events at the 1924 Summer Olympics in Paris.

== Twin towns – sister cities ==
Châlons-en-Champagne is twinned with:

- Bobo-Dioulasso, Burkina Faso
- Ilkeston, England, United Kingdom
- Mirabel, Canada
- Neuss, Germany
- Razgrad, Bulgaria
- Wittenberge, Germany

== Camp de Mourmelon ==
The Camp de Mourmelon (formerly known as Camp de Châlons) is a military camp of circa 10,000 hectares located near Mourmelon-le-Grand 22 kilometres (14 miles) north. It was created at the behest of Napoleon III and opened 30 August 1857 during the Second French Empire.

The initial purpose was simply for practising military manoeuvres, but it quickly turned into a showcase of the French Imperial Army, a theatrical propaganda display, where French citizens could meet the army and watch parades. Each year the camp was transformed into a town of tents and wooden chalets.

The camp survived the fall of the Second Empire in 1870, but changed into a training camp and a departure point for troops engaging in overseas operations.

The camp is used for military manoeuvres, and cavalry training, along with the neighbouring, 2,500 hectare, Camp de Moronvillers. Firing of live ordnance (rockets, missiles) is prohibited.

== Notable people ==
=== Births ===
Châlons-en-Champagne was the birthplace of:

- Martin Akakia (1497–1551)
- Thierry Beschefer (1630–1711), Jesuit missionary
- David Blondel (1591–1655), Protestant clergyman
- Claude D'Espence (1511–1571) French theologian
- Jean Talon (1626–1694), first Intendant of New France
- Antoine de Chézy (1718–1798), hydraulics engineer
- Nicolas Appert (1749–1841), inventor of "appertisation" for the preservation of food
- Jean-Baptiste Charbonnier (1764–1859), composer and organist
- Joseph-François Mangin (1764–1818), designer of the St. Patrick's Old Cathedral and the New York City Hall
- Madeleine Chapelle (1782–1849), wife and model of the painter Jean-Auguste-Dominique Ingres
- Henri Dagonet (1823–1902), psychiatrist
- Adolphe Willette (1857–1926), painter
- Maurice Renard (1875–1939), writer
- Etienne Oehmichen (1884–1955), engineer, considered father of the helicopter
- Robert Louis Antral (1895–1939) painter
- Jacques Massu (1908–2002), paratrooper, general
- Cabu (1938–2015), comic strip artist and caricaturist
- Maryvonne de Saint-Pulgent (born 1951), senior civil servant and musicologist
- Mano Solo (1963–2010), singer
- Xavier Bertrand (born 1965), politician

=== Deaths ===
Châlons-en-Champagne was the deathplace of:

- Jean-Baptiste Charbonnier (1764–1859), composer and organist
- George Canning, 1st Baron Garvagh (1778–1840), diplomat and Fellow of the Royal Society of London, nephew to British Prime Minister George Canning (1770–1827)
- Clyde Fitch, American dramatist

== In popular culture ==
- It is the setting of the last operetta of Johann Strauss II, Die Göttin der Vernunft (The Goddess of Reason) (1897).
- The town is also mentioned in It's the Great Pumpkin, Charlie Brown as where Snoopy crashes his doghouse/"Sopwith Camel" in territory held by the Imperial German Army, after losing an imaginary aerial dogfight against the Red Baron.

== Panorama ==
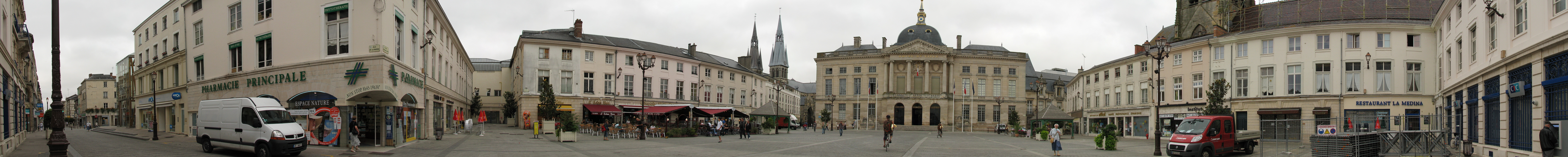
Panoramic view of the Hôtel de Ville on Place du Maréchal Foch in Châlons-en-Champagne

== Climate ==
Climate data for Châlons-en-Champagne (Fagnières) (1991–2020 normals, extremes 1970–present)
Month	Jan	Feb	Mar	Apr	May	Jun	Jul	Aug	Sep	Oct	Nov	Dec	Year
Record high °C (°F)	15.9 (60.6)	20.5 (68.9)	24.9 (76.8)	28.7 (83.7)	32.3 (90.1)	36.7 (98.1)	41.8 (107.2)	41.1 (106.0)	34.1 (93.4)	28.4 (83.1)	21.8 (71.2)	16.8 (62.2)	41.8 (107.2)
Mean daily maximum °C (°F)	6.2 (43.2)	7.6 (45.7)	12.0 (53.6)	16.0 (60.8)	19.7 (67.5)	23.1 (73.6)	25.9 (78.6)	25.6 (78.1)	21.2 (70.2)	16.0 (60.8)	10.0 (50.0)	6.7 (44.1)	15.8 (60.4)
Daily mean °C (°F)	3.4 (38.1)	4.1 (39.4)	7.3 (45.1)	10.4 (50.7)	14.1 (57.4)	17.2 (63.0)	19.6 (67.3)	19.4 (66.9)	15.7 (60.3)	11.7 (53.1)	6.9 (44.4)	4.1 (39.4)	11.2 (52.2)
Mean daily minimum °C (°F)	0.5 (32.9)	0.6 (33.1)	2.6 (36.7)	4.8 (40.6)	8.5 (47.3)	11.3 (52.3)	13.4 (56.1)	13.2 (55.8)	10.1 (50.2)	7.5 (45.5)	3.8 (38.8)	1.4 (34.5)	6.5 (43.7)
Record low °C (°F)	−21.0 (−5.8)	−14.6 (5.7)	−12.4 (9.7)	−5.2 (22.6)	−0.7 (30.7)	0.3 (32.5)	4.0 (39.2)	3.6 (38.5)	0.8 (33.4)	−4.0 (24.8)	−13.0 (8.6)	−18.0 (−0.4)	−21.0 (−5.8)
Average precipitation mm (inches)	49.4 (1.94)	44.1 (1.74)	43.7 (1.72)	43.4 (1.71)	55.2 (2.17)	56.5 (2.22)	56.2 (2.21)	56.5 (2.22)	49.0 (1.93)	59.5 (2.34)	55.4 (2.18)	63.4 (2.50)	632.3 (24.89)
Average precipitation days (≥ 1.0 mm)	10.9	10.1	9.6	8.4	9.8	9.0	8.2	8.1	7.7	9.8	10.8	12.0	114.5
Source: Meteociel

== See also ==
- Diocese of Châlons
- French wine
- Champagne Riots
- The works of Antonin Mercié
