= Madeleine Chapelle =

Spouse of Jean-Auguste-Dominique Ingres

Madame Jean-Auguste-Dominique Ingres
- Portrait of Madame Ingres by Jean Auguste-Dominque Ingres, 1815
- Born: Madeleine Chapelle; 1782
- Died: 27 July 1849 (aged 66–67)
- Spouse: Jean-Auguste-Dominique Ingres (married 1813–1849)
- Parent(s): Joseph-Mathieu-Lambert-Chapelle, Jeanne (née) Nicaise

Madame Jean-Auguste-Dominique Ingres (1782 – 27 July 1849), also known by her maiden name Madeleine Chapelle, was the first wife of Jean Auguste-Dominique Ingres, a French Neoclassical painter. Chapelle was the subject of a portrait painting and nine portrait drawings by Ingres and often served him as a figure model.

== Early life ==
Chapelle was born in Châlons-sur-Marne (now known as Châlons-en-Champagne) in 1782. She was the sixth and youngest child of the cabinetmaker Joseph-Mathieu-Lambert-Chapelle and Jeanne (née) Nicaise.

Chapelle had three brothers and two sisters, Marie and Sophie. Sophie married Pierre-Antoine Dubreuil, a musician, and settled in Guéret. When the couple's second child was born, Chapelle was sent for to look after the children. In Gueret, Chapelle worked as a cashier in a cafe and later ran her own linen shop.

== Marriage to Jean Auguste-Dominque Ingres ==
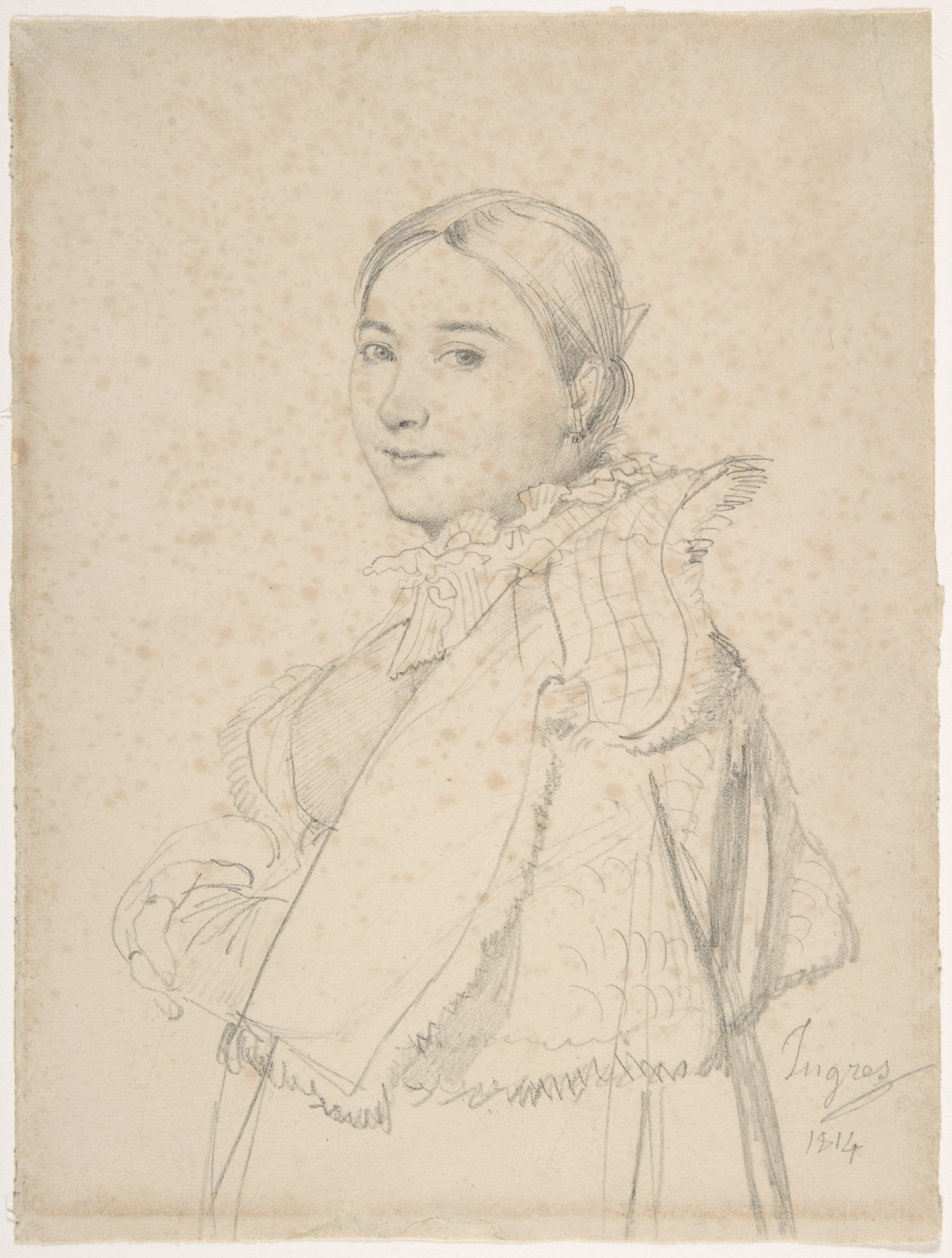
Sketch of Madame Jean-Auguste-Dominique Ingres, née Madeleine Chapelle by Ingres

Chapelle was introduced to the artist, Jean Auguste-Dominque Ingres, by her cousin, Adele. Ingres sent a letter to Chapelle dated 7 August 1813. In it he described his physical and personality traits.

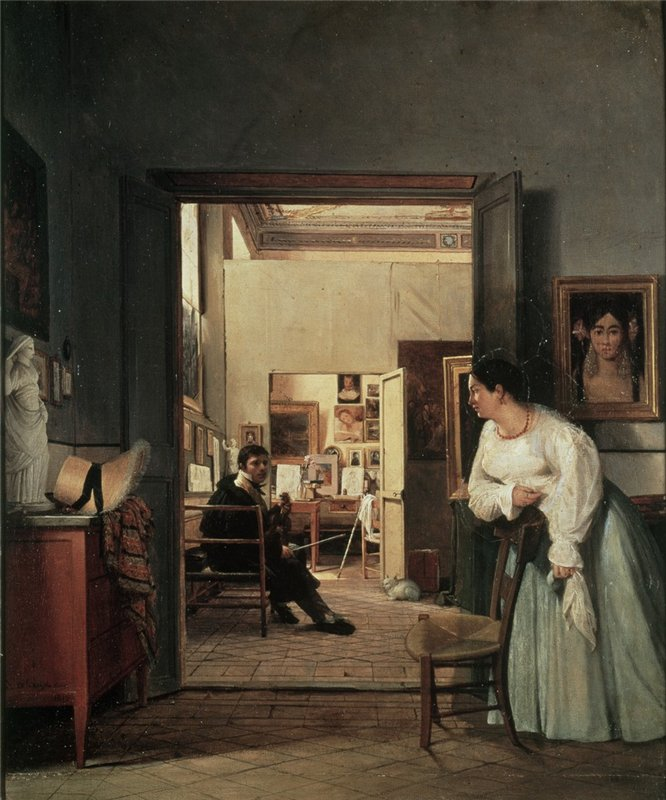
The Studio of Ingres in Rome by Jean Alaux, 1818. Madeleine is portrayed with her husband.

After further correspondence by letter, Chapelle travelled to Rome in September 1813 and the couple met for the first time at the Tomb of Nero. Chapelle and Ingres married on 4 December 1813 in the church of San Martino ai Monti. In letters sent to a friend, Ingres described their marriage as a happy one and expressed his devotion and adoration to his wife. Their only child was stillborn.

== Death ==
Chapelle took ill in May 1849 and died on 27 July 1849.
