= Martin Akakia =

French royal physician (1500–1551)

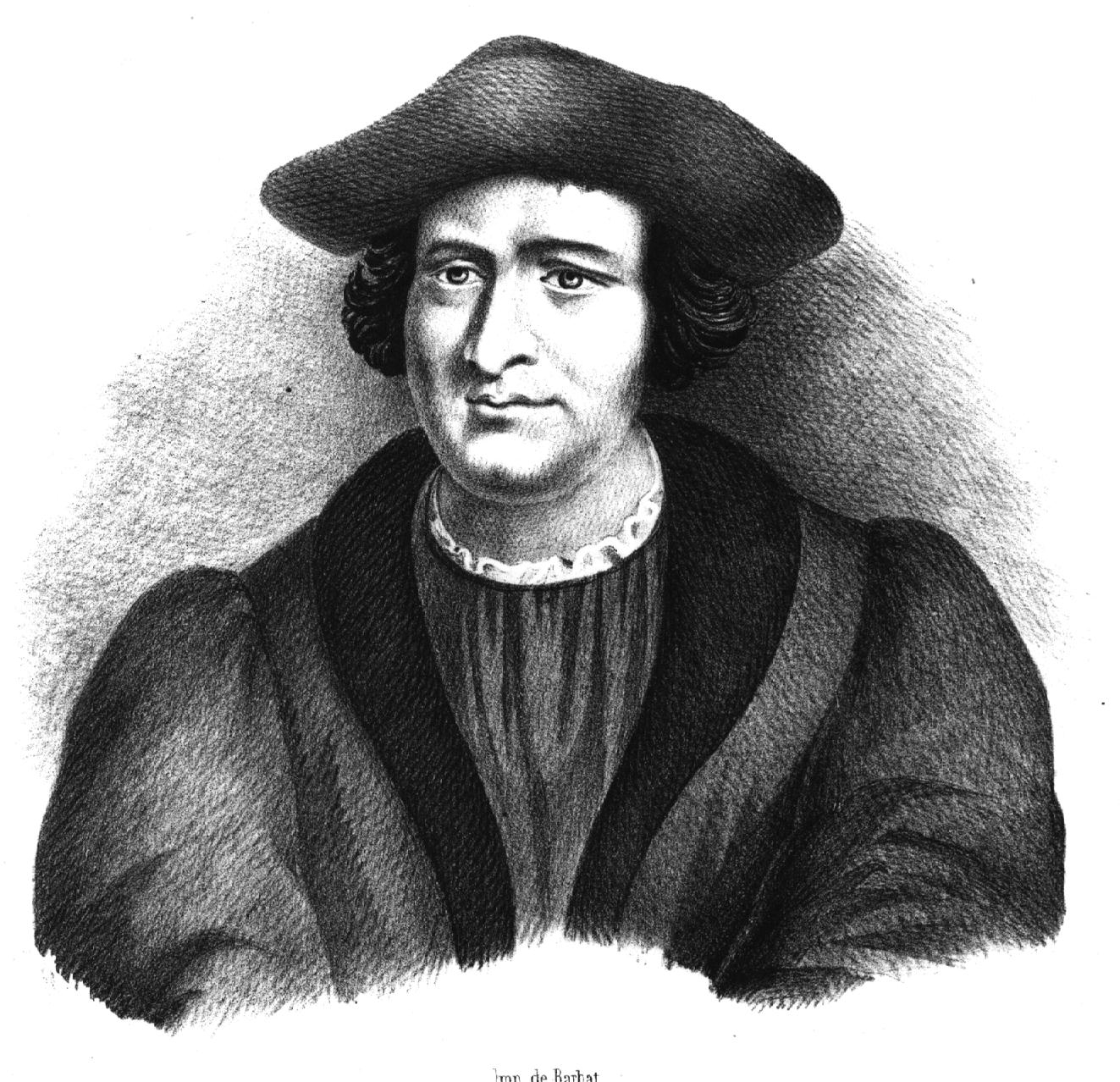
Martin Akakia, was a physician of King Francis I of France.

Martin Akakia (1497–1551) was a physician of King Francis I of France. He was born at Châlons-en-Champagne, his real name being Aquaquia. He later adopted the name "Akakia," the Greek form of his name, following a common scholarly practice of the time to Latinize or Hellenize names. The name "Akakia" was later immortalized by Voltaire in his satirical writings, where he used it for a character described as a "pretended physician to the Pope," featured in a diatribe against Maupertuis. Martin Akakia in the image, is depicted as wearing a traditional scholar's Cap, a soft, rounded hat commonly associated with academics and intellectuals of the Renaissance period. This cap symbolized his learned status and complemented his formal robes, which were layered and high-collared, typical of the era's professional attire. This attire he is wearing helps allow people to see his role not only as a physician and that he is dedicated to academics.
