= Willem van Bemmel =

Dutch Golden Age landscape painter

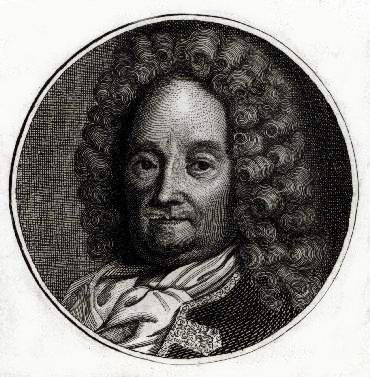
Willem van Bemmel by Christoph Wilhelm Bock (1755-1836)

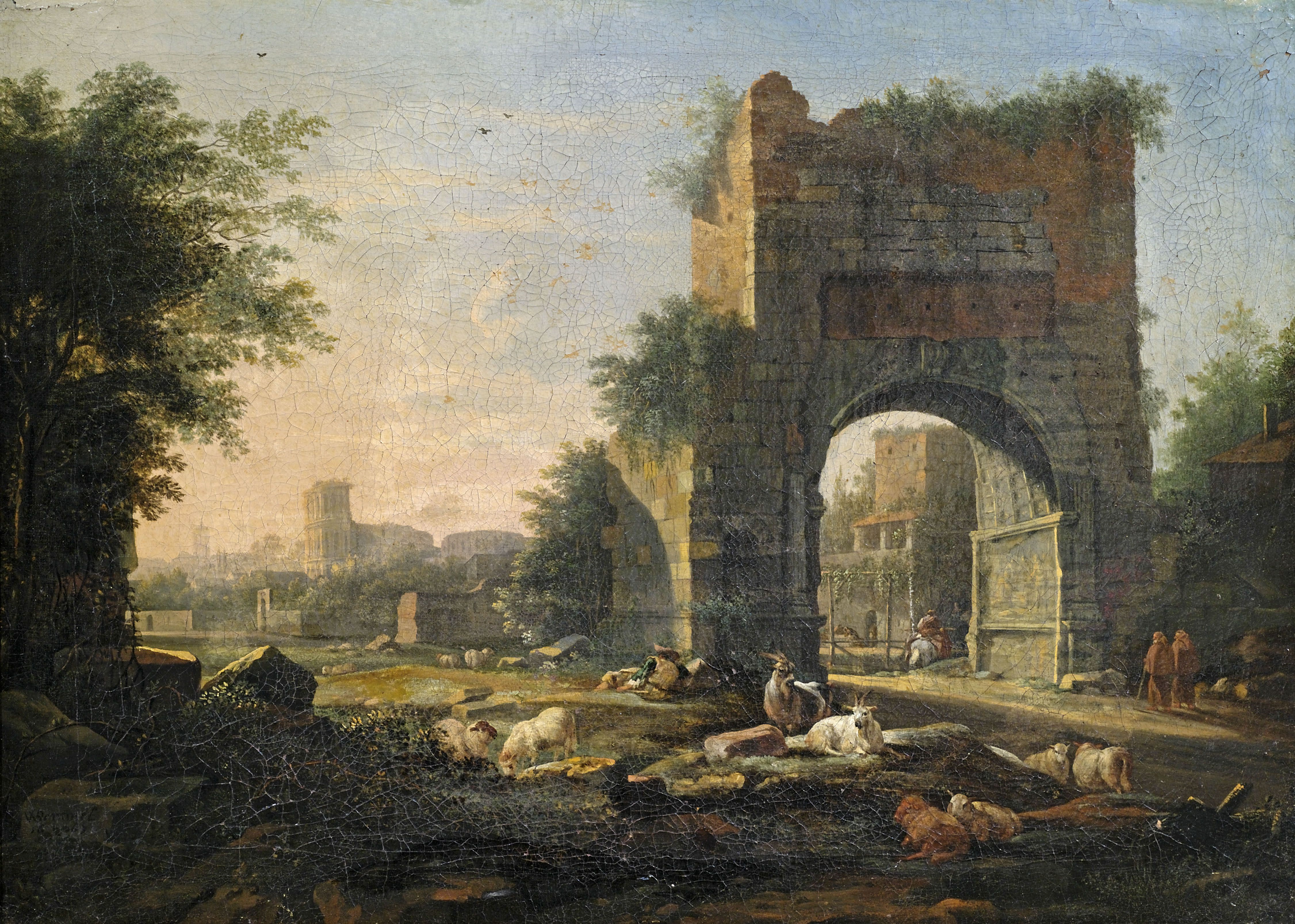
Italianate landscape, 1667

Willem van Bemmel, or Guillaume, or Wilhelm von Bemmel (10 June 1630 – 20 December 1708), was a Dutch Golden Age landscape painter who moved to Germany.

He was born in Utrecht, where he was a student of Herman Saftleven. He made a Grand Tour to Rome, spending first the years 1647–9 in Venice before moving to Rome where he stayed for six years and became a member of the Bentvueghels. From Rome he crossed the Alps to Nuremberg. He died in Nuremberg, aged 78.

According to the RKD he was the younger brother of the landscape painter Jacob Gerritsz van Bemmel (1628-1673) in Utrecht, and they both studied under Saftleven in the years 1645–1647. He travelled to Italy, spending first the years 1647–9 in Venice, 1649–1653 in Rome (with trips to Naples), and then spending some time in London before moving to Kassel during the period 1656–1662. In 1662 he moved to Augsburg for a short period before moving to Nuremberg, where he married and settled. The Nuremberg engraver Christoph Wilhelm Bock made a portrait of him there. He is known for his Italianate landscapes. He was the father of the German Von Bemmel painting family of Nuremberg.
