= 1630 Crete earthquake =

Natural disaster

The 1630 Crete earthquake reportedly occurred at around 09:00 on 9 March 1630 in the Kythira Strait, off the coast of Crete. Until the mid-1990s, the earthquake had traditionally been referred to as the 1629 Crete earthquake, which had been documented to have occurred at about 10:00 on Saturday 27 February 1629. Extensive research by several experts on the subject since the late 1980s has revealed that a calculation error mis-dated the occurrence by several days and a year.

== Background ==
The exact epicentre of the earthquake is unknown, although it has been cited to have been in the Kythira Strait. The Venetians, who ruled Crete at the time, recorded it as a major earthquake, and it has been cited as one of three major earthquakes to have taken place in the Antikythira seismic gap, the others occurring in 1750 and 1798.

== Description ==
Greek seismological reports indicated that the earthquake occurred on 27 February 1629, resulting in extensive losses to property in much of Crete, and also causing a few deaths in Heraklion, where houses fell down, trapping people. Churches experienced significant damage. In 1893, De Viazis unearthed a series of official documents of the Venetian Administration of Zakynthos revealing that three captains sailing independently in the strait at the time of the earthquake had reported their observations, which was in the form of tsunami waves travelling in the direction of south and southeast posing threats to their ships. Two reported the "remnants of wrecks and bodies of shipwrecked persons" and ships being affected by a tsunami. Another captain who had landed on the coast of Kythira stated that the people on the island had also experienced earthquake shocks at the same time as the captains had experienced it in the sea, and that it had resulted in some degree of flooding near the pier of the harbour.

== Recent findings and corrections ==
In 1988, K. G. Tsiknakis published in the Cretica Chronica two previously unpublished accounts of the earthquake. In 1994, after conducting further research, Tsiknakis stated that he believed the previously established year of the earthquake was wrong, and it was in fact 1630. In 1997 and 2003, Papazachos and Papazachou stated that they believed the date was 10 March 1630, which has since been moved back a day. In 2010, Papadopoulos and others reported that tsunamis had been recorded when strong earthquakes struck the area between the Peloponnese and Crete, not only on 9 March 1630 but also on 6 February 1866, and 20 September 1867.
