= Catherine Duchemin =

French artist (1630–1698)

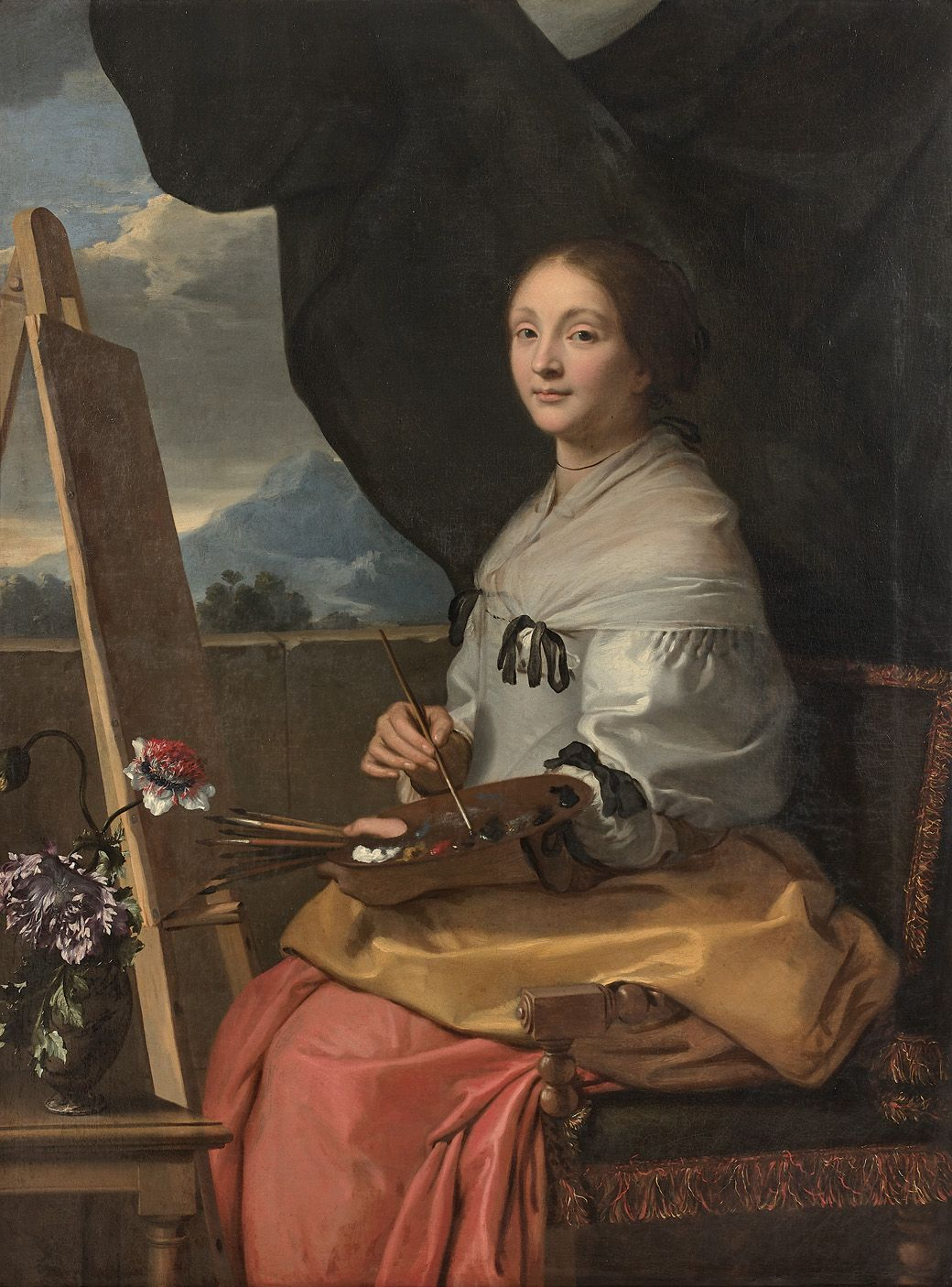
- Portrait of Catherine Duchemin before her easel
- Born: 12 November 1630; Paris, France
- Died: 21 September 1698 (aged 67); Paris, France
- Known for: Painting
- Spouse: François Girardon (m. 1657)

Catherine Duchemin (French pronunciation: [katʁin dyʃəmɛ̃]; 12 November 1630 – 21 September 1698) was a French flower and fruit painter.

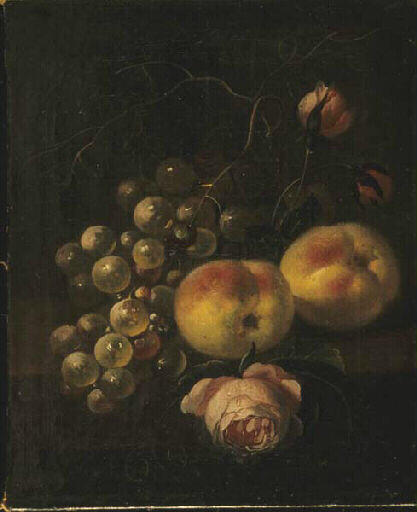
Still Life

She was born in Paris as the daughter of the sculptor Jaques Duchemin and Elizabeth Hubault. She married the sculptor Girardon in 1657, and 14 April 1663 was received into the Academy as the first lady on whom this honour had been conferred. Her reception piece was a flower still-life. Her portrait was painted by Sébastien Bourdon, whose portrait she also painted. The portrait of her by Bourdon was shown at the Paris Exposition Universelle (1878), "Les Portraits nationaux", palais du Trocadéro.

She had around 10 children which probably affected her productivity as a painter. She died in Paris.
