= Thierry Beschefer =

Thierry Beschefer, sometimes given as "Theodore" (25 March 1630 – 4 February 1711), was a Jesuit missionary and became the superior of the Canadian mission.

== Life ==
Thierry Beschefer was born at Châlons-sur-Marne on 25 May 1630 and entered the Society of Jesus at Nancy on 24 May 1647. He studied philosophy and theology at Pont-à-Mousson,¸and taught humanities and rhetoric for seven years at various colleges in France. He was ordained in 1661. He returned to Pont-à-Mousson to teach rhetoric and then classics at Metz. He made his profession as a Jesuit in August 1664.

The following year, Beschefer went to Canada. Upon his arrival at Quebec, the Jesuit superiors set him to learn the Huron language. He remained in Quebec for three years. In July 1666, he was part of a delegation sent by Governor Alexandre de Prouville de Tracy to the English at New York, but a sudden outbreak of Indian hostilities compelled them to turn back. In 1670–1671, however, he was sent to assist Jean Pierron at a mission among the Mohawks. That assignment proved particularly challenging due to the influence of the Dutch and English traders at Fort Orange, who supplied the tribe with liquor.

In 1672, Beschefer returned to Quebec, where he performed a variety of functions. He became superior of the Canadian missions in 1680 and retained that office until 1686, when he became prefect the College of Quebec. In 1689, he returned to France, where he acted as procurator of the missions. In 1691, he embarked at La Rochelle for Quebec but had to forego the voyage because of ill health.

During his stay in Canada, he was the spiritual director of the Ursulines at Quebec, and their annals describe him as "a man of distinguished merit, and a director of great wisdom and experience."

He died in Reims on 4 February 1711 at the age of eighty.
