= Sibbald baronets of Rankelour (1630) =

Escutcheon of the Sibbald baronets of Rankelour

The Sibbald Baronetcy, of Rankelour in the County of Fife, was a title in the Baronetage of Nova Scotia. It was created on 24 July 1630 for James Sibbald. The title became dormant on the death of the second Baronet c. 1680.

== Sibbald baronets, of Rankelour (1630) ==
- Sir James Sibbald, 1st Baronet (died 1650)
- Sir David Sibbald, 2nd Baronet (died c. 1680)
