= Pitiscus =

Pitiscus is a surname. Notable people with the surname include:

- Bartholomaeus Pitiscus (1561–1613), German trigonometrist, astronomer, and theologian
- Samuel Pitiscus (1637–1727), Dutch historian and classicist, nephew of Bartholomaeus

== See also ==
- Pitiscus (crater)
