= 1637 =

1637 in various calendars
| Gregorian calendar | 1637; MDCXXXVII |
| Ab urbe condita | 2390 |
| Armenian calendar | 1086; ԹՎ ՌՁԶ |
| Assyrian calendar | 6387 |
| Balinese saka calendar | 1558–1559 |
| Bengali calendar | 1043–1044 |
| Berber calendar | 2587 |
| English Regnal year | 12 Cha. 1 – 13 Cha. 1 |
| Buddhist calendar | 2181 |
| Burmese calendar | 999 |
| Byzantine calendar | 7145–7146 |
| Chinese calendar | 丙子年 (Fire Rat); 4334 or 4127 — to — 丁丑年 (Fire Ox); 4335 or 4128 |
| Coptic calendar | 1353–1354 |
| Discordian calendar | 2803 |
| Ethiopian calendar | 1629–1630 |
| Hebrew calendar | 5397–5398 |
- Hindu calendars
| Vikram Samvat | 1693–1694 |
| Shaka Samvat | 1558–1559 |
| Kali Yuga | 4737–4738 |
| Holocene calendar | 11637 |
| Igbo calendar | 637–638 |
| Iranian calendar | 1015–1016 |
| Islamic calendar | 1046–1047 |
| Japanese calendar | Kan'ei 14 (寛永１４年) |
| Javanese calendar | 1558–1559 |
| Julian calendar | Gregorian minus 10 days |
| Korean calendar | 3970 |
| Minguo calendar | 275 before ROC 民前275年 |
| Nanakshahi calendar | 169 |
| Thai solar calendar | 2179–2180 |
| Tibetan calendar | མེ་ཕོ་བྱི་བ་ལོ་ (male Fire-Rat); 1763 or 1382 or 610 — to — མེ་མོ་གླང་ལོ་ (female Fire-Ox); 1764 or 1383 or 611 |

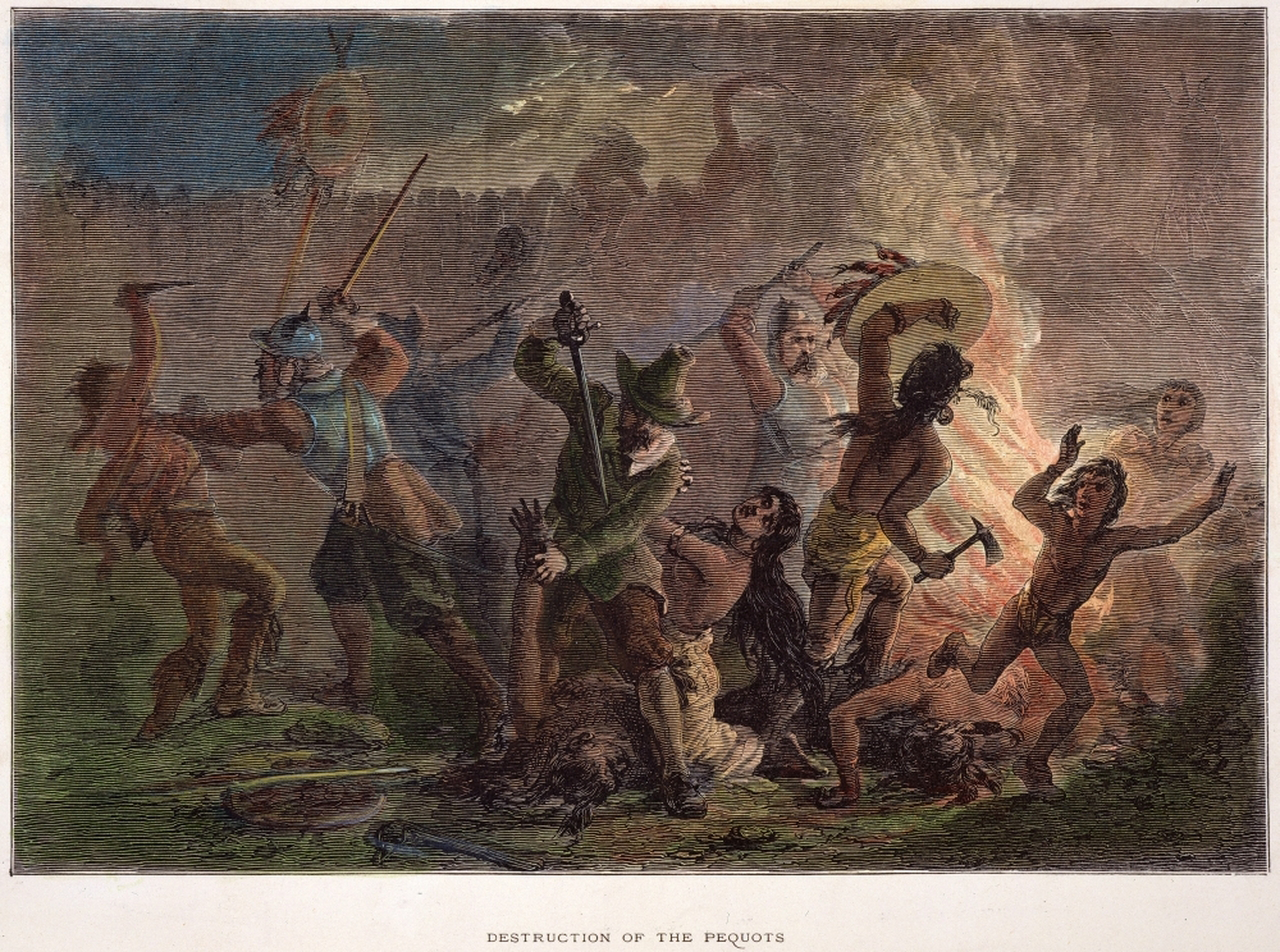
May 26: The Mystic massacre: At least 400 members of the Pequot Indian tribe are killed by English settlers and their Narragansett and Mohican allies, in what is now the U.S. state of Connecticut.

1637 (MDCXXXVII) was a common year starting on Thursday of the Gregorian calendar and a common year starting on Sunday of the Julian calendar, the 1637th year of the Common Era (CE) and Anno Domini (AD) designations, the 637th year of the 2nd millennium, the 37th year of the 17th century, and the 8th year of the 1630s decade. As of the start of 1637, the Gregorian calendar was 10 days ahead of the Julian calendar, which remained in localized use until 1923.

== Events ==
=== January–March ===
- January 5 – Pierre Corneille's tragicomedy Le Cid is first performed, in Paris, France.
- January 16 – The siege of Nagpur ends in the modern-day Maharashtra state of India, as Kok Shah, the King of Deogarh, surrenders his kingdom to the Mughal Empire.
- January 23 – John Maurice, Prince of Nassau-Siegen arrives from the Netherlands to become the Governor of Dutch Brazil, and extends the range of the colony over the next six years.
- January 28 – Qing invasion of Joseon: The Manchu armies of China complete their invasion of northern Korea with the surrender of King Injo of the Joseon Kingdom.
- February 3 – Tulip mania collapses in the Dutch Republic.
- February 15 – Ferdinand III becomes Holy Roman Emperor upon the death of his father, Ferdinand II, although his formal coronation does not take place until later in the year.
- February 18 – Eighty Years' War: Battle off Lizard Point – Off the coast of Cornwall, England, a Spanish fleet intercepts an Anglo-Dutch merchant convoy of 44 vessels escorted by six warships, destroying or capturing 20 of them.
- March 6 – The world's first opera house, Teatro San Cassiano, opens in Venice with the premiere of L'Andromeda, with music by Francesco Manelli and libretto by Benedetto Ferrari.
- March 25 – The Blessed Virgin is proclaimed Queen of Genoa.

=== April–June ===
- April 10 – Plymouth Colony grants the "tenn menn of Saugust" a new settlement on Cape Cod, later named Sandwich, Massachusetts.
- April 30 – King Charles I of England issues a proclamation, attempting to stem emigration to the North American colonies.
- May 26 – Pequot War: Mystic massacre – A band of English settlers under Captain John Mason, and their Narragansett and Mohegan allies, set fire to a fortified village of the Mashantucket Pequot Tribe near the Mystic River. Between 400 and 700 people, mostly women, children and old men, are killed.
- May – Chinese encyclopedist Song Yingxing publishes his Tiangong Kaiwu ("Exploitation of the Works of Nature"), considered one of the most valuable encyclopedias of classical China.
- June 27 – The first English venture to China is attempted by Captain John Weddell, who sails into port in Macau and Canton during the late Ming dynasty with six ships. The voyages are for trade, which is dominated here by the Portuguese (at this time combined with the power of Spain). He brings 38,421 pairs of eyeglasses, perhaps the first recorded European-made eyeglasses to enter China.

=== July–September ===
- July 23
  - After a court battle, King Charles I of England hands over title to the North American colony of Massachusetts to Sir Ferdinando Gorges, one of the founders of Plymouth Council for New England.
  - Introduction of a new Scottish Prayer Book is met with widespread demonstrations, notably that of Jenny Geddes at St Giles' Cathedral, Edinburgh, who is said to have thrown a stool at the Dean's head.
- August 16 – Adam Olearius, sent along with Philipp Crusius and Otto Bruggemann by the German Duke of Holstein-Gottorp to establish a trade deal with Persia, is welcomed by the Safavid ruler, the Shah Safi at the Persian capital, Isfahan.
- August 25 – Eighty Years' War: A force of 17,000 Spanish troops, led by the Spanish Netherlands Governor-General, Don Fernando de Austria, recaptures the city of Venlo from the Dutch Republic after a five-day siege.
- August 29 – Fighting in the modern-day West African nation of Ghana, troops of the Dutch West India Company capture the Portuguese territory of the Gold Coast after the five-day Battle of Elmina.
- September 29 – The last five of the "16 Martyrs of Japan" are executed for illegally attempting to spread Christianity in Japan. Lorenzo Ruiz, Guillaume Courtet, Michael de Aozaraza, Vincent Shiwozuka and Lazarus of Kyoto are all put to death by the slow hanging torture of ana-tsurushi. They will be canonized 350 years later as saints of the Roman Catholic Church, on October 18, 1987.

=== October–December ===
- October 13 – English Royal Navy first-rate ship of the line Sovereign of the Seas is launched at Woolwich Dockyard at a cost of £65,586, adorned from stern to bow with gilded carvings, after a design by Anthony van Dyck.
- November 18 – The coronation as the new Holy Roman Emperor of Ferdinand III, Archduke of Austria, King of Hungary, Croatia and Bohemia, takes place in Vienna.
- December 17 – The Shimabara Rebellion erupts in Japan, when 30,000 peasants in the heavily Catholic area of northern Kyūshū revolt.

=== Date unknown ===
- Pierre de Fermat makes a notation, in a document margin, claiming to have proof of what will become known as Fermat's Last Theorem.
- René Descartes promotes intellectual rigour in his Discourse on the Method, and introduces the Cartesian coordinate system in its appendix La Géométrie (published in Leiden).
- France places a few missionaries in the Ivory Coast, a country it will rule more than 200 years later.
- Scottish army officer Robert Monro publishes Monro, His Expedition With the Worthy Scots Regiment Called Mac-Keys in London, the first military history in English.
- Elizabeth Poole becomes the first female founder of a town (Taunton, Massachusetts) in the Americas.
- Richard Norwood's book The Seaman's Practice is published for the first time.

== Births ==
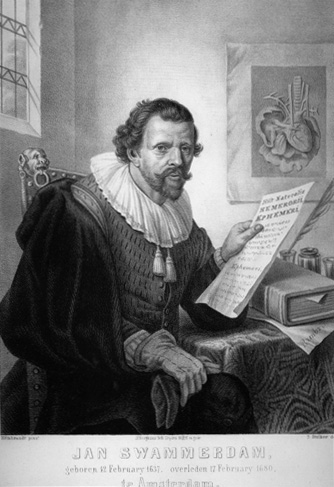
Jan Swammerdam

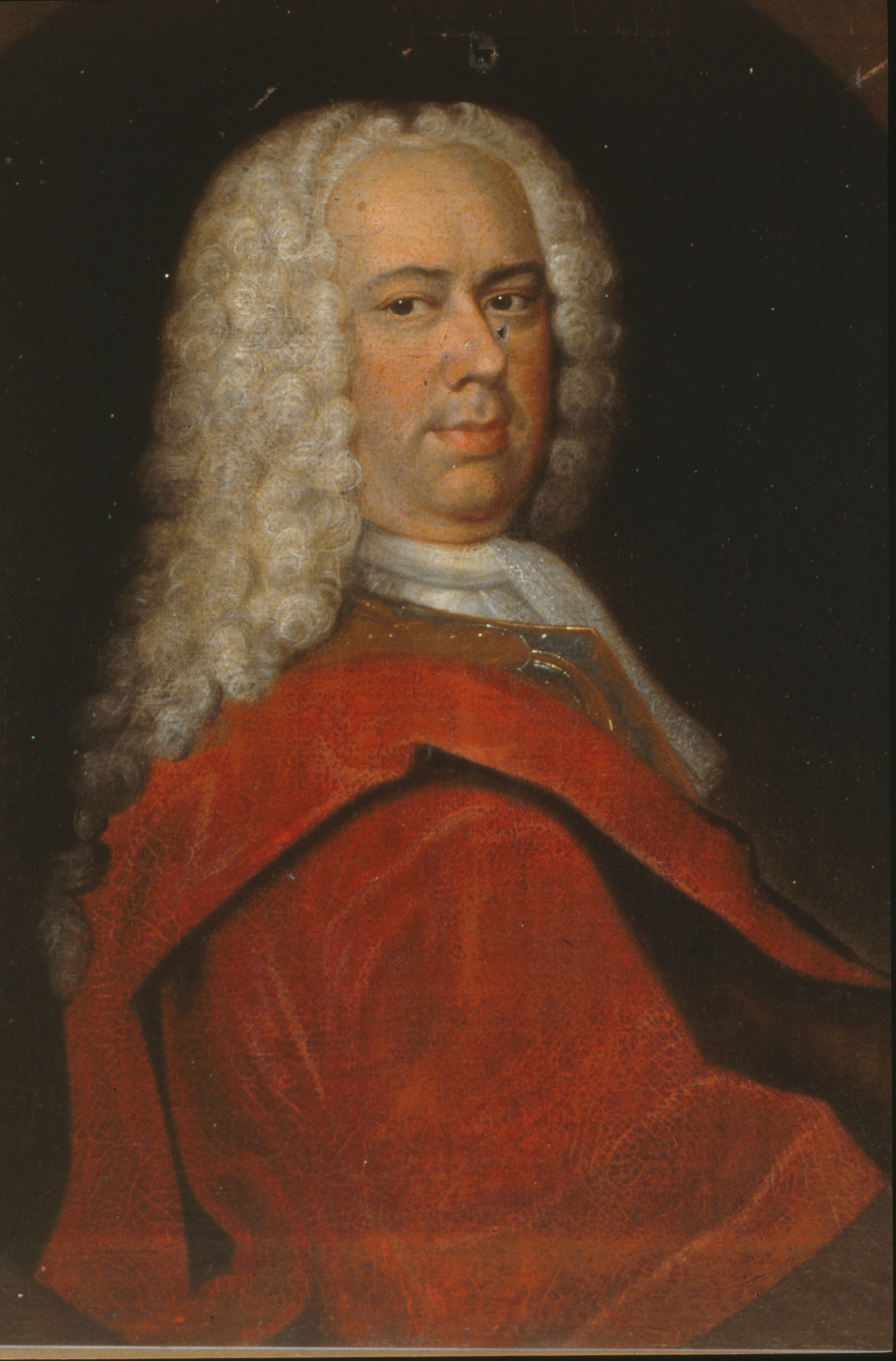
Johan Vibe

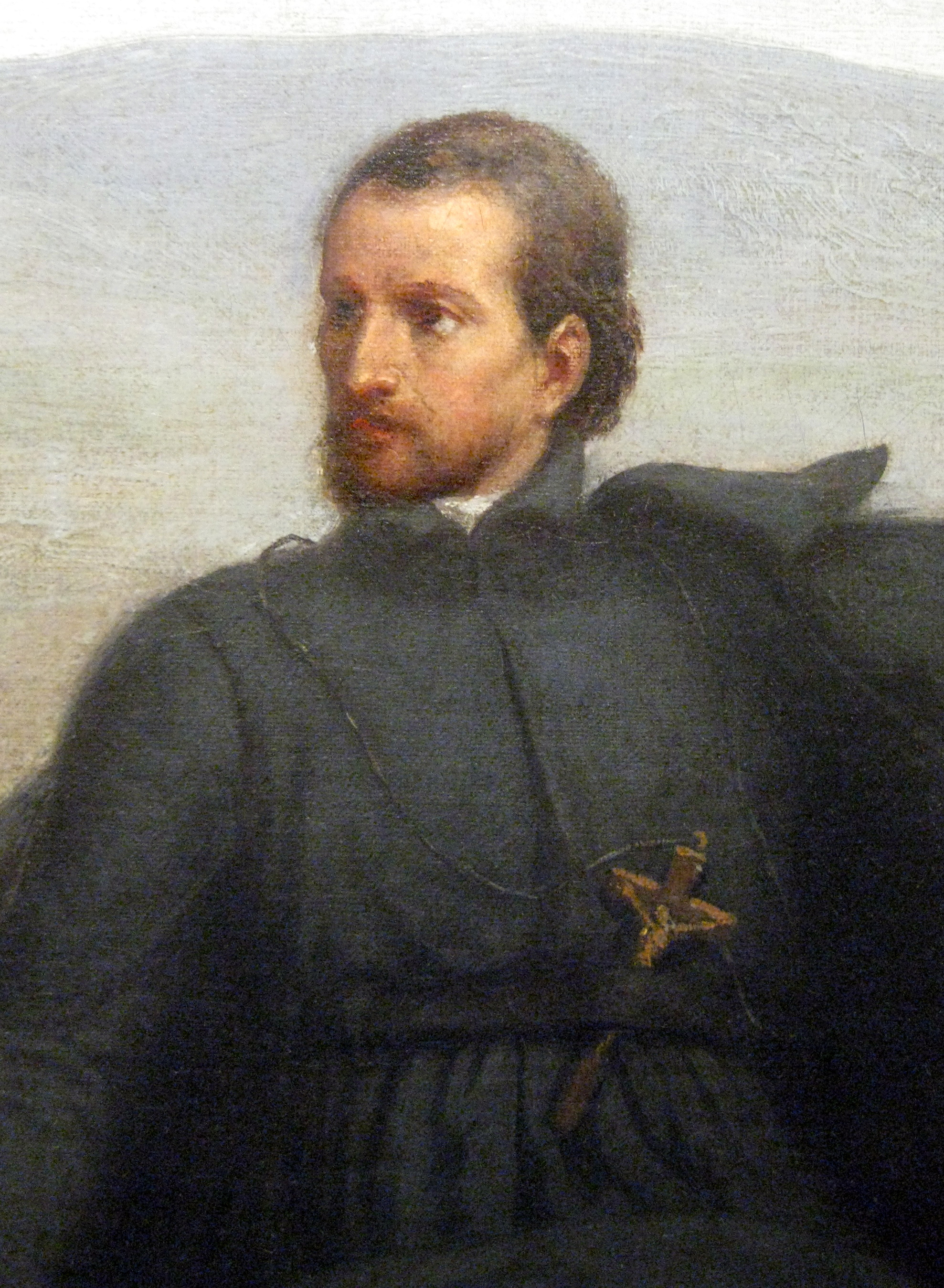
Jacques Marquette

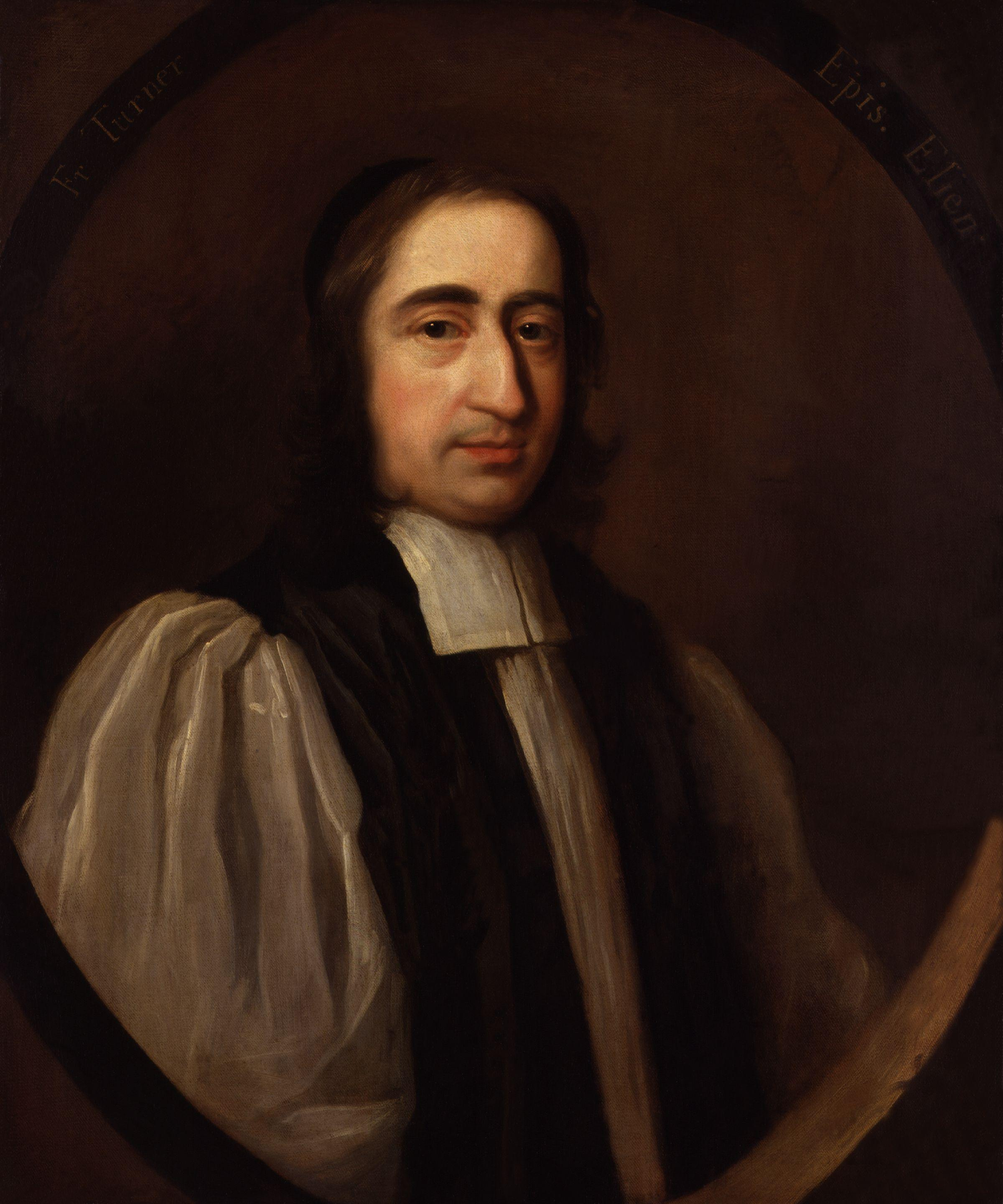
Francis Turner

=== January–March ===
- January 14 – Mattia de Rossi, Italian painter (d. 1695)
- January 18 – Manuel Fernández de Santa Cruz, Spanish religious writer, Catholic prelate and bishop (d. 1699)
- February 10
  - Countess Henriette Catherine of Nassau, daughter of Frederick Henry (d. 1708)
  - William Paget, 6th Baron Paget, English peer and ambassador (d. 1713)
- February 11 – Friedrich Nicolaus Bruhns, German organist and composer (d. 1718)
- February 12 – Jan Swammerdam, Dutch biologist and microscopist (d. 1680)
- February 13 – Denis Granville, English priest (d. 1703)
- February 21 – William Beveridge, English Bishop of St. Asaph (d. 1708)
- March 1 – Thomas Watson, Bishop of St. David's (d. 1717)
- March 2 – Sir Stephen Lennard, 2nd Baronet, English politician (d. 1709)
- March 5 – Jan van der Heyden, Dutch Baroque-era painter (d. 1712)
- March 14 – Fitz-John Winthrop, Governor of the Connecticut Colony (d. 1707)
- March 17 – Anne of England, daughter of King Charles I (d. 1640)
- March 30 – Samuel Pitiscus, Dutch classical scholar (d. 1727)

=== April–June ===
- April 6 – Sir William Whitmore, 2nd Baronet, English politician and baronet (d. 1699)
- April 16
  - Jean-Jacques Clérion, French sculptor who worked mainly for King Louis XIV (d. 1714)
  - Johan Vibe, Norwegian noble (d. 1710)
- April 19 – Mateo Cerezo, Spanish artist (d. 1666)
- May 13 – Giacinto Cestoni, Italian naturalist (d. 1718)
- May 22 – John Kyrle, British philanthropist (d. 1724)
- May 31 – Louis Laneau, French bishop active in the kingdom of Siam (d. 1696)
- June 1 – Jacques Marquette, French Jesuit missionary and explorer (d. 1675)
- June 11 – Tamura Muneyoshi, Japanese daimyō of the Iwanuma Domain (d. 1678)
- June 21 – Asano Tsunaakira, Lord of Hiroshima Domain (d. 1673)
- June 22
  - Takatsukasa Fusasuke, Japanese court noble of the early Edo period (d. 1700)
  - Christian II, Count Palatine of Zweibrücken-Birkenfeld (d. 1717)
  - Joseph Werner, Swiss painter (d. 1710)
- June 25 – Christophe Veyrier, French sculptor (d. 1689)

=== July–September ===
- July 24 – Nathaniel Fairfax, English divine and physician (d. 1690)
- August 16 – Countess Emilie Juliane of Barby-Mühlingen, German noblewoman and hymn author (d. 1706)
- August 19 – Roemer Vlacq, Dutch naval commander (d. 1703)
- August 20 – Cornelis van Aerssen van Sommelsdijck, first Dutch governor of Suriname (d. 1688)
- August 23 – Francis Turner, British bishop (d. 1700)
- August 27 – Charles Calvert, 3rd Baron Baltimore, Colonial governor of Maryland (d. 1715)
- September 1 – Nicolas Catinat, French military commander and Marshal of France under Louis XIV (d. 1712)
- September 15 – James Brodie, Scottish politician (d. 1708)
- September 16 – Elisha Cooke, Sr., Massachusetts colonial politician and judge (d. 1715)
- September 26 – Sébastien Leclerc, French painter (d. 1714)

=== October–December ===
- October 3 – George Gordon, 1st Earl of Aberdeen, Lord Chancellor of Scotland (d. 1720)
- October 13 – Paul Fugger von Kirchberg und Weißenhorn, German politician (d. 1701)
- October 22 – Francis North, 1st Baron Guilford (d. 1685)
- October 24 – Lorenzo Magalotti, Italian philosopher (d. 1712)
- October 27 – Al-Mahdi Muhammad, Yemeni imam (d. 1718)
- November 4 – Juan Francisco de la Cerda, 8th Duke of Medinaceli, Spanish politician (d. 1691)
- November 23 – Paul Mezger, Austrian Benedictine theologian and academic (d. 1702)
- November 25 – Armand de Gramont, Comte de Guiche, French nobleman (d. 1673)
- November 30 – Louis-Sébastien Le Nain de Tillemont, French ecclesiastical historian (d. 1698)
- December 6 – Edmund Andros, English colonial administrator in North America (d. 1714)
- December 7
  - William Neile, English mathematician and founder member of the Royal Society (d. 1670)
  - Bernardo Pasquini, Italian composer of operas (d. 1710)
- December 10 – Jacques-René de Brisay de Denonville, Marquis de Denonville (d. 1710)
- December 19 – Sir William Leman, 2nd Baronet, English politician (d. 1701)
- December 24 – Pierre Jurieu, French Protestant leader (d. 1713)
- December 27 – Petar Kanavelić, Venetian writer (d. 1719)
- December 30 – William Cave, English divine (d. 1713)

== Deaths ==
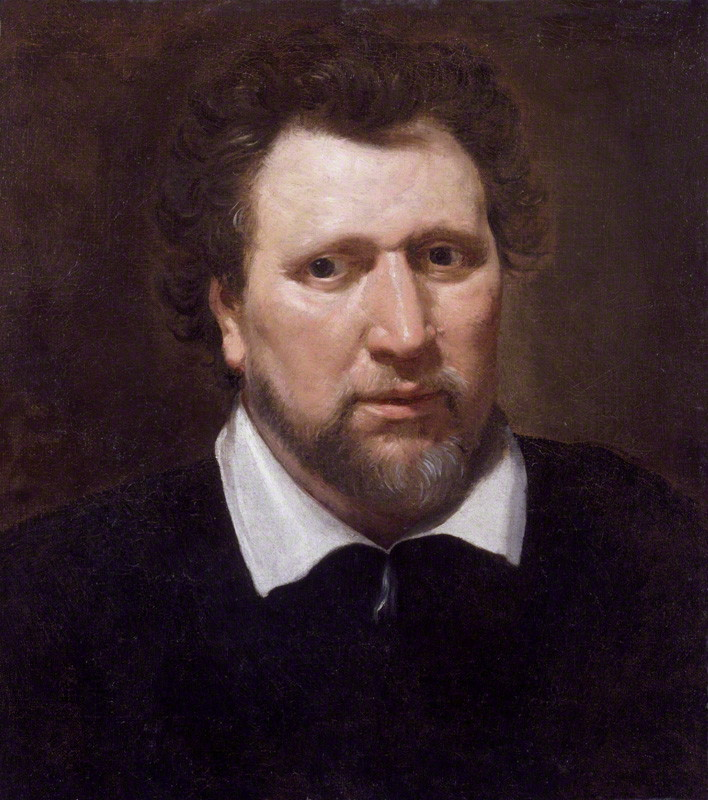
Ben Jonson

- January 23 – Alice Spencer, Countess of Derby, Baroness Ellesmere and Viscountess Brackley (b. 1559)
- February 15 – Ferdinand II, Holy Roman Emperor (b. 1578)
- March 10 – Bogislaw XIV, Duke of Pomerania (b. 1580)
- March 12
  - Cornelius a Lapide, Flemish Jesuit exegete (b. 1567)
  - Anders Arrebo, Danish writer (b. 1587)
- March 19 – Péter Pázmány, Hungarian cardinal and statesman (b. 1570)
- April 3 – Joseph Yuspa Nördlinger Hahn, German rabbi
- April 4 – Fernando Afán de Ribera, duke of Alcalá de los Gazules, Spanish diplomat (b. 1583)
- April 30 – Niwa Nagashige, Japanese warlord (b. 1571)
- May 2 – Chamaraja Wodeyar VI, King of Mysore (b. 1603)
- May 5 – William Petre, 2nd Baron Petre, English peer and MP (b. 1575)
- May 19 – Isaac Beeckman, Dutch scientist and philosopher (b. 1588)
- May 29 – Jiří Třanovský, Czech priest and musician (b. 1592)
- June 6 – Pieter Huyssens, Flemish architect (b. 1577)
- June 24 – Nicolas-Claude Fabri de Peiresc, French astronomer (b. 1580)
- July 1 – Christopher von Dohna, German politician and scholar (b. 1583)
- July 21 – Daniel Sennert, German physician, chemist (b. 1572)
- July 28 – Johann Christoph von Westerstetten, German bishop (b. 1563)
- August 6 – Ben Jonson, English writer (b. 1572)
- August 17 – Johann Gerhard, German Lutheran leader (b. 1582)
- August 27 – Princess Catherine Beatrice of Savoy, daughter of the Duke of Savoy (b. 1636)
- September 8 – Robert Fludd, English mystic (b. 1574)
- September 9 – Louise de Bourbon, French noble (b. 1603)
- September 14
  - Theodoor Rombouts, Flemish painter (b. 1597)
  - Pierre Vernier, French mathematician (b. 1580)
- September 21 – William V, Landgrave of Hesse-Kassel (b. 1602)
- September 22 – Charles Gonzaga, Duke of Mantua and Montferrat (b. 1580)
- September 27 – Lorenzo Ruiz, Filipino saint (b. c.1600)
- October 5 – Daniel Cramer, German theologian (b. 1568)
- October 7 – Victor Amadeus I, Duke of Savoy (b. 1587)
- October 16 – Johann Rudolf Stadler, Swiss clock-maker (b. 1605)
- October 21 – Laurens Reael, Dutch admiral (b. 1583)
- October 27 – Robert Caesar, English politician (b. 1602)
- November 26
  - Andries de Witt, Grand Pensionary of Holland (b. 1573)
  - Humilis of Bisignano, Italian Franciscan friar and saint (b. 1582)
- December 4 – Nicholas Ferrar, English trader (b. 1592)
- December 19 – Christina of Lorraine, Tuscan regent (b. 1565)
- December 24 – Juan López de Agurto de la Mata, Spanish Catholic prelate (b. 1572)
- December 27 – Vincenzo Giustiniani, Italian banker (b. 1564)
- December 31 – Christian, Count of Waldeck-Wildungen (1588–1637) (b. 1585)
