= Canon Sinuum =

Canon Sinuum may refer to:

- Canon Sinuum (Bürgi), a sine table by Jost Bürgi.
- Canon Sinuum (Pitiscus), the table by Bartholomaeus Pitiscus
- Canon Sinuum (Vlacq), the table by Adriaan Vlacq
