= H. Bricmore =

Scottish scholastic philosopher

H. Bricmore, Brichemore, or Brydgemoore (14th century), surnamed Sophista, was a Scottish scholastic philosopher. Bricmore is stated by John Leland to have lived at Oxford, and to have written commentaries on some of the works of Aristotle. He is probably the same person as Brichemon, of whom Leland gives a very similar description. The only account of his life comes from Thomas Dempster who states that Bricmore was one of a number of Scots sent to the University of Oxford by decree of the council of Vienne, and that he was a canon of Holy Rood, Edinburgh. Dempster adds, implausibly, that he died in England in 1382.

== Works ==
- Some Notulæ secundum H. Brygemoore appear in a manuscript of Corpus Christi College, Oxford in connection with extracts from Walter Burley and others of the major schoolmen.
