= Johannes Rosinus =

Johannes Rosinus (Johann Roszfeld) (c. 1550 – 1626) was the German author of a work on Roman Antiquity called Antiquitatum romanarum corpus absolutissimum, which first appeared at Basel in 1585.

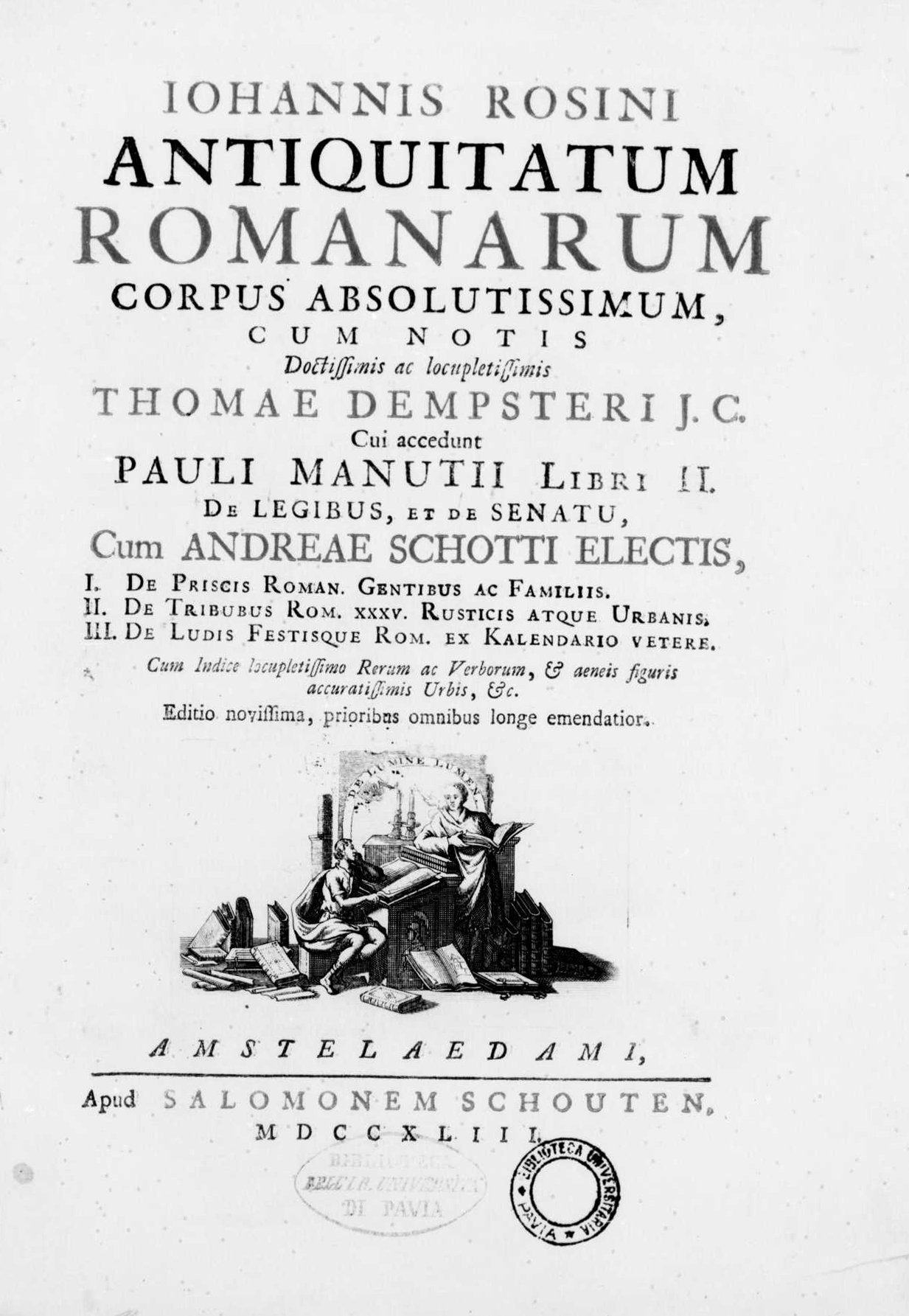
Antiquitatum romanarum corpus absolutissimus, 1743 edition

He studied at Jena, and became sub-rector of a school at Regensburg. He also served as minister of a Lutheran church at Wickerstadt in Weimar. He later preached at the cathedral church in Naumburg, Saxony.

Rosinus' work went through a series of editions with subsequent editors including Thomas Dempster, Paolo Manuzio, Andreas Schott, and Samuel Pitiscus.

Dempster's dedication of his edition of Rosinus' Antiquitatum romanarum corpus absolutissimum to King James I won him an invitation to the English court.

== Works ==
- Antiquitatum romanarum corpus absolutissimus (in Latin). Basilea. 1585.
  - Rossfeld, Johann (1663). Antiquitatum romanarum corpus absolutissimus (in Latin).
  - Antiquitatum romanarum corpus absolutissimus (in Latin). Amsterdam: Salomon Schouten. 1743.
