= Thomas Dempster =

Scottish scholar and historian (1579–1625)

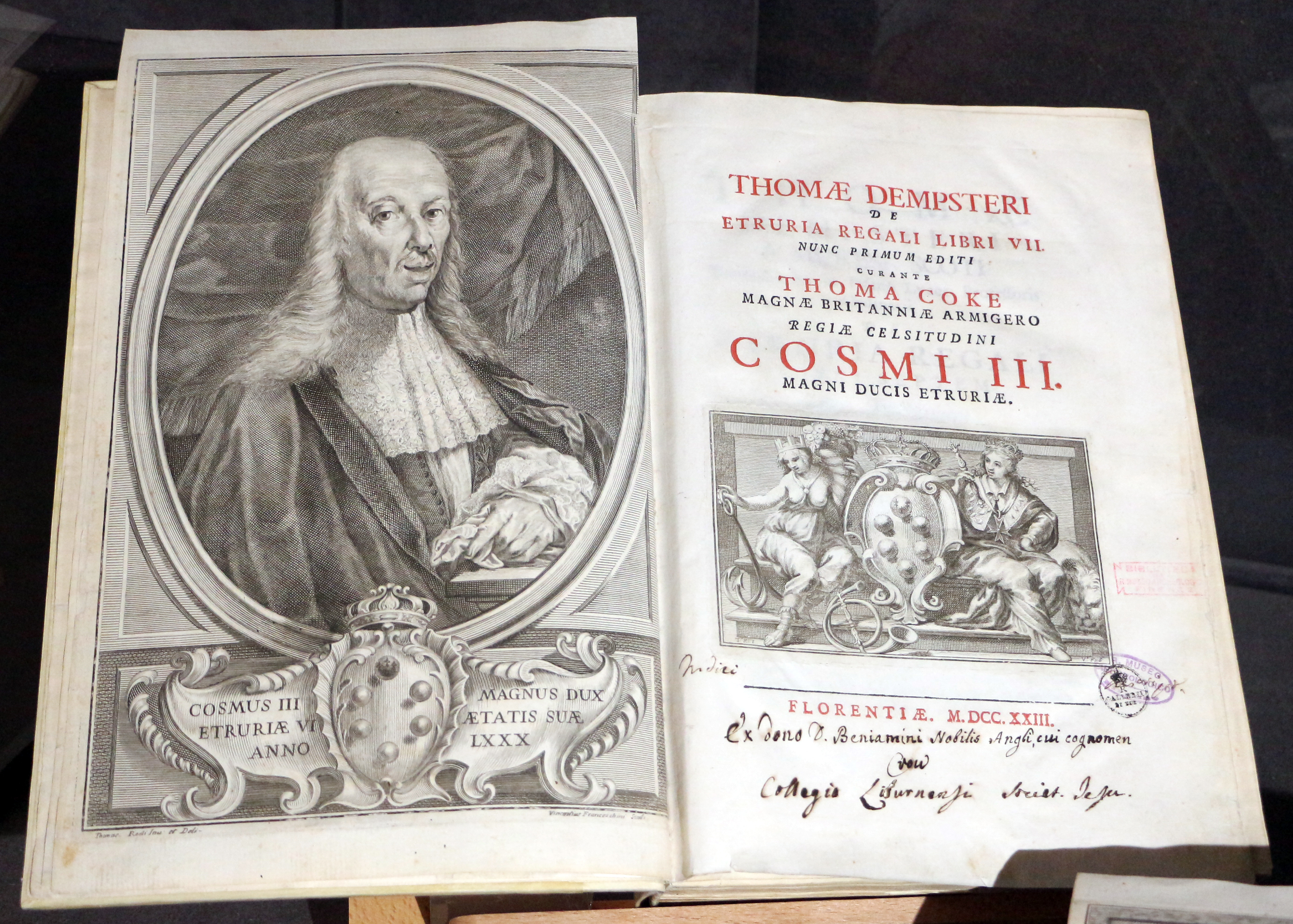
De Etruria Regali, Florence 1720–1726 (written 1616–1619)

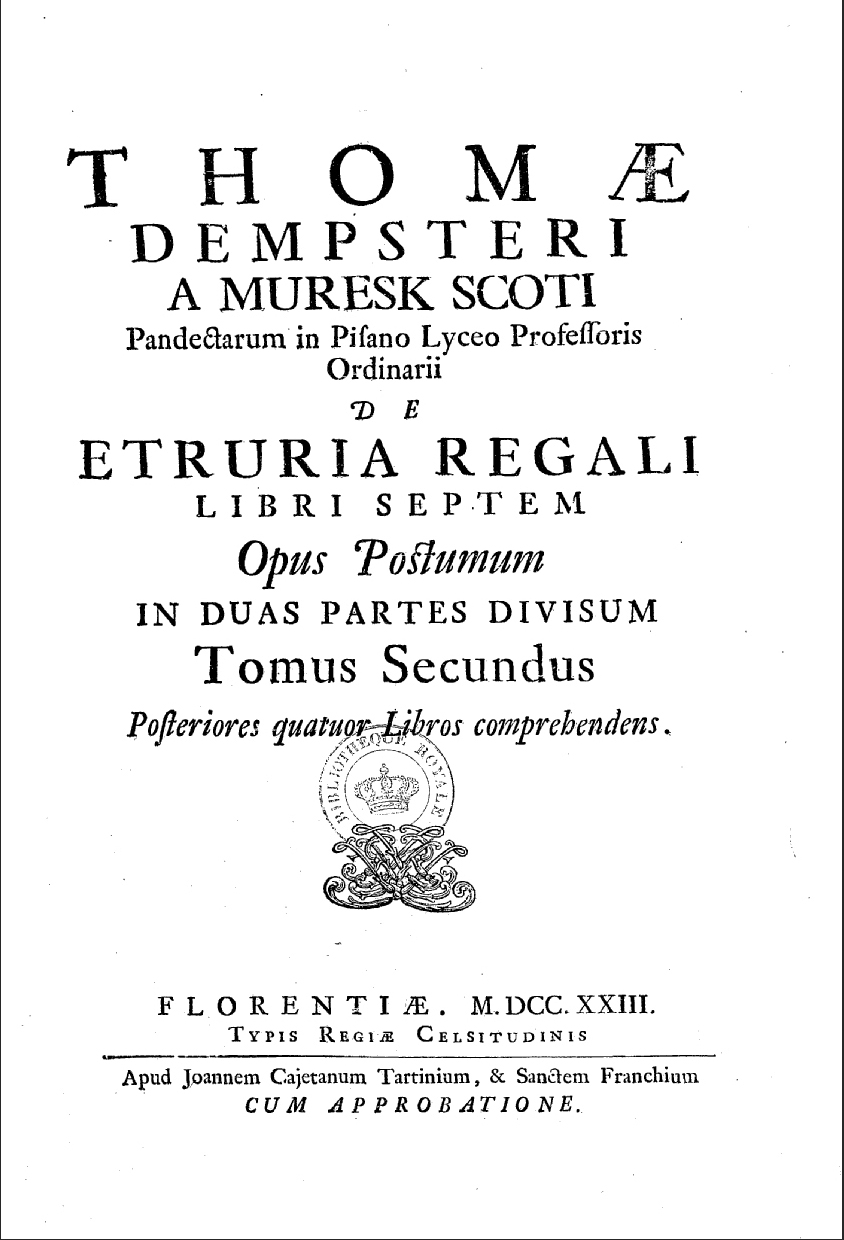
De Etruria Regali Libri VII, Tome 2, 1723

Thomas Dempster (23 August 1579 – 6 September 1625) was a Scottish scholar and historian. Born into the aristocracy in Aberdeenshire, which comprises regions of both the Scottish Highlands and the Scottish Lowlands, he was sent abroad as a youth for his education. The Dempsters were Catholic in an increasingly Protestant country and had a reputation for being quarrelsome. Thomas' brother James, outlawed for an attack on his father, spent some years as a pirate in the northern islands, escaped by volunteering for military service in the Low Countries and was drawn and quartered there for insubordination. Thomas' father lost the family fortune in clan feuding and was beheaded for forgery.

For these and political and religious reasons in these often violent Elizabethan times Thomas was unable to come home except for visits. Of uncommon and impressive height and intellectual ability he became an itinerant professor in France and Italy, driven from place to place by a series of colourful personal incidents in which he fought duels or opposed officers of the law. He eventually found refuge and patronage under Grand Duke Cosimo II of Tuscany, who commissioned a work on the Etruscans. Three years later Thomas handed the duke a magnum opus, the manuscript of De Etruria Regali Libri Septem, "Seven Books about Royal Etruria", in the Latin language, the first detailed study of every aspect of Etruscan civilisation, considered a brilliant work. In 1723 Thomas Coke finally undertook to publish an enhanced edition of it. The original manuscript remains in Coke's library at Holkham.

== Biography ==
=== Early life ===
==== Family background and education ====
Thomas Dempster, according to his own account, was born at Cliftbog, Aberdeenshire near Turriff). to Thomas Dempster, Laird of Muiresk or Muresk, and Jean Leslie, a daughter of Willam Lesley, 9th Baron of Balquhain, Auchterless and Killesmont, and sheriff (until 1586) of Banff and Buchan. A 1592 charter from James VI confirms the lands owned by Thomas Dempter and his wife Jean Leslie and designates his heirs Robert (2nd son), Thomas (3rd son), and George, who are called "legitimate offspring", with John, Archibald and Charles Dempster. Girls could not inherit, so they are not listed. The oldest son, James, is not included from this record.

By birth Jean Leslie was connected to the Clan Forbes, her mother, Janet Forbes, was a daughter of John Forbes, 6th Lord Forbes. Her marriage seems to have taken place a few years before Clan Leslie joined with Clan Gordon in their feud against Clan Forbes. The Leslies were supporters of Mary, Queen of Scots, a Catholic, a history which may or may not be connected with later accusations that Thomas was an intelligencer for James I.

Andrew Ogston was appointed as Thomas Dempster's tutor. Dempster wrote that he learned the alphabet from Ogston in a single hour at age three. He may have been older; in any case, Andrew recognised talent in his pupil. He sent him to Grammar School in Aberdeen, and in 1588 at the age of ten (or 14) Thomas left home to enter Pembroke Hall, Cambridge.

==== Family feud ====
Meanwhile, his father Thomas Dempster of Muresk had taken a mistress, Isabella, from Clan Gordon, which must have been a bitter blow to Jean Leslie. Apparently Isabella charmed not only Thomas but his eldest son James Dempster, who married her. Thomas Dempster disinherited him. James Dempster and a band of Gordons waylaid Thomas and his party on the road between his estates. Thomas was shot several times in the legs and suffered a sword blow to the head, as a result of which James became an outlaw, surviving by banditry in Shetland and Orkney. The younger Thomas' uncle, John Dempster, an Edinburgh lawyer, insisted he be educated abroad to remove him from the environment.

The elder Dempster continued to make decisions that were the ruin of the family. Clan feuding was an expensive activity from which every clan suffered. The elder Thomas had already lost much of his estate to pay for feuds with Clan Currer and Clan Grant. He decided now to sell the estate at Muiresk to the Earl of Erroll to prevent his eldest son from ever inheriting it. The earl took advantage of some fine print in the law, now obscure, to evade payment.

=== Education abroad ===
==== Scots College of Paris ====
Thomas and tutor started out for Paris. He was ten in the most precocious dating scheme, possibly as old as 14 in others. They had no sooner reached the continent when they were robbed of all their possessions and probably beaten as well, as Ogston died not long after. Their assailants remain unknown except that they were French soldiers. However, a good Samaritan stepped forward: Walter Brus, an officer in the French army, who was of Scottish descent, and judging from the name, perhaps not of the humblest birth. Walter sent him on to Paris, where other officers of Scottish descent in the French army took up a subscription to place him at the University of Paris.

According to the structure of the university at the time, Thomas would have entered the Scots College there; the fact that the subscription was of Scottish officers indicates that that is the most likely possibility. If true, it shows that Brus' motivations were not entirely altruistic. The Scots Colleges abroad were being used as training and staging areas for Scottish priests intended to enter Scotland in the wake of the invading army and play the most significant role in its reconversion. The failure of the invasion left them in place (without much work to do other than intelligence and conspiracy).

==== Diversions to Belgium and Rome ====
At the University of Paris Thomas became deathly ill with "the plague" and on recovering was sent by someone in charge of his destiny to the University of Louvain in the Southern Netherlands (now Belgium), to study under Justus Lipsius. Thomas himself gives that as a reason, but otherwise does not have a clear explanation for the change, stating only that Belgium was a "safe refuge". Instead he was diverted from this plan by William Crichton, Jesuit, then Superior of the Scots College, Douai, which is a good indication that forces unknown to young Thomas were at work in his life. He did not matriculate at Louvain.

The University of Douai was founded by Philip II of Spain as part of his military build-up against England and was at first identical to the English College there. This college was a refuge and rallying point for English Catholics fleeing the re-establishment of Protestantism after the death of Mary I and the accession of Elizabeth I. Mary had won for herself the popular title "Bloody Mary" for her methods in attempting to reimpose Catholicism on England. Philip II, who had been married to Mary 1554–1558, used the seminarians from Douai openly as agents. They were often in England illegally to establish contacts and maintain a bridgehead, so to speak, for reconversion.

The mastermind in the strategy to reconquer Great Britain for Catholicism and Spain was that of Philip II. He was supported in this effort by a long series of short-term popes (some very short-term), such as Innocent IX (1591), Gregory XIV (1590–1591), etc., who basically followed his strategy. Clement VIII (1592–1605), Cardinal Aldobrandini since 1585, changed the policy and stood against Philip, after his military defeat by the English.

In the latter part of the 16th century, deeming that the reconversion structure needed strengthening, the popes established a number of Scots Colleges, typically through the Jesuits. One of these was the Scots College at Douai, founded by its first Superior, Father William Crighton (P. Gulielmus Creighton), who held the office 1581–1597, according to the records of the college.

Apparently Crighton had been asked by "the pope": perhaps Pope Sixtus V (1585–1590) to provide Scottish students for seminary study at Rome. The Scots College at Rome did not receive its foundation bull from Clement VIII until 1600, but the request specifically for Scotsmen evidences an early interest in that direction. How Crighton got Dempster's name remains as unknown as why he was deported from Paris, but Thomas was one of four selected and did not enroll at Louvain, but journeyed straight to Rome. He mentions that Cardinal Aldobrandini was raising an army there and calls him also Clement VIII, perhaps in anticipation of later events. Dempster says that he was in a seminarium Romanum with "the choicest nobility of Italy", which he would not have been if the Scots College had existed then.

==== Scots College of Douai ====
The Roman plan came to nothing when, as Dempster says, "the lethal disease recurred." Acting on medical advice the church authorities returned him to Belgium for a change of climate. After an arduous and dangerous journey north of the Alps he connected at Tournai with James Cheyne, a member of his network of Scottish patrons. Securing funding from "the king of Spain", who must have been Philip II, and "Archduke Albert", Cheyne sent him to the Scottish College, Douai, from which, after a few years, he graduated.

The name of Thomas Demster appears as Item Number 64 in the Register of Alumni for the college, applying to the year 1593, with a very brief entry next to his name, "etiam seminarii alumnus." Apparently the college accepted both seminarians and seculars, and this notification identified Thomas as a seminarian. If the 1579 birthdate is true, Thomas would have been 14. Of his stay there he had little to say, only that he took first prize in poetry and second in philosophy.

He showed such ability that, when still in his teens, he became lecturer on the Humanities at the University of Douai. After a short stay, he returned to Paris, to take his degree of doctor of Canon law.

=== Itinerant professor ===
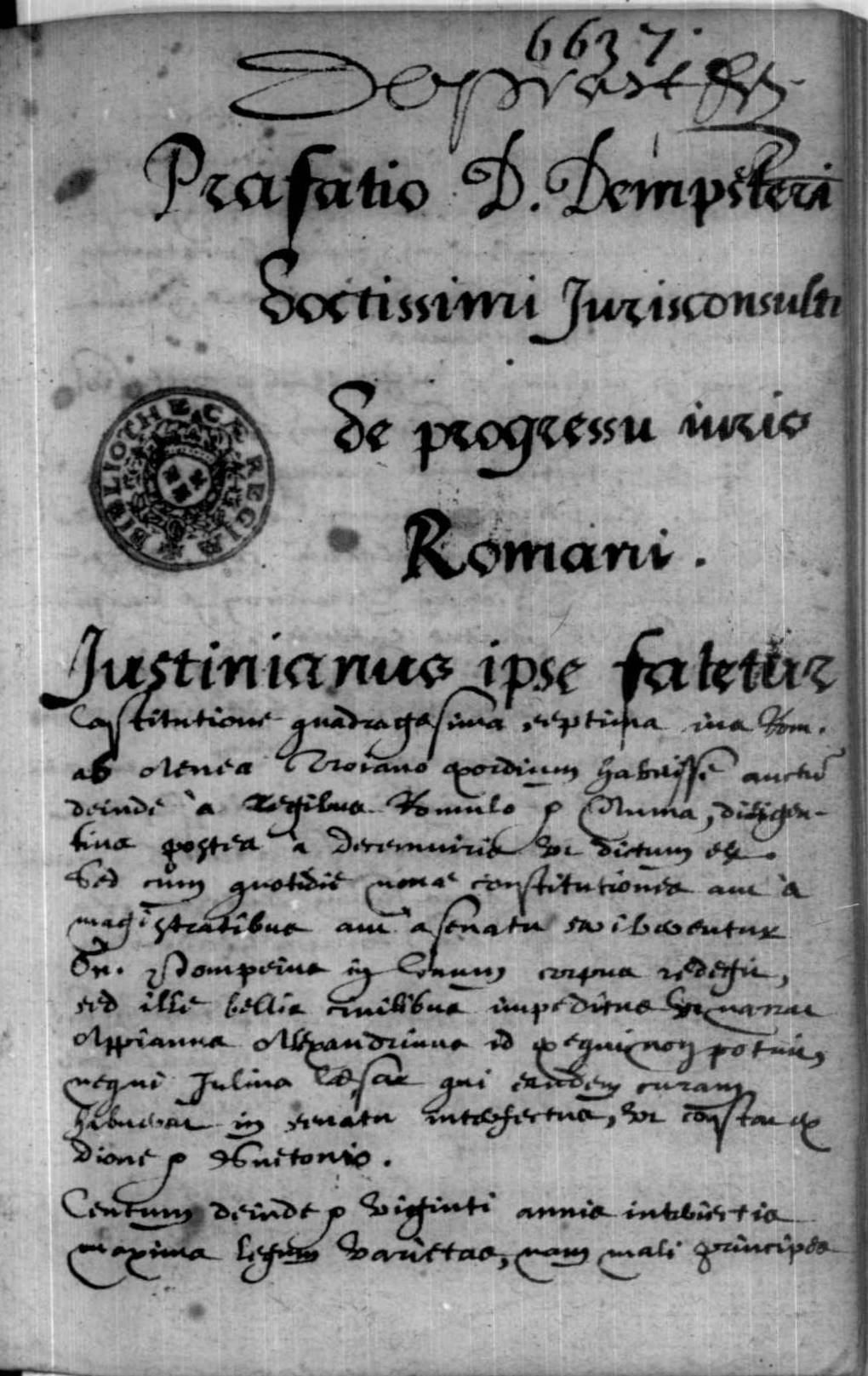
Preface to the Lectura Institutionum, manuscript, 16th century. Paris, Bibliothèque Nationale de France.

Dempster's first position as a doctor was a regent, or full professor, of the Collège de Navarre, at age 17. He soon left Paris for Toulouse, which in turn he was forced to leave by the hostility of the city authorities, aroused by his violent assertion of university rights. He was than elected professor of eloquence at the academy of Nîmes. A murderous attack upon him by one of the defeated candidates and his supporters was followed by a libel case, which, though he ultimately won, forced him to leave the town.

A short stay in Spain, as tutor to the son of Marshal de Saint Luc, was terminated by another quarrel; and Dempster returned to Scotland in 1608 with the intention of claiming his father's estates. Finding his relatives unsympathetic, and falling into heated controversy with the Presbyterian clergy, he returned to Paris in 1609, where he remained for seven years, becoming professor in several colleges.

In the end, his temporary connection with the Collège de Beauvais was ended by a fight, in which he defeated officers of the king's guard, forcing him once again to change his place of residence. The story is told in Latin by Gian Vittorio Rossi, a contemporary. He begins with a characterisation of Dempster that has been much repeated: "But, I don't know by what pact, those most mild-mannered sisters (the Muses) ... have embraced Thomas Dempster, a Scot, a man made for war and contention ... he allowed almost no day to go by empty of strife ... but that he should fight another by sword, or, if he had no sword, with fists ...." In the story, Dempster whips a student on the bare back for dueling, but the student, unable to bear the insult, brings in three relatives who happen to belong to the custodes corporis Regis, the king's own bodyguard. In response Dempster arms the other students, surrounds the guardsmen and puts them in chains in the bell tower. In the resulting inquiry, "such a storm arose" that Thomas departed for England. The story says distinctly that England was a "safe refuge", meaning between the lines that Catholic prosecutors could not extradite him or threaten him with agents.

The story goes on to say that in England he met a woman (Susanna Valeria) "so abundant, so favored by Venus that nothing else would do but that he have her to wife." At this point the story skips over a small matter, intentionally or not, that might well explain Thomas' future apparent inability to settle in one place, even as a renowned and successful scholar. The dedication of his edition of Rosinus' Antiquitatum romanarum corpus absolutissimum to King James I, a Protestant (the king of the King James Bible), even though he, Dempster, was a Catholic, had won him an invitation to the English court; and in 1615 he went to London. There James I appointed him historiographer royal.

=== "Escape" to Italy ===
He was not there long. Even though England was totally safe for him, and he had already been preferred by a king who admired him, and had married an English girl, complaining that he was not accepted by the Protestants and could not find advancement because of them he set sail for Rome with his wife. Pope Paul V immediately drew what may have been the correct conclusion and threw him into prison as a spy. However, the good pope changed his mind shortly, perhaps still hoping to reconvert the son of Mary, Queen of Scots, and decided accept the matter graciously, placing Thomas in Italy. He used his influence with Cosimo II de' Medici, Grand Duke of Tuscany, to get Thomas appointed to the professorship of the Pandects at Pisa. The Grand Duke commissioned him also to write a definitive work on the Etruscans.

In 1619 his daughter died shortly after birth, the only child he was to have. In 1620 after the execution of his father he began to call himself the Baron of Muiresk, which in Scotland was considered an illegitimate claim. His brother James, though disinherited from the estate, still had a claim to the title, which was considered to end with his death, as he had no heir. In any case Thomas was not the second son but the third. The second (Robert) had no heirs, either, which did not strengthen the case of the Dempsters. They were forced to accept the end of their clan; that is, there were no further charters to Dempsters from the king, nor was anyone entitled to be called Baron Dempster or use the coat of arms. Modern Dempsters, of course, may do as they please in accordance with the laws of the countries in which they reside.

At Pisa Thomas worked very hard on his commission, sometimes 14 hours per day. The strain was too much for his wife, perhaps depressed also by her loss. She ran off with an Englishman, but later returned. The issue of adultery came up again. Violent accusations followed, indignantly repudiated; a diplomatic correspondence ensued, and a demand was made, and supported by the grand duke, for an apology, which the professor refused to make, preferring to lose his chair. He set out once more for Scotland, but was intercepted by the Florentine cardinal Luigi Capponi, who persuaded him to remain at Bologna as professor of Humanity. This was the most distinguished post in the most famous of continental universities, and Dempster was at the height of his fame. Though his Roman Antiquities and Scotia ilustrior had been placed on the Index pending correction, Pope Urban VIII made him a knight and gave him a pension.

It was in Bologna that Thomas made friends with Matteo Pellegrini, who was to complete his autobiography posthumously and described "Dempsterus" as a man "outstanding in body and mind: his height was above the average height of the common man: his hair was nearly black and the colour of his skin not far from that: his head was huge and the carriage of his body completely regal; his strength and ferocity were as outstanding as that of a soldier ...."

=== End ===
Thomas was not to enjoy his honours long. His wife ran off again, this time with a student. He pursued them as far as Vicenza. Becoming ill with a fever he returned to Bologna, where he died on 6 September at age 46 (or 50).

His associates in the Accademia della Notte gave him a splendid funeral, attended by the papal legate, and one of the academicians, Ovidio Montalbani, delivered an elaborate funeral eulogy, which was published in the course of the following year.

Thomas Dempster is buried in Bologna.

== Publications ==
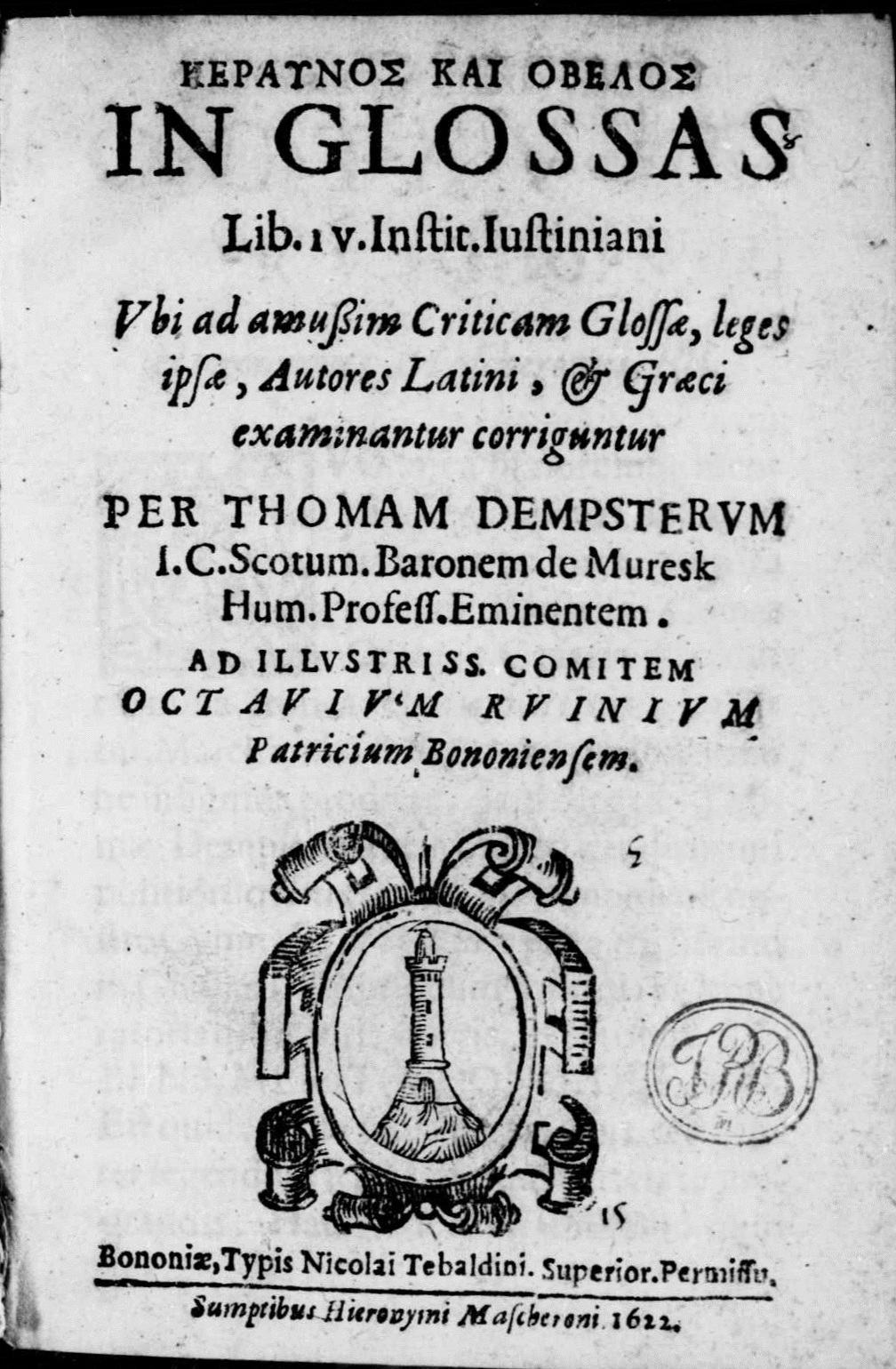
Keraunos kai obelos in glossas librorum quatuor Institutionum, 1622

Dempster was equally at home in philology, criticism, law, biography, and history. He was a master of the Latin language and wrote in Latin, as was still the academic custom of the times. His works are:

- An edition of Rosinus' Antiquitatum Romanarum corpus absolutissimum "The Most Complete Body of Roman Antiquities" (Paris, 1613). Dedicated to James I. This is the work that came to the attention of the king.
- Panegyricus Jacobo M. (Magnae) Britanniae Regi, "Panegyric to James, King of Great Britain (London, 1616)"
- Poetic contributions In Obitum Aldinae Catellae: lachrymae poeticae, "On the Death of the Puppy Aldina: Poetic tears" (Paris, 1622).
- Keraunos kai obelos in glossas librorum quatuor Institutionum (in Latin). Bologna: Nicolò Tebaldini. 1622.
- An edition of Benedetto Accolti's De bello a Christianis contra barbaros, "Of the Christian War against the Barbarians" (1623).
- Historia ecclesiastica gentis Scotorum, "Ecclesiastical History of the Scottish Nation" (Bologna, 1627). Morér asserts that this "is one of the most discredited works ever written in the field of Scottish history." The 1911 Encyclopædia Britannica says: "In this he tries to prove that Bernard (Sapiens), Alcuin, Saint Boniface and Johannes Scotus Eriugena were all Scots, and even Boadicea becomes a Scottish author." The last chapter was intended as his autobiography, which Matteo Pellegrini, a friend at Bologna, completed posthumously. Much of what it says about him; for example, that his mother had 29 children and that he himself was one of triplets, is counted as prevarication. The low quality of this work after so much brilliance remains unexplained.
- Some of his Latin verse is printed in the first volume (pp. 306–354) of Delitiae poetarum Scotorum (Amsterdam, 1637).

== The rescue of De Etruria Regali ==
Dempster's major work was rescued from oblivion by Thomas Coke (1697–1759) later Earl of Leicester. Aged 15, he started on the Grand Tour, and in Etruria befriended the Grand Duke Cosimo II. Through him he discovered the existence of Dempster's manuscript, which he purchased from its then owner, Antonio Maria Salvini. This he published apparently at his own expense; however, the publication was not exactly of the original. Filippo Buonarroti of Florence emended the text and added a critical apparatus. The duke had his own engravers enhance Dempster's illustrations with new ones drawn from artefacts in various collections. In all the work came to contain about 100 copperplate engravings. It came out in two volumes, folio, at Florence, 1723–1724, under the comprehensive title:

"Thomae Dempsteri a Muresk Scoti Pandectarum in Pisano Lyceo Professoris Ordinarii de Etruria Regali libri septem, opus posthumum, in duas partes divisum, nunc primum editi curante Tho. Coke"

A Latin dedication to Cosimo III, dated 1725, London, was added in 1726 by Coke. A folio supplement was published by Passeri, 1767. The publication of the book sparked the first public wave of interest in the Etruscans throughout academic Italy.

== See also ==
- H. Bricmore – Scottish scholastic philosopher

== Bibliography ==
- Dempster, Thomas (1829). Historia Ecclesiastica Gentis Scotorum sive De Scriptoribus Scotis Editio Altera Tom. II. Edinburgh: Andreas Balfour cum Sociis. Available Google Books.
- Forbes-Leith, William (1906). Records of the Scots Colleges at Douai, Rome, Madrid, Valladolid and Ratisbon. Aberdeen: New Spalding Club. Viewable Google Books.
- Burton, John Hill (1881). The Scot Abroad. Edinburgh and London: W. Blackwood & Sons.
- Leighton, Robert, Castelino, Celine. "Thomas Dempster and ancient Etruria. A Review of the autobiography and De Etruria Regali, Papers of the British School at Rome, LVIII (1990) 337-352". Papers of the British School at Rome.
- Morér, Ulrike (2000). "An Early Scottish National Biography". In Mapstone, Sally; et al. (eds.). A Palace in the Wild: Essays on Vernacular Culture and Humanism in Late Mediaeval and Renaissance Scotland. Leuven: Peeters. pp. 249 following. ISBN 90-429-0899-8.
- Robertson, Joseph (1857). Illustrations of the Topography and Antiquities of the Shires of Aberdeen and Banff, the Third Volume. The Spalding Club.
- Rowland, Ingrid Drake (2004). The Scarith of Scornello: a Tale of Renaissance Forgery. Chicago: U. of Chicago Press. ISBN 0-226-73036-0.
- Stirling, Anna Maria Diana Wilhelmina Pickering (1908). Coke of Norfolk and his Friends. London, New York: John Lane, the Bodley Head. Available Google Books.
- Wellard, James (1973). The Search for the Etruscans. New York: Saturday Review Press. ISBN 0-8415-0231-5.

Attribution
