= Canon Sinuum (Pitiscus) =

1613 book by Bartholomaeus Pitiscus

The Canon Sinuum is the main part of Bartholomaeus Pitiscus' Thesaurus Mathematicus sive Canon Sinuum ad radium 1.00000.00000.00000 published as a folio in 1613 (misprinted on two of the titles 1513, by omission of a C in the Roman numeral MDCXIII) in Frankfurt. It is a table of sines, originally computed by Rheticus, with the sines given every 10 seconds to 15 places, with first, second, and third differences. This table spans 270 pages.

In addition, the Canon Sinuum gives the sines to 15 places for every second of the first and last degrees of the quadrant, as well as several other tables.
