= Queen of Genoa =

The title of Queen of Genoa was given to the Blessed Virgin Mary on March 25, 1637. Although the independent Genoa had always been a republic, the Madonna (common Italian name for the Blessed Virgin) was the highest rank in the Republic's hierarchy. The elevation did not occur only for piety but also because of political reasons. In fact, during the 12th century, republics were considered less important than kingdoms in diplomatic affairs. At the end of World War II, during the three days that occurred between the German and Allied occupations, writing appeared on the city walls proclaiming "Genova città di Maria Santissima" (Genoa, Holy Mary's City) or "Maria Santissima Regina di Genova" (Holy Mary, Queen of Genoa).
