= Samuel Pitiscus =

Dutch classical scholar (1637–1727)

Samuel Pitiscus (30 March 1637 – 1 February 1727) is a Dutch historian and classicist. He was a nephew of Bartholomaeus Pitiscus.

== Biography ==
Samuel Pitiscus was born in Zutphen as the son of a vicar. His parents were German immigrants coming from Palts. At age sixteen he studied theology in Deventer and transferred to Groningen in 1655 to continue his studies. Three years later he was appointed as headmaster of the Latin school in his home town. He held this post until 1685 when he accepted a similar position at the Latin school in Utrecht. In 1690 he was asked by a printer to deliver a commentary on the work of Suetonius and the book was published later that year. In 1713 he revised Rosinus' work on Roman antiquities, publishing his Lexicon antiquitatum romanarum. He also published a Dutch-Latin dictionary together with Arnoldus Henricus Westerhovius. Pitiscus retired in 1717

He died in Utrecht.

== Works ==
- Gaiji Suetonii Tranquilli Opera (1690)
- Lexicon antiquitatum Romanarum (1713)
- Lexicon Latino-Belgicum novum (1729, posthumously)
